= Corballis =

Corballis is a surname. Notable people with the surname include:

- Dick Corballis (1946–2016), New Zealand academic
- Michael Corballis (1936–2021), New Zealand psychologist and author
- Paul Corballis, New Zealand cognitive neuroscientist
