= Gopnik (surname) =

Gopnik is a surname. Notable people with the surname include:

- Myrna Gopnik (born 1935), Canadian linguist
- Adam Gopnik (born 1956), American writer, son of Myrna
- Alison Gopnik (born 1955), psychology professor, daughter of Myrna
- Blake Gopnik (born 1963), American art critic, son of Myrna

== See also ==
- Gopner
