= Laterality (journal) =

- Discipline: Neuropsychology
- Language: English
- Edited by: Markus Hausmann, Lesley Rogers, René Westerhausen

Publication details
- History: 1996–present
- Publisher: Routledge
- Frequency: Bimonthly
- Impact factor: 2.167 (2021)

Standard abbreviations
- ISO 4: Laterality

Indexing
- ISSN: 1357-650X (print); 1464-0678 (web)
- LCCN: 2002238342
- OCLC no.: 1004529026

Links
- Journal homepage; Online access; Online archive

Laterality: Asymmetries of Body, Brain and Cognition is a bimonthly peer-reviewed academic journal covering the study of laterality and related behavioral and neurological factors, in human and non-human species. It was established in 1996, with Michael Corballis (University of Auckland), Chris McManus (University College London), and Phil Bryden (University of Waterloo) as founding editors-in-chief. Michael Peters (University of Guelph) served as editor after Bryden's death in 1996. Mike Nicholls (Flinders University) and Giorgio Vallortigara (University of Trento) replaced Corballis and Peters in 2007 after McManus retired and continued as editors-in-chief until 2018. The current editors-in-chief are Markus Hausman (Durham University), Lesley Rogers (University of New England, Australia), and René Westerhausen (former University of Oslo).
