= KE family =

British family with members with a speech disorder caused by mutations in FOXP2

The KE family is a medical name designated for a British family, about half of whom exhibit a severe speech disorder called developmental verbal dyspraxia. It is the first family with speech disorder to be investigated using genetic analyses, by which the speech impairment is discovered to be due to genetic mutation, and from which the gene FOXP2, often dubbed the "language gene", was discovered. Their condition is also the first human speech and language disorder known to exhibit strict Mendelian inheritance.

Brought to medical attention from their school children in the late 1980s, the case of KE family was taken up at the UCL Institute of Child Health in London in 1990. Initial report suggested that the family was affected by a genetic disorder. Canadian linguist Myrna Gopnik suggested that the disorder was characterized primarily by grammatical deficiency, supporting the controversial notion of a "grammar gene". Geneticists at the University of Oxford determined that the condition was indeed genetic, with complex physical and physiological effects, and in 1998, they identified the actual gene, eventually named FOXP2. Contrary to the grammar gene notion, FOXP2 does not control any specific grammar or language output. This discovery directly led to a broader knowledge on human evolution as the gene is directly implicated with the origin of language.

Two family members, a boy and a girl, were featured in the National Geographic documentary film Human Ape.

== Background and identity ==
The individual identities of the KE family are kept confidential. The family children attended Elizabeth Augur's special educational needs unit at the Lionel Primary School in Brentford, West London. Towards the end of the 1980s, seven children of the family attended there. Augur began to learn that the family had a speech disorder for three generations. Of the 30 members, half of them had severe disability, some are affected mildly, and few are unaffected. Their faces show rigidity at the lower half, and most cannot complete pronouncing a word. Many of them have severe stuttering and with limited vocabulary. In particular, they have difficulty with consonants, and omit them, such as "boon" for "spoon", "able" for "table", and "bu" for "blue". Linguistic deficiency is also noted in written language both in reading and writing. They are characterized by lower nonverbal IQ.

=== Ethnicity ===
When the first study on KE family was published in 1990, the exact identity of the family was withheld and simply indicated as living in West London. The first genetic study reported in 1995 revealed that they were 30 members of four generations, with the designation "KE family." In 2009, American psychologist Elena L. Grigorenko of Yale University wrote a review paper on the genetics of developmental disorders in which she specifically described a case of speech disorder in a "three-generation pedigree of Pakistani origin from the United Kingdom (referred to as KE)." When a team of researchers from Germany, led by Arndt Wilcke of the Leipzig University, reported in 2011 the effects of FOXP2 mutation in the brain, they mentioned the family as "a large Pakistani family with severe speech and language disorder."

The British-Pakistani description for the family became widely used. However, British geneticist and neuroscientist Simon E. Fisher at the Max Planck Institute for Psycholinguistics pointed out the error in Wilcke's paper to which the German team published a corrigendum that KE family were not of Pakistani descent, but "a large English Caucasian family."

== Research investigations ==
Augur convinced the family to undergo medical examinations and approached geneticist Michael Baraitser at the Institute of Child Health. With colleagues Marcus Pembrey and Jane Hurst at the Hospital for Sick Children (Great Ormond Street Hospital), they started taking blood samples for analyses in 1987. Their first report in 1990 shows that 16 family members were affected by severe abnormality, characterised by difficulty to speak effectively, understand complex sentences, unable to learn sign language, and that the condition was genetically inherited (autosomal dominant). Their conclusion runs:

Of the 16 affected children, none had significant feeding difficulties as infants and there were few neonatal problems. Hearing and intelligence of all affected members were within the normal range. The speech problem in this family has been classified as developmental verbal dyspraxia.

Upon the news, BBC was preparing a documentary of the case in the scientific serial Antenna. By this time, a Canadian linguist from McGill University, Myrna Gopnik, was visiting her son in Oxford, and delivered an invited lecture at the university, where she noticed the flyer for the BBC programme. She contacted the medical geneticists, interviewed KE family members, and returned to Montreal, Quebec. She was convinced that the genetic defect was largely centred on grammatical ability, and wrote letters to Nature in 1990. Her reports promulgated a notion of "grammar gene" and a controversial concept of grammar-specific disorder.

=== Discovery of FOXP2 gene ===
Neuroscientist and language expert at the Institute of Child Health Faraneh Vargha-Khadem began to investigate teaming up with University of Oxford and University of Reading linguists. In 1995 they found, contrary to Gopnik's hypothesis, from comparison of 13 affected and 8 control individuals, that the genetic disorder was a complex impairment of not only linguistic ability, but also intellectual and anatomical features, thereby disproving the "grammar gene" notion. Using positron emission tomography (PET) and magnetic resonance imaging (MRI), they found that some brain regions were underactive (compared to baseline levels) in the KE family members and that some were overactive, when compared to people without the condition. The underactive regions included motor neurons that control face and mouth regions. The areas that were overactive includes Broca's area, the speech centre. With Oxford geneticists Kate Watkins, Simon Fisher and Anthony Monaco, they identified the exact location of the gene on the long arm of chromosome 7 (7q31) in 1998. The chromosomal region (locus) was named SPCH1 (for speech-and-language-disorder-1), and it contains 70 genes. Using the known gene location of speech disorder from a boy, designated CS, of an unrelated family, they discovered in 2001 that the main gene responsible for speech impairment in both KE family and CS was FOXP2. Mutations in the genes result in speech and language problems.

== See also ==
- Apraxia of speech
- Developmental coordination disorder
- Evolutionary linguistics
