= Kate Watkins =

Experimental psychologist

- Born: Kathryn Emma Watkins
- Education: University of Cambridge (BA); University College London (MSc, PhD)
- Scientific career
- Fields: Speech; Language; Development disorders Sensorimotor interactions
- Workplaces: UCL Great Ormond Street Institute of Child Health; University of Oxford; Montreal Neurological Institute and Hospital
- Thesis: Neuropsychological and neuroimaging investigations of an inherited disorder of speech and language (1999)
- Doctoral advisor: Faraneh Vargha-Khadem
- Website: www.psy.ox.ac.uk/team/kate-watkins

Kathryn Emma Watkins is a British experimental psychologist in the Wellcome Trust centre for integrative neuroimaging at the University of Oxford and a tutorial fellow at St Anne's College, Oxford. Her research investigates the brain processes that underlie speech, language and development.

== Early life and education ==
Watkins was educated at the University of Cambridge where she studied the Natural Sciences Tripos as a student of Christ's College, Cambridge. She completed postgraduate research and study in neuropsychology at the UCL Great Ormond Street Institute of Child Health. For her PhD in neuropsychology she used structural image analysis to study the KE family, who have a severe motor speech disorder and a mutation in the FOXP2 gene. She worked with Faraneh Vargha-Khadem and David Gadian.

== Career and research ==
Watkins was a postdoctoral researcher with Tomas Paus in the Montreal Neurological Institute and Hospital. Here she used Transcranial Magnetic Stimulation (TMS), a method of stimulating the brain, in combination with electromyography (EMG) recordings of the lip and positron emission tomography (PET) imaging to identify the role of the motor cortex in speech perception. She also worked alongside Brenda Milner.

Watkins was appointed to the University of Oxford Functional MRI of the Brain (FMRIB) centre in 2003. She began to lecture experimental psychology at St Anne's College, Oxford in 2006. Watkins established the University of Oxford speech and brain research group, which uses neuroimaging and neurostimulation to monitor the sensorimotor interactions required for speech. Watkins uses cognitive neuroscience to investigate speech and language development. She is particularly interested in people who have stuttering, developmental verbal dyspraxia and aphasia. She has demonstrated that there are small differences in the brain activity of people who do and don't stutter, with more activity in the right hemisphere.

She completed a randomized controlled trial that demonstrated that transcranial direct-current stimulation (tDCS) can be used to enhance fluency in people who stutter. tDCS involves passing a small current through the brain, and could be used in combination with speech training to make more permanent improvements to fluency. It increases the firing rate of neurons in brain regions that Watkins has identified as important in speech disorder. She combines magnetic resonance imaging (MRI) with Transcranial Magnetic Stimulation (TMS) to measure brain activity as well as the activity from the muscles responsible for producing speech.

=== Selected publications ===
Her publications include:

- Tract-based spatial statistics: Voxelwise analysis of multi-subject diffusion data
- Correspondence of the brain's functional architecture during activation and rest
- Differential Effects of Early Hippocampal Pathology on Episodic and Semantic Memory
- Seeing and hearing speech excites the motor system involved in speech production

Watkins serves as the editor-in-chief of the open access journal Neurobiology of Language.
