= BPS Barbara Wilson Lifetime Achievement Award =

The BPS Barbara Wilson Lifetime Achievement Award is the highest UK professional award for clinical neuropsychologists.

It was created by the British Psychological Society's Division of Neuropsychology (DoN) in 2010 and is normally awarded on an annual basis. The award is named in honour of Professor Barbara A. Wilson, OBE, Ph.D, CPsychol, ScD, FBPsS, FMedSci, AcSS. Professor Wilson is one of the world's most eminent clinical neuropsychologists in medical neurorehabilitation. Nominations are invited from DoN members and are considered by an independent awards panel.

The award is made for an outstanding contribution to neuropsychology in the UK. The contribution may be in relation to research, training or clinical service development, with a significant impact on the practice of clinical neuropsychology either nationally or internationally. The award is normally made to someone in the middle or later stage of their career as a clinical neuropsychologist. Winners are announced at the DoN Annual Conference.

== Winners ==
Year	Award Winner	Institutions (at the time of the award)
2010–11	Professor Michael Oddy	Brainkind and University of Swansea
2011–12	Professor Gus Baker	Walton Centre and University of Liverpool
2012–13	Professor Robin Morris	King's College Hospital and Institute of Psychiatry, Psychology and Neuroscience
2013–14	Professor Faraneh Vargha-Khadem	Great Ormond Street Hospital for Children NHS Foundation Trust and UCL Great Ormond Street Institute of Child Health
2014–15	Professor Tom McMillan	University of Glasgow
2015–16	Professor Rodger Wood	University of Swansea
2016–17	Professor Peter Rankin	Great Ormond Street Hospital for Children NHS Foundation Trust and UCL Great Ormond Street Institute of Child Health
2017–18	Professor Jonathan Evans	University of Glasgow
2018–19	Professor Huw Williams	University of Exeter
2019–20	Professor Julie Snowden	University of Manchester
2020–21	Professor Nadina Lincoln	University of Nottingham
2021–22	Professor Laura Goldstein	Institute of Psychiatry, Psychology and Neuroscience and South London & Maudsley NHS Trust
2024–25	Dr. Andy Tyerman	Buckinghamshire Healthcare NHS Trust

== See also ==
- List of psychology awards
