= Sonja Vernes =

Neuroscientist

Sonja Vernes FRSE
- Born: Sonja Catherine Vernes
- Other name: Bat Boffin
- Education: University of Oxford
- Scientific career
- Fields: Neurogenetics
- Workplaces: Donders Centre for Cognitive Neuroimaging; Wellcome Trust Centre for Human Genetics; Max Planck Institute for Psycholinguistics; University of St Andrews
- Thesis: Investigation of the role of FOXP transcription factors in neurodevelopment (2007)
- Doctoral advisor: Kay Davies; Simon Fisher
- Website: risweb.st-andrews.ac.uk/portal/en/persons/sonja-vernes(9bc1f00f-6cfd-4be2-8de0-4d90d99c1108).html

Sonja Catherine Vernes is a neuroscientist who is, as of 2022, the head of the Neurogenetics of Vocal Communication Research Group at the University of St Andrews. She holds a UK Research and Innovation (UKRI) future leaders fellowship. Her research investigates vocal communication between mammals. She was a laureate for the 2022 Blavatnik Awards for Young Scientists.

== Education ==
Vernes became interested in human speech and language during her doctoral research at the University of Oxford, where she studied the biological origins of speech and language disorders, supervised by Kay Davies and Simon Fisher. She showed that the FOXP2 team altered neurodevelopment in human and mouse models. Vernes also showed the relationship between CNTNAP2 and FOXP2, indicating that the pair can cause various language-related issues.

== Research and career ==
Vernes held a short Wellcome Trust fellowship before joining the F.C. Donders Centre for Cognitive Neuroimaging as a research fellow. She was awarded a Max Planck Society and Human Frontier Science Program grant to establish her own research group at the Max Planck Institute for Psycholinguistics. She made use of bats to study speech and language traits. Her research investigates vocal communications in mammals. Vernes was the first to make use of bats as a tractable mammalian model of vocal learning. She is particularly interested in the biological mechanisms that underpin human speech. She achieves this by studying how bats learn vocalisations, and the genetic pathways that contribute to language learning and recognition.

Vernes was awarded a European Research Council consolidator grant in 2020, for the BATSPEAK project. BATSPEAK looks to understand the genomic markers and neural mechanisms that underpin vocal learning. That year she relocated to the University of St Andrews, where she was awarded a UKRI Future Leaders Fellowship in the School of Biology. At St Andrews, she has pioneered omics-based approaches to identifying the genes associated with vocal learning in animal models. Vernes is founding co-director of the international research consortium Bat1K.

=== Awards and honours ===
- 2018 FENS-KAVLI Network of Excellence Scholar
- 2020 European Research Council (ERC) consolidator grant
- 2022 Blavatnik Awards for Young Scientists UK Finalist
- 2026 Fellowship of the Royal Society of Edinburgh

=== Selected publications ===
- A functional genetic link between distinct developmental language disorders
- Identification of FOXP2 truncation as a novel cause of developmental speech and language deficits
- Identification of the transcriptional targets of FOXP2, a gene linked to speech and language, in developing human brain
