= L. J. Rogers =

L. J. Rogers may refer to:

- Leonard James Rogers, British mathematician
- Lesley Joy Rogers, Australian neurobiologist

== See also ==
- Rogers (surname)
