= Vallortigara =

Vallortigara is a surname. Notable people with the surname include:

- Elena Vallortigara (born 1991), Italian high jumper
- Giorgio Vallortigara (born 1959), Italian neuroscientist
