= Kay Davies =

British geneticist and anatomist

Dame Kay Davies DBE FRS FMedSci
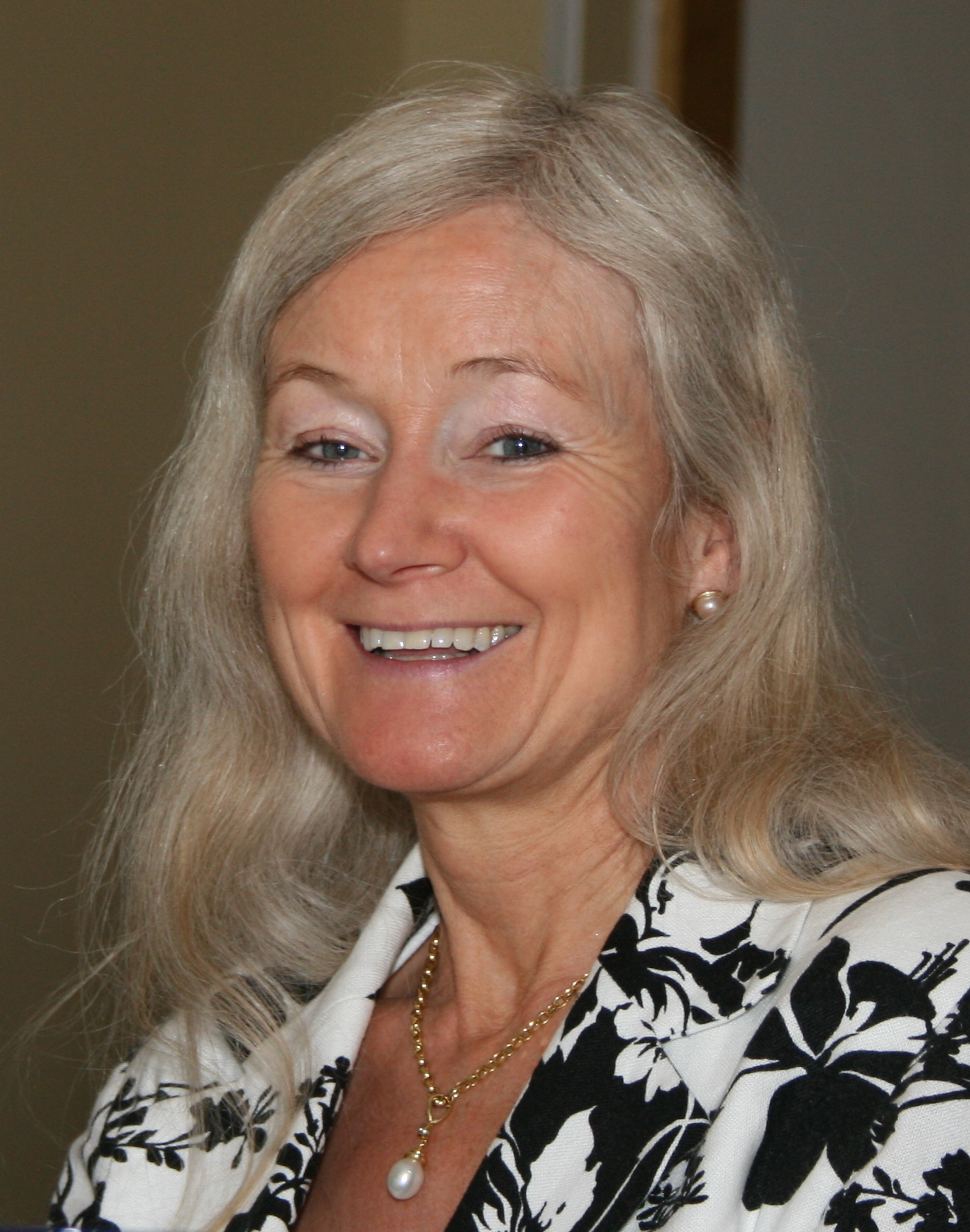
- Davies in 2008
- Born: Kay Elizabeth Partridge; 1 April 1951 (age 75); Stourbridge, Worcestershire, England
- Education: Somerville College, Oxford; Wolfson College, Oxford
- Known for: Duchenne muscular dystrophy research
- Spouse: Stephen G. Davies (m. 1973–2000)
- Awards: William Allan Award (2015); Joan Mott Prize Lecture (2010); Croonian Lecture (2018)
- Scientific career
- Fields: Genetics
- Workplaces: University of Oxford
- Thesis: Structure and function of Chromatin from the slime mould Physarum polycephalum (1976)
- Doctoral students: Irene Miguel-Aliaga; Sonja Vernes
- Website: www.dpag.ox.ac.uk/team/kay-davies

Dame Kay Elizabeth Davies (née Partridge; Born 1 April 1951) is a British geneticist. She is Dr Lee's Professor of Anatomy emeritus at the University of Oxford and a Honorary Fellow of Hertford College, Oxford. She was formerly director of the Medical Research Council (MRC) functional genetics unit at Oxford, a governor of the Wellcome Trust, Deputy chair of the Wellcome Trust (2013-18). She was a director of the Oxford Centre for Gene Function, and a patron and Senior Member of Oxford University Scientific Society. She was founder and editor of Human Molecular Genetics. Her research group has an international reputation for work on Duchenne muscular dystrophy (DMD). In the 1980s, she developed a test which allowed for the screening of foetuses whose mothers have a high risk of carrying DMD.

== Early life and education ==
Davies was born in Stourbridge, Worcestershire (now West Midlands). She was educated at the Gig Mill School, Stourbridge County High School for Girls, Somerville College, Oxford, and Wolfson College, Oxford. She was awarded a Doctor of Philosophy degree in 1976 for research on the structure and function of chromatin from the slime mould Physarum polycephalum.

== Career and research ==
Davies's research group has an international reputation for work on Duchenne muscular dystrophy (DMD). In the 1980s, she developed a test which allowed for the screening of foetuses whose mothers have a high risk of carrying DMD. DMD occurs when the dystrophin protein fails to express in muscle cells due to a mutation in the gene which codes for the protein. In 1989 Davies discovered that the utrophin protein has similar properties to dystrophin and has since shown in mouse models that up regulation of the former protein in muscle cells can compensate for the absence of latter.

Davies was director of the Medical Research Council (MRC) functional genetics unit, a governor of the Wellcome Trust and, with Frances Ashcroft and Peter Donnelly founded in 2000 the Oxford Centre for Gene Function. She was an Executive Editor of the journal Human Molecular Genetics. and stepped down in 2021.

In 2020, together with Richard P. Lifton, she co-chaired a commission report on the contentious subject of Hereditary Human Genome Editing, under the auspices of the National Academies of Sciences, Engineering, and Medicine and the UK Royal Society.

She has published more than 400 papers and won numerous awards for her work. She has been a Governor of the Wellcome Trust since 2008 and became Deputy chairman in 2013-18. She was the recipient of the Women in Science and Engineering (WISE) Lifetime Achievement Award in 2014.

Her former doctoral students include Irene Miguel-Aliaga and Sonja Vernes.

=== Controversy ===
In 2022, she was one of fifteen co-authors on a paper describing the use of a nasal spray, pHOXWELL, to reduce infection with SARS-CoV-2. The paper however came under scrutiny at the end of 2023, and was ultimately retracted in 2025 due to issues regarding the ethical approvals and subject recruitment of the study not adhering to the standards. The retraction came after an expression of concern was added to the paper in February 2025.

=== Award and honours ===
Davies was a founding Fellow of the Academy of Medical Sciences (FMedSci) in 1998, and was elected a Fellow of the Royal Society in 2003. Already a Commander of the Order of the British Empire (CBE), she was advanced to Dame Commander of the Order of the British Empire (DBE) in the 2008 New Year Honours. In 2009 she was awarded the Award for Excellence in Molecular Diagnostics by the Association for Molecular Pathology.

She is an Honorary Fellow, Somerville College, University of Oxford. She gave the inaugural Rose Lecture at Kingston University in 2012 and delivered the Harveian Oration at the Royal College of Physicians in 2013. In 2015, she was awarded the William Allan Award by the American Society of Human Genetics. She was appointed a Patron of The SMA Trust in September 2016.

Davies was awarded the Croonian Lecture by the Royal Society in 2018 for "her achievements in developing a prenatal test for Duchenne muscular dystrophy and for her work characterising the binding partners of the protein dystrophin".

== Personal life ==
Davies continued to work with her former husband, Stephen G. Davies, on scientific projects, even after their separation in 2000. Their son studied Biology and gained a doctorate at the University of Edinburgh between 2006 and 2015. She married Christopher Williams in 2019.
