= Barbara Wilson (psychologist) =

British psychologist

Barbara A. Wilson
- Occupation: Psychologist
- Known for: Founded the Oliver Zangwill Centre for Neuropsychological Rehabilitation

Prof. Barbara Ann Wilson OBE (born 1941) is the founder of the Oliver Zangwill Centre for Neuropsychological Rehabilitation in Ely, Cambridgeshire. She was appointed an OBE for her work in brain injury rehabilitation over 40 years for "medical rehabilitation". She was a clinical psychologist, and is now (2019) retired. She was shortlisted for a Lifetime Achievement Award in the NHS70 Parliamentary Awards in 2018 for her dedication to brain injury rehabilitation.

== Career ==
Wilson spent her early career working with children with developmental delay, and brain injury, which influenced her career direction. She says:

"I worked for two years with children who had severe developmental learning difficulties, and then I moved to Rivermead Rehabilitation Centre in Oxford. On my first day there I knew that brain injury rehabilitation was my field and I would stay there for the rest of my career."

She had a brain rehabilitation centre named after her in 2007. A centre in Quito Ecuador was named the "Centro de Rehabilitacion Neurologico Integral: Dra Barbara Wilson" and it was opened in honour of her work.

== Life ==
Barbara A. Wilson qualified as a clinical psychologist in 1977. She worked at the Rivermead Rehabilitation Centre in Oxford, then at Charing Cross Hospital and the Medical Research Council's Cognition and Brain Sciences Unit in Cambridge. She established the Oliver Zangwill Centre for Neuropsychological Rehabilitation at the Princess of Wales Hospital in Ely in 1996. She is the founder and editor of the journal Neuropsychological Rehabilitation. Wilson is a Fellow of the Academy of Medical Sciences, the Academy of Social Sciences and the British Psychological Society (BPS) and past president of the British Neuropsychological Society and the International Neuropsychological Society. The BPS Barbara Wilson Lifetime Achievement Award, the highest UK professional award for clinical neuropsychologists, is named after her. Wilson was appointed an OBE in the New Year's Honours List in 1998 for services to medical rehabilitation. She ran the London marathon, in 2008, in close to six hours and ran for a charity fund.

== Publications ==
Wilson has written and edited several books, chapters and papers including:

- The Assessment, Evaluation and Rehabilitation of Everyday Memory Problems: Selected Papers of Barbara A. Wilson (2013)
- Case Studies in Neuropsychological Rehabilitation (1999)
- Essentials of Neuropsychological Rehabilitation (Wilson and Betteridge 2019)
- Life After Brain Injury: Survivors' Stories (Wilson et al. 2013)
- Memory Rehabilitation: Integrating Theory and Practice (2009)
- Neuropsychological Rehabilitation: The International Handbook (Wilson et al., eds, 2017)
- Neuropsychological Rehabilitation: Theory, Models, Therapy and Outcome (Wilson et al. 2009)

== Awards ==
Wilson has published more than 200 peer-reviewed manuscripts, 26 books, as well as eight neuropsychological tests.

Her awards include:

- (1998) OBE for services to rehabilitation;
- Four lifetime achievement awards, one from the British Psychological Society, one from the International Neuropsychological Society, one from the National Academy of Neuropsychology and one from the Encephalitis Society;
- (2011) Ramon Y Cahal award, the International Neuropsychiatric Association;
- (2014) honorary degree from The University of Cordoba, Argentina;
- (2014) M.B. Shapiro award, The Division of Clinical Psychology (The British Psychological Society) for Distinguished Contributions to Clinical Psychology.
