= Mike Nicholls =

Australian experimental psychology researcher

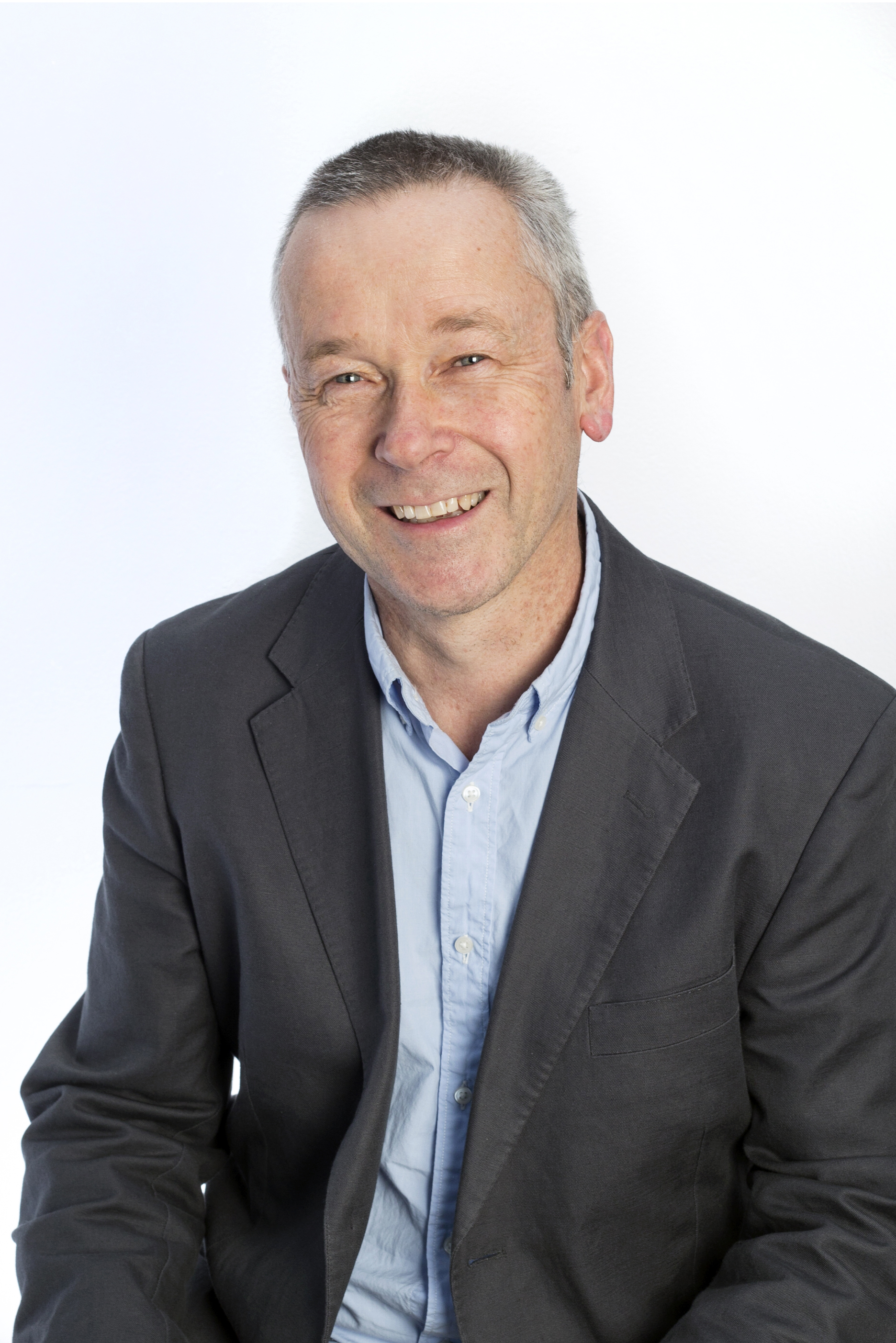
- Born: 1963 (age 62–63); Adelaide
- Education: Cambridge University
- Scientific career
- Fields: Experimental psychology Laterality; Attention
- Workplaces: Melbourne University; Flinders University
- Doctoral advisor: Janette Atkinson

Mike Nicholls is an Australian researcher in experimental psychology.

== Biography ==
In 1988 he graduated in psychology from the University of Adelaide before completing his doctorate in 1993 at Cambridge University with Janette Atkinson as a Cambridge Commonwealth Trust scholar. In 1994 he was appointed lecturer at University of Melbourne where he established the Laterality Laboratory. He was appointed Strategic Professor in Psychology at Flinders University in 2010, where he heads the Brain and Cognition Lab and is Dean of Research for the College of Education, Psychology and Social Work. He has made significant contributions to research in the fields of spatial attention and laterality, including the development of a new handedness questionnaire, the Flanders. He was an editor-in-chief of the journal Laterality from 2007-2018 and has been a member of the Australian College of Experts since 2019. In 2020, he was awarded the national award for Outstanding Academic Mentor by the Australian Psychological Society.

== Selected publications ==
=== Books ===
- McManus, C., Vallortigara, G., & Nicholls, M. E. (2010) The Right Hand and the Left Hand of History. United Kingdom: Taylor & Francis Group.

=== Journal articles ===
- Nicholls, M. E., Bradshaw, J. L., & Mattingley, J. B. (1999). Free-viewing perceptual asymmetries for the judgement of brightness, numerosity and size. Neuropsychologia, 37(3), 307-314, https://doi.org/10.1016/S0028-3932(98)00074-8.
- Nicholls, M. E., & Roberts, G. R. (2002). Can free-viewing perceptual asymmetries be explained by scanning, pre-motor or attentional biases?. Cortex, 38(2), 113-136, https://doi.org/10.1016/S0010-9452(08)70645-2
- Nicholls, M. E., Thomas, N. A., Loetscher, T., & Grimshaw, G. M. (2013). The Flinders Handedness survey (FLANDERS): a brief measure of skilled hand preference. Cortex, 49(10), 2914-2926, https://doi.org/10.1016/j.cortex.2013.02.002
- Nicholls, M. E., Clode, D., Wood, S. J., & Wood, A. G. (1999). Laterality of expression in portraiture: Putting your best cheek forward. Proceedings of the Royal Society of London. Series B: Biological Sciences, 266(1428), 1517-1522, https://doi.org/10.1098/rspb.1999.0809.
