= Sabine Landau =

German statistician

Sabine Landau is Professor of Biostatistics at the Institute of Psychiatry, King's College London. Landau was acting and then head of the Biostatistics Department in 2005–2009 and during 2008–2009 was the head of the Mental Health and Neurosciences Clinical Trials Unit.

Landau is a member of the UK Mental Health Research Network's Methodology Research Group and the Royal Statistical Society's General Applications (GAS) committee. She is a member of the King's Trials Partnership steering committee with the aim of to sharing and expanding clinical trials knowledge.

== Selected publications ==
- Frangou, Sophia; Donaldson, Stuart; Hadjulis, Michael; Landau, Sabine; Goldstein, Laura H. (2005). "The Maudsley Bipolar Disorder Project: Executive Dysfunction in Bipolar Disorder I and Its Clinical Correlates". Biological Psychiatry. 58 (11). Elsevier BV: 859–864. doi:10.1016/j.biopsych.2005.04.056. ISSN 0006-3223. PMID 16039620. S2CID 23048792.
- Landau, Sabine; Everitt, Brian S (2004), A handbook of statistical analyses using SPSS, Chapman & Hall/CRC, ISBN 978-1-58488-369-2
- Everitt, Brian; Landau, Sabine; Leese, Morven (2001), Cluster analysis, Oxford University Press, ISBN 978-0-340-76119-9
