= Dick Corballis =

New Zealand academic

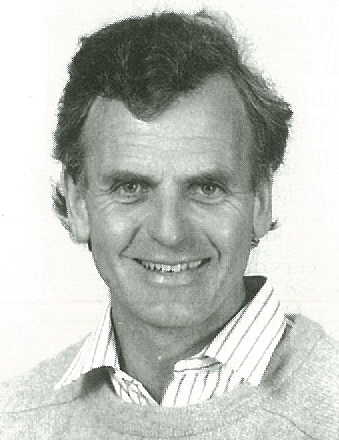
- Born: Richard Patrick Corballis; 24 March 1946
- Died: 20 July 2016 (aged 70); Wellington, New Zealand
- Education: University of Southampton
- Spouse: Helen Penelope Janet Dawson (m. 1969)
- Scientific career
- Fields: English literature
- Workplaces: University of Canterbury; Massey University
- Thesis: George Chapman's development as a comic dramatist (1972)

Richard Patrick Corballis (24 March 1946 – 20 July 2016) was a New Zealand academic who specialised in the study of Irish literature, and particularly the writings of James Joyce.

== Early life, family and education ==
Born on 24 March 1946, Corballis was the son of Alice Elizabeth Corballis (née Harris) and Philip Patrick Corballis, and the youngest brother of psychologist Michael Corballis. Educated at Wanganui Collegiate School, he went on to study at the University of Canterbury, graduating with a Master of Arts in 1967, and the University of Southampton, where he was awarded a PhD in 1972. His doctoral thesis was entitled George Chapman's development as a comic dramatist.

In 1969, Corballis married Penny Dawson, and the couple went on to have three children.

== Career ==
Corballis was on the faculty at the University of Canterbury for 19 years, before moving to Massey University, where he was appointed professor and head of department of English, and involved in the establishment of that institution's campus at Albany in Auckland. He served on the council of Massey University from 1993 to 1997, and in 1997 was appointed as the first head of the School of English and Media Studies at Massey. In 2001, Corballis was elected to the governing body of the International Association of University Professors of English.

Corballis' research focused on Irish literature and he was particularly interested in the works of James Joyce. However, he also published the works of other writers, including Witi Ihimaera and Tom Stoppard. In 2008, Corballis was writer in residence at the Michael King Writers Centre in Devonport, Auckland, where he conducted research for a biography of New Zealand playwright, Bruce Mason.

== Later life and death ==
Corballis retired from Massey University in 2011. He died in Wellington on 20 July 2016.
