= Myrna Gopnik =

Canadian psychologist and linguist

Myrna Lee Gopnik (born 1935 in Philadelphia, Pennsylvania) is a Canadian linguist. She is a professor emerita of linguistics at McGill University. She is known for her research on the KE family, an English family with several members affected by specific language impairment.

Gopnik is generally credited with an important early evaluation of the KE family, and with making this family known to the wider scientific community. Subsequent research by Anthony Monaco, Simon Fisher and colleagues at the University of Oxford identified a mutation in the FOXP2 gene as a cause of the KE family's disorder (see: A forkhead-domain gene is mutated in a severe speech and language disorder.

Gopnik is married to English professor Irwin Gopnik. They have six children together, including Alison, a developmental psychology professor at the University of California, Berkeley; Adam, a novelist and writer for The New Yorker; and Blake, an art critic.

== Publications ==
- Linguistic structures in scientific texts, 1968
- Semiotic approaches to theories, 1976
- The inheritance and innateness of grammars, 1997
