= SRPX2 =

Gene involved in glutamatergic synapse formation

Identifiers
- Aliases: SRPX2, BPP, CBPS, PMGX, RESDX, SRPUL, sushi repeat containing protein, X-linked 2, sushi repeat containing protein X-linked 2
- External IDs: OMIM: 300642; MGI: 1916042; GeneCards: SRPX2

Gene location (Human)
Chr.	X chromosome (human)
Band	Xq22.1	Start	100,644,195 bp
Band	Xq22.1	End	100,675,788 bp

Gene location (Mouse)
Chr.	X chromosome (mouse)
Band	X|X E3	Start	132,809,175 bp
Band	X|X E3	End	132,833,195 bp
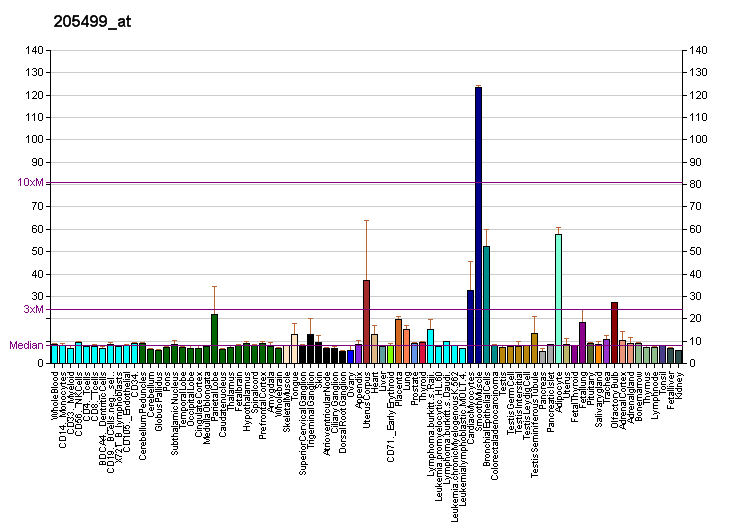
RNA expression pattern
Bgee	Human / Mouse (ortholog); Top expressed in: stromal cell of endometrium; Achilles tendon; cartilage tissue; sural nerve; tendon of biceps brachii; subcutaneous adipose tissue; right lung; left ovary; pericardium; right ovary / Top expressed in: calvaria; body of femur; stroma of bone marrow; lower jaw; interventricular septum; membranous bone; mandible; endothelial cell of lymphatic vessel; maxilla; embryo; More reference expression data
BioGPS	More reference expression data
Gene ontology
Molecular function	hepatocyte growth factor binding; signaling receptor binding; protein binding; identical protein binding; extracellular matrix structural constituent
Cellular component	extracellular region; cell junction; synapse; cell surface; cytoplasm; excitatory synapse; synaptic membrane; extracellular space; collagen-containing extracellular matrix
Biological process	regulation of phosphorylation; vocalization behavior; cell adhesion; angiogenesis; positive regulation of cell migration involved in sprouting angiogenesis; positive regulation of synapse assembly; cell motility; cell-cell adhesion
Sources:Amigo / QuickGO
Orthologs
Databases	NCBI: entry; OMA: entry
Species	Human	Mouse
Entrez	27286	68792
Ensembl	ENSG00000102359	ENSMUSG00000031253
UniProt	O60687	Q8R054
RefSeq (mRNA)	NM_014467	NM_001083895; NM_026838
RefSeq (protein)	NP_055282	NP_001077364; NP_081114
Location (UCSC)	Chr X: 100.64 – 100.68 Mb	Chr X: 132.81 – 132.83 Mb
PubMed search
- Wikidata
View/Edit Human	View/Edit Mouse

Sushi repeat-containing protein SRPX2 is a protein that in humans is encoded by the SRPX2 gene, on the X chromosome. It has roles in glutamatergic synapse formation in the cerebral cortex and is more highly expressed in childhood. Bioinformatics analysis suggests the SRPX2 protein is a peroxiredoxin.

== Function ==
SRPX2 is distributed on synapses throughout the cerebral cortex and hippocampus, largely in the same areas as vesicular glutamate transporter 1 and DLG4. It is involved in synapse formation and is more highly expressed in childhood. Overexpression of SRPX2 results in increased density of vesicular glutamate transporter 1 and DLG4 clusters on cortical neurons. Deficiency results in decreased dendritic spine density of excitatory glutamatergic synapses, while inhibitory GABAergic synapses are unaffected. Length or shape of spines is not affected by SPRX2, however.

== Clinical significance ==
Mutations in SRPX2 were linked in one 2006 study to a family with a form of Rolandic epilepsy with intellectual disability and speech dyspraxia, however later studies showed that mutations in SRPX2 do not necessarily lead to epilepsy or intellectual disability. Additionally, no mutations in SRPX2 have been reported with Rolandic epilepsy since. In mice, mutations in SRPX2 lead to decreased frequency of ultrasonic vocalisations in pups when separated from mothers.

== Interactions ==
FOXP2 directly reduces SRPX2 expression, by binding to its promoter. However, FOXP2 also reduces dendritic length, which SRPX2 does not affect, indicating it has other regulatory roles in dendritic morphology.
