= Jenni Ogden =

New Zealand psychology researcher and writer

Jenni Ogden FRSNZ
- Born: Jennifer Ann Ogden
- Education: University of Auckland
- Scientific career
- Fields: Clinical neuropsychology
- Thesis: Out of mind, out of sight: unilateral spatial disorders in brain-damaged patients (1983)
- Doctoral advisor: Michael Corballis

Jennifer Ann Ogden FRSNZ is a New Zealand clinical neuropsychologist, and was an associate professor in the Department of Psychology, University of Auckland. She is a fiction and non-fiction author, and has been a Fellow of the Royal Society Te Apārangi since 1999.

== Early life and education ==
Ogden was born in Ashburton, and studied to be a vet at Massey University before switching to neuroscience.

== Career ==
Ogden has a PhD from the University of Auckland completed in 1983, titled Out of mind, out of sight: unilateral spatial disorders in brain-damaged patients, supervised by Michael Corballis.

Ogden had a one-year fellowship at the Massachusetts Institute of Technology, where she became one of a small number of neuroscientists granted access to famous amnesiac Henry Molaison. Molaison had lost all memory during an operation to control epileptic seizures. Ogden ran the postgraduate clinical psychology programme at the University of Auckland, where she was an associate professor in the Department of Psychology. Later she retired to Great Barrier Island to write.

Ogden wrote a textbook about brain disorders, Fractured Minds: A Case-Study Approach to Clinical Neuropsychology, which is used in undergraduate and postgraduate teaching and is in second edition. She also wrote a neuropsychology book aimed at the general reader, Trouble in Mind, about 14 patients, including Molaison. Her book included the only known photo of Molaison, which was taken against MIT guidelines.

== Fiction writing ==
Ogden has written three works on fiction on neurological themes. Her first novel, A Drop in the Ocean, which was published in 2016, featuring a neurologist who loses research funding. The book won several awards, including the Gold Nautilus Book Award for Fiction, the Gold Sarton Women's Book Award for Contemporary Fiction, a Gold Award in the Independent Publisher Book Awards for Best Fiction, Australia and NZ, and a Silver Award in the Readers' Favorite International Book Awards for Women's Fiction awards. Her second novel, The Moon is Missing, was published in September 2020.

== Awards and honours ==
Ogden was awarded the Distinguished Career Award by the International Neuropsychological Society in 2015. Ogden was elected as a Fellow of the Royal Society Te Apārangi in 1999.

== Selected publications ==
- Ogden JA (1 January 1985). "Anterior-posterior interhemispheric differences in the loci of lesions producing visual hemineglect". Brain and Cognition. 4 (1): 59–75. doi:10.1016/0278-2626(85)90054-5. ISSN 0278-2626. PMID 4027055. Wikidata Q41502175.
- Ogden JA (1 June 1993). "Visual object agnosia, prosopagnosia, achromatopsia, loss of visual imagery, and autobiographical amnesia following recovery from cortical blindness: case M.H.". Neuropsychologia. 31 (6): 571–589. doi:10.1016/0028-3932(93)90053-3. ISSN 0028-3932. PMID 8341415. Wikidata Q48275812.
- Ogden JA; Mee EW; Henning M (1 October 1993). "A prospective study of impairment of cognition and memory and recovery after subarachnoid hemorrhage". Neurosurgery. 33 (4): 572-86; discussion 586-7. doi:10.1227/00006123-199310000-00004. ISSN 0148-396X. PMID 8232796. Wikidata Q52033103.
- J. A. Ogden; T. Utley; E. W. Mee (1 July 1997). "Neurological and psychosocial outcome 4 to 7 years after subarachnoid hemorrhage" (PDF). Neurosurgery. 41 (1): 25–34. doi:10.1097/00006123-199707000-00008. ISSN 0148-396X. PMID 9218292. Wikidata Q48673507.
