= Irene Miguel-Aliaga =

Spanish-British physiologist

Irene Miguel-Aliaga FRS FMedSci
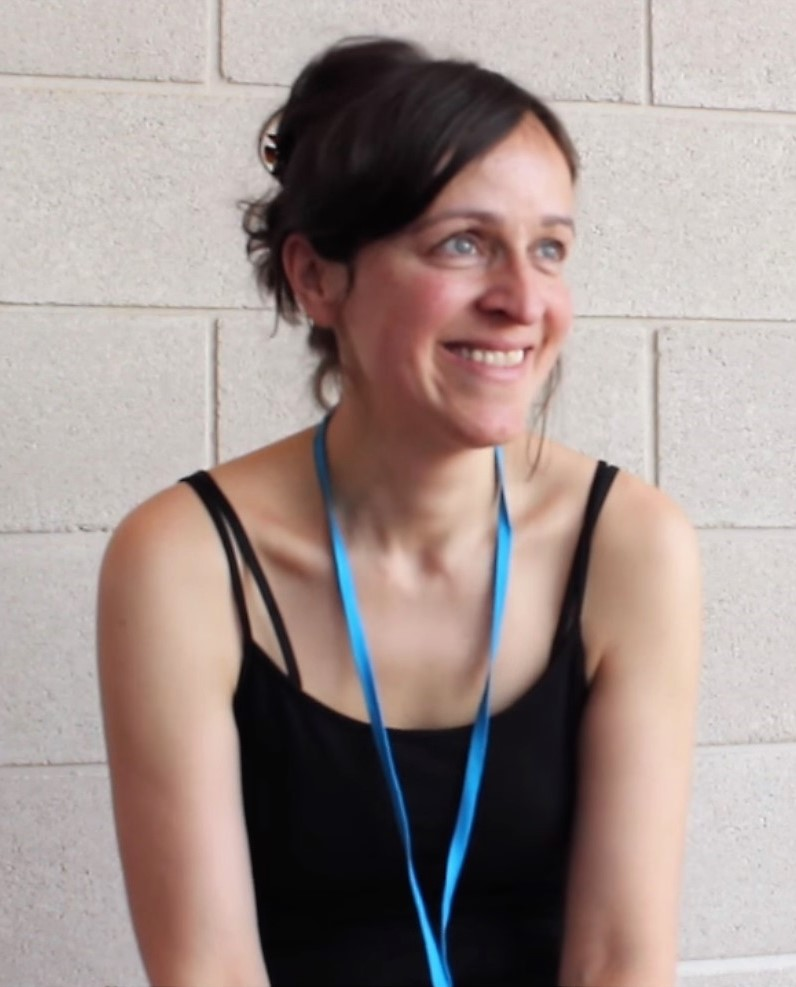
- Miguel-Aliaga in 2015
- Education: University of Oxford (DPhil)
- Awards: EMBO Member (2017); Suffrage Science award (2018)
- Scientific career
- Workplaces: Imperial College London; National Institute for Medical Research; University of Cambridge; Harvard University; Linköping University
- Thesis: Spinal muscular atrophy : of flies, worms and men (2000)
- Doctoral advisor: Kay Davies
- Website: www.imperial.ac.uk/people/i.miguel-aliaga

Irene Miguel-Aliaga FRS FMedSci is a Spanish-British physiologist who is Professor of Genetics and Physiology at Imperial College London. Her research investigates the plasticity of adult organs, and why certain organs change shape in response to environmental changes. She was elected Fellow of the Royal Society in 2022.

== Early life and education ==
Miguel-Aliaga is from Spain and grew up in Barcelona. She completed her Doctor of Philosophy degree at the University of Oxford, supervised by Kay Davies on invertebrate models of human diseases.

== Research and career ==
After her PhD, she moved to the United States for postdoctoral research, joining the laboratory of Stefan Thor at Harvard University. Miguel-Aliaga then moved to Linköping University, where she characterised the neurons of Drosophila. She was awarded a Marie Skłodowska-Curie Actions fellowship and joined Alex Gould at the National Institute for Medical Research, where she studied the specification of gut-innervating insulin-producing neurons. In 2008, Miguel-Aliaga started her independent research career at the University of Cambridge. She was named a Wellcome Trust Career Development Fellow, and eventually moved to Imperial College London. At Imperial, Miguel-Aliaga serves as Professor of Genetics and Physiology.

Miguel-Aliaga's research investigates the plasticity of human organs, and in particular, how fully developed adult organs are impacted by environmental changes. To understand these processes, Miguel-Aliaga makes use of the gastrointestinal tract, as it allows for the study of how an organ senses signals from its internal and external environments. To better understand the functional significance of various organs, Miguel-Aliaga compared the intestinal epithelium of males and females. She identified that different biological sexes demonstrate different brain-gut communications, particularly during production and tumour formation. As part of this work, her group identified the communication pathways that exist between the gastrointestinal tract and other organs. She has continued to use the model organism Drosophila, as it shares over 60% of its genes with humans.

=== Awards and honours ===
- 2012 European Molecular Biology Organization young investigator
- 2015 Journal of Cell Science One to Watch
- 2017 Elected a member of the European Molecular Biology Organization (EMBO)
- 2018 European Research Council advanced grant
- 2018 Suffrage Science Women in Science Award
- 2019 Elected a Fellow the Academy of Medical Sciences (FMedSci)
- 2022 Elected a Fellow of the Royal Society (FRS)
- 2022 Mary Lyon Medal

=== Selected publications ===
Her publications include:

- Enteric neurons and systemic signals couple nutritional and reproductive status with intestinal homeostasis
- The digestive tract of Drosophila melanogaster
