= Oxford Centre for Gene Function =

Research institute in Oxford, England

Coordinates: 51.760°N 1.254°W

The Oxford Centre for Gene Function is a multidisciplinary research institute in the University of Oxford, England. It is directed by Frances Ashcroft, Kay Davies and Peter Donnelly.

It involves the departments of Human anatomy and genetics, Physiology, and Statistics.
