= Warhol (book) =

2020 biography by Blake Gopnik

- Cover of first edition (Ecco); Andy Warhol on his favorite chair, in New York, February 27, 1968, photograph by Barton Silverman
- Author: Blake Gopnik
- Audio read by: Graham Halstead
- Working title: Warhol: A Life as Art
- Cover artist: Barton Silverman (photo); Allison Saltzman (design)
- Language: English
- Subject: Andy Warhol
- Publisher: Ecco (US); Allen Lane (UK)
- Publication date: March 5, 2020 (UK); April 28, 2020 (US)
- Publication place: United States; United Kingdom
- Media type: Print (hardcover), e-book, audiobook
- Pages: 976
- ISBN: 978-0-06-229839-3 (US hardcover); 978-0-241-00338-1 (UK hardcover)
- Website: warholiana.com

Warhol (or Warhol: A Life as Art) is a 2020 biography of American artist Andy Warhol written by art critic Blake Gopnik. It was published by Allen Lane in the UK and Ecco in the US. At 976 pages in length, it has been marketed as the definitive biography of Warhol. Waldemar Januszczak of The Sunday Times wrote that "it is impossible to imagine anyone finding out much more about Andy than is recorded here. In that sense it's definitive."

== Publication ==
The book was first published in the United Kingdom as Warhol: A Life as Art in hardcover and e-book format by Allen Lane, an imprint of Penguin Books, on March 5, 2020. An audiobook narrated by Graham Halstead was first published by Penguin on April 16, 2020.

The book was published unsubtitled as Warhol in the United States in hardcover, e-book and audiobook format by Ecco, an imprint of HarperCollins, on April 28, 2020.

The front cover of the book's dust jacket was designed by Allison Saltzman and features a photograph of Andy Warhol sitting in a chair in New York on February 27, 1968, photographed by Barton Silverman.

== Reception ==
In its starred review, Kirkus Reviews called it "an immensely enjoyable book that blends snappy writing with careful exegeses of the artist's influences and techniques".

Publishers Weekly gave the book a favorable review, writing, "Gopnik's exhaustive but stylishly written and entertaining account is Warholian in the best sense—raptly engaged, colorful, open-minded, and slyly ironic."

Writing for Harper's Magazine, Gary Indiana panned the book, calling it "elephantine, ill-written, nearly insensible".

The book was also reviewed by Waldemar Januszczak in The Sunday Times, Lucy Sante in The New York Times, Kathryn Hughes in The Guardian, Stephen Metcalf in the Los Angeles Times, Roger Lewis in The Times, Dominic Green in The Wall Street Journal, and Paul Alexander in The Washington Post.

== Publication history ==
- Warhol: A Life as Art. London: Allen Lane. 5 March 2020. ISBN 978-0-241-00338-1.
- Warhol. New York: Ecco. 21 April 2020. ISBN 978-0-06-229839-3.
