= Alison Gopnik =

American psychologist (born 1955)

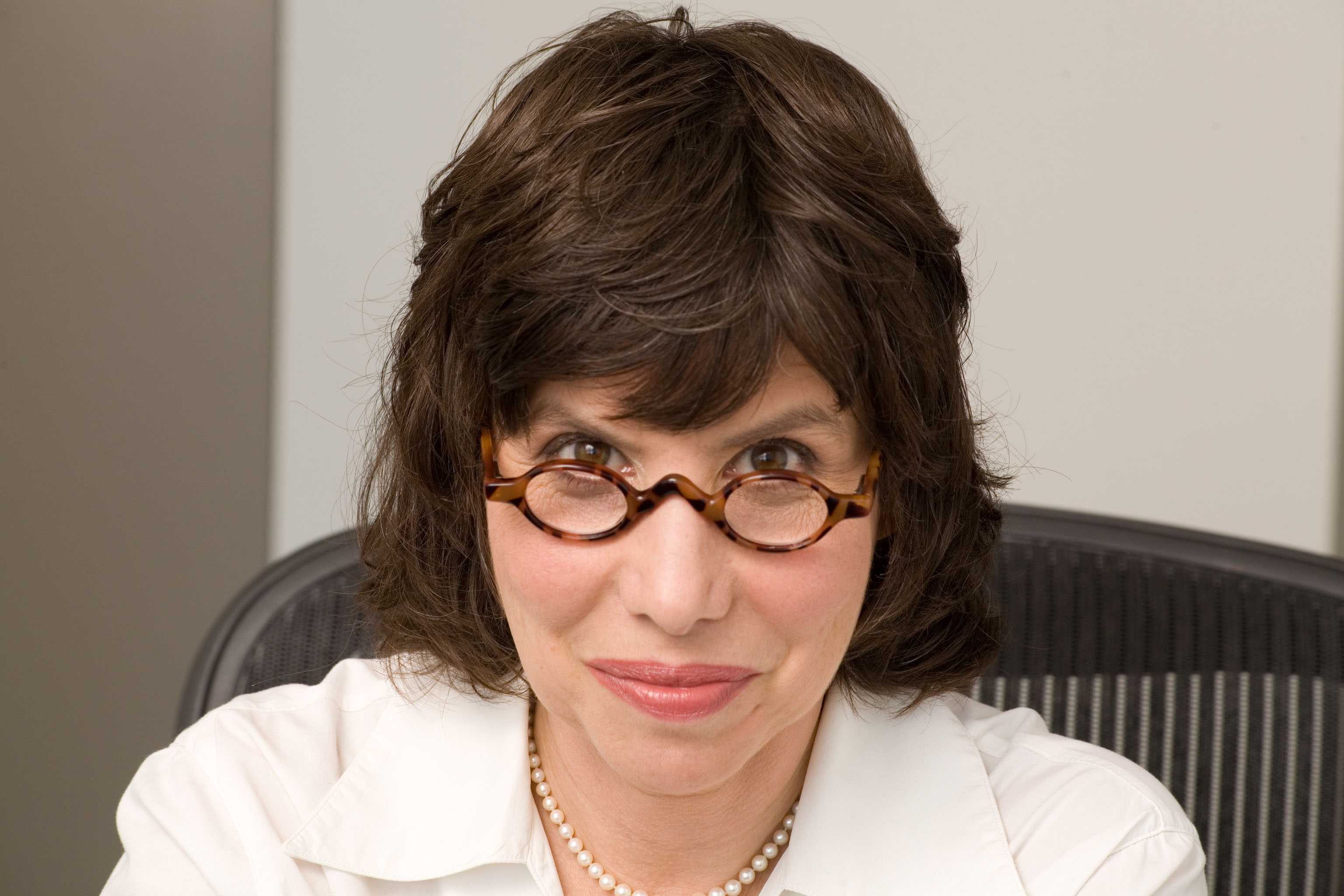
- Gopnik in 2008
- Born: June 16, 1955 (age 71); Philadelphia, Pennsylvania, U S.
- Citizenship: American
- Education: McGill University; University of Oxford
- Known for: Theory of mind, theory theory, causal learning
- Spouses: George Lewinski (m. 1975–2007); Alvy Ray Smith (m. 2010)
- Children: 3
- Parent: Myrna Gopnik (mother)
- Relatives: Adam Gopnik (brother); Blake Gopnik (brother)
- Awards: Carl Sagan Prize for Science Popularization (2021); James McKeen Cattell Fellow Award (2021)
- Scientific career
- Fields: Developmental psychology
- Workplaces: University of California, Berkeley
- Thesis: The development of non-nominal expressions in 12–24 month old children (1980)
- Doctoral advisor: Jerome Bruner
- Website: alisongopnik.com

Alison Gopnik (born June 16, 1955) is an American professor of psychology and affiliate professor of philosophy at the University of California, Berkeley and a member of the Berkeley AI research group. She is known for her work in the areas of cognitive and language development, including the effect of language on thought, the development of a theory of mind, and causal learning. Her writing on psychology and cognitive science has appeared in The New York Times, The Wall Street Journal, The Atlantic, Science, Scientific American, The Times Literary Supplement, The New York Review of Books, New Scientist, Slate and others. Her body of work also includes four books and over 160 journal articles.

She has frequently appeared on TV, radio, and podcasts including The Charlie Rose Show, The Ezra Klein Show, and The Colbert Report. Slate writes of Gopnik, "One of the most prominent researchers in the field, Gopnik is also one of the finest writers, with a special gift for relating scientific research to the questions that parents and others most want answered. This is where to go if you want to get into the head of a baby." Gopnik was the monthly Mind and Matter columnist for The Wall Street Journal from 2013 to 2023.

== Academic career ==
Gopnik earned a B.A. in psychology and philosophy from McGill University in 1975. In 1980, she earned a D.Phil. in experimental psychology from the University of Oxford. She worked at the University of Toronto before joining the faculty at UC Berkeley in 1988.

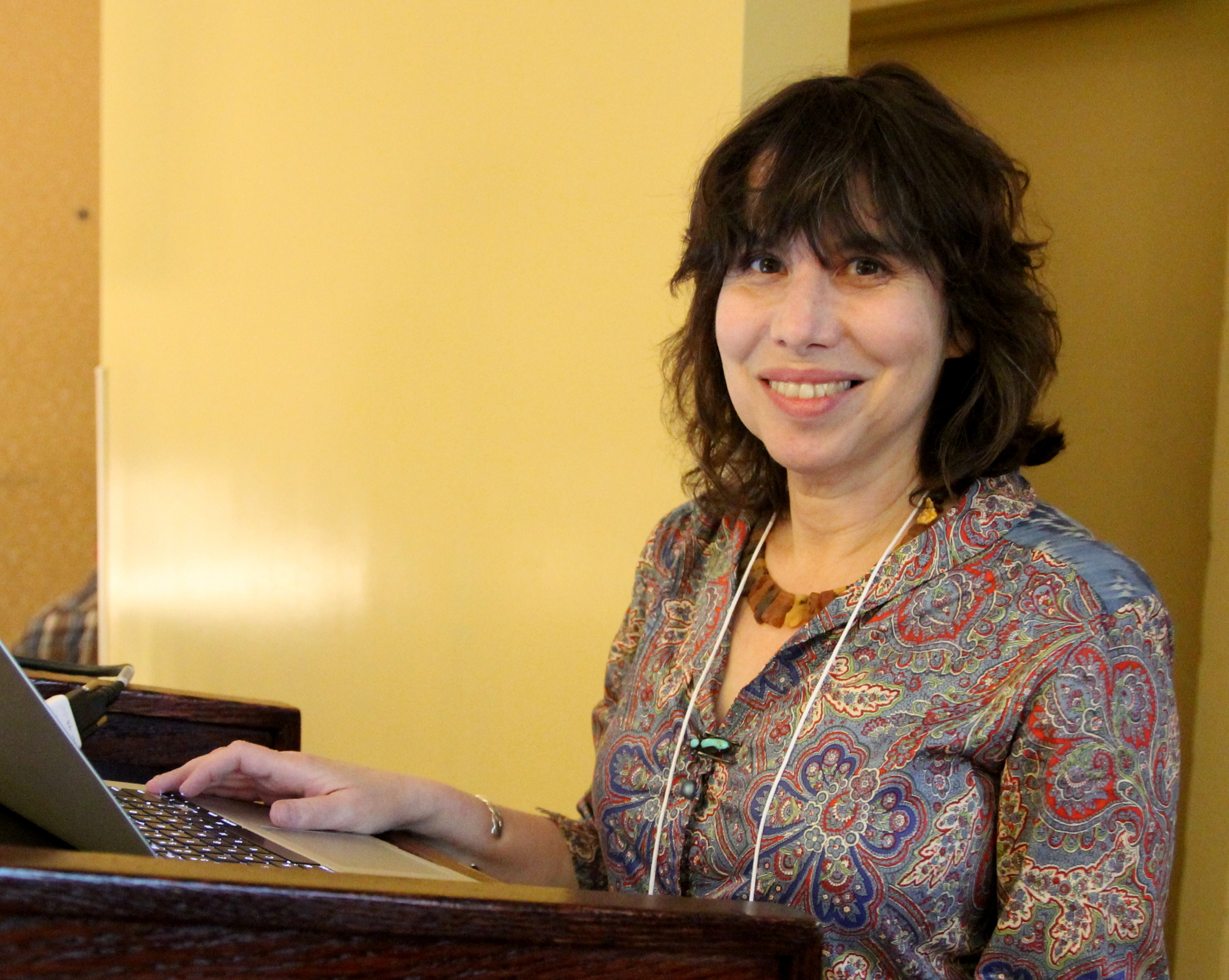
Lecturing at SkeptiCal – Berkeley, CA – April 21, 2012 – "The Philosophical Baby: What Children's Minds Tell us about Truth, Love and the Meaning of Life"

Gopnik has carried out extensive work in applying Bayesian networks to human learning and has published and presented numerous papers on the topic. Gopnik says of this work, "The interesting thing about Bayes nets is that they search out causes rather than mere associations. They give you a single representational structure for dealing both with things that just happen and with interventions—things you observe others doing to the world or things you do to the world. This is important because there is something really special about the way we treat and understand human action. We give it a special status in terms of our causal inferences. We think of human actions as things that you do that are designed to change things in the world as opposed to other events that just take place."

Judea Pearl, developer of Bayesian networks, says Gopnik was one of the first psychologists to note that the mathematical models also resemble how children learn. Gopnik's work at Berkeley's Child Study Center seeks to develop mathematical models of how children learn. These models could be used to develop better algorithms for artificial intelligence.

Gopnik has received the APS Lifetime Achievement Cattell and William James Awards, the SRCD Lifetime Achievement Award, the APA Distinguished Scientific Contributions Award, the Bradford Washburn and Carl Sagan Awards for Science Communication, and the Rumelhart Prize for Theoretical Foundations of Cognitive Science. She was elected to the National Academy of Sciences in 2025 and is a member of the American Academy of Arts and Sciences and a Cognitive Science Society, American Association for the Advancement of Science, and Guggenheim Fellow. She was 2022-23 President of the Association for Psychological Science.

== Notable publications ==
Gopnik is an authority on the philosophy of mind and a preeminent developmental psychologist. Gopnik is known for advocating the "theory theory" which postulates that the same mechanisms used by scientists to develop scientific theories are used by children to develop causal models of their environment. The "theory theory" was explored in "Words, Thoughts, and Theories," co-authored with Andrew N. Meltzoff. Gopnik co-authored with Andrew N. Meltzoff and Patricia K. Kuhl "The Scientist in the Crib: What Early Learning Tells Us About the Mind." The book posits that the cognitive development of children in early life is made possible by three factors: innate knowledge, advanced learning ability, and the evolved ability of parents to teach their offspring. "Causal Learning: Psychology, Philosophy, and Computation," edited with Laura Schulz, explores causal learning and the interdisciplinary work done in furthering the understanding of learning and reasoning.

In her book "The Philosophical Baby: What Children's Minds Tell Us about Truth, Love, and the Meaning of Life," Gopnik explores how infants and young children cognitively develop by using processes similar to those used by scientists, including experimenting on their environment. The book explains how an environment maximized for an infant's cognitive development is one that is safe to explore. The book also explores what babies can tell us about love, imagination and identity, as well as considering the broader philosophical significance of care-giving. "The Philosophical Baby" has been recognized as a New York Times Extended List Bestseller, a San Francisco Chronicle Bestseller, and an Independent Bookstores Bestseller. It has also received acclaim on the New York Times Editor's Choice list, the San Francisco Chronicle Editors Choice list, and as one of Babble's 50 Best Parenting Books. It has also been recognized as recommended reading by Scientific American.

In 2009, Gopnik published a paper in Hume Studies arguing that the historical record regarding the circumstances around David Hume's authoring of A Treatise of Human Nature are wrong. Gopnik argued that Hume had access to the library of the Royal College at La Flèche, a Jesuit institution that had been founded by Henri IV. At the time Hume was living nearby and working on the Treatise, La Flèche was home to a Jesuit missionary named Charles François Dolu, a learned man who was an expert on different world religions who had visited the French embassy in Siam. In addition, Dolu had met Ippolito Desideri, another Jesuit missionary who had visited Tibet from 1716 to 1721. Gopnik argues that because of his exposure to Theravada Buddhism, Dolu may form the source of the Buddhist influence on Hume's Treatise. Gopnik cites a number of letters from Hume that mention his time at La Flèche and his meeting with Jesuits from the college. It is from this Buddhist connection through the learning of the Jesuit college that Hume is influenced to deny the ontological reality of the self—which Gopnik links to the Buddhist idea of Śūnyatā (Emptiness).

The feature-length documentary film The Singularity by independent filmmaker Doug Wolens (released at the end of 2012), showcasing Gopnik's work in cognitive development as it relates to computer learning, has been acclaimed as "a large-scale achievement in its documentation of futurist and counter-futurist ideas" and "the best documentary on the Singularity to date."

== Personal life ==
Gopnik is the daughter of linguist Myrna Gopnik. She is Jewish. She is the firstborn of six siblings who include Blake Gopnik, an art critic and biographer, and Adam Gopnik, a writer for The New Yorker. She was formerly married to journalist George Lewinski and has three sons and six grandchildren. In 2010, she married computer graphics pioneer Alvy Ray Smith, the co-founder of Pixar.

== Bibliography ==
- The Gardener and the Carpenter: What the New Science of Child Development Tells Us About the Relationship Between Parents and Children (Farrar, Straus and Giroux, 2016, ISBN 978-0374229702)
- The Philosophical Baby: What Children's Minds Tell Us About Truth, Love, and the Meaning of Life (hardcover: Farrar, Straus and Giroux, 2009, ISBN 978-0312429843) (softcover: Picador, 2010, ISBN 978-0312429843)
- Causal Learning: Psychology, Philosophy, and Computation (Edited with Laura Schulz) (Oxford University Press, 2007, ISBN 978-0195176803)
- The Scientist in the Crib: What Early Learning Tells Us About the Mind (with Andrew N. Meltzoff and Patricia K. Kuhl) (hardcover: William Morrow, 1999, ISBN 978-0688159887) (softcover: HarperCollins Publishers, 2000, ISBN 978-0688177881)
- Words, Thoughts, and Theories (with Andrew N. Meltzoff) (hardcover: The MIT Press, 1996, ISBN 978-0262071758) (softcover: A Bradford Book, 1998, ISBN 978-0262571265)
