= Blake Gopnik =

American art critic (born 1963)

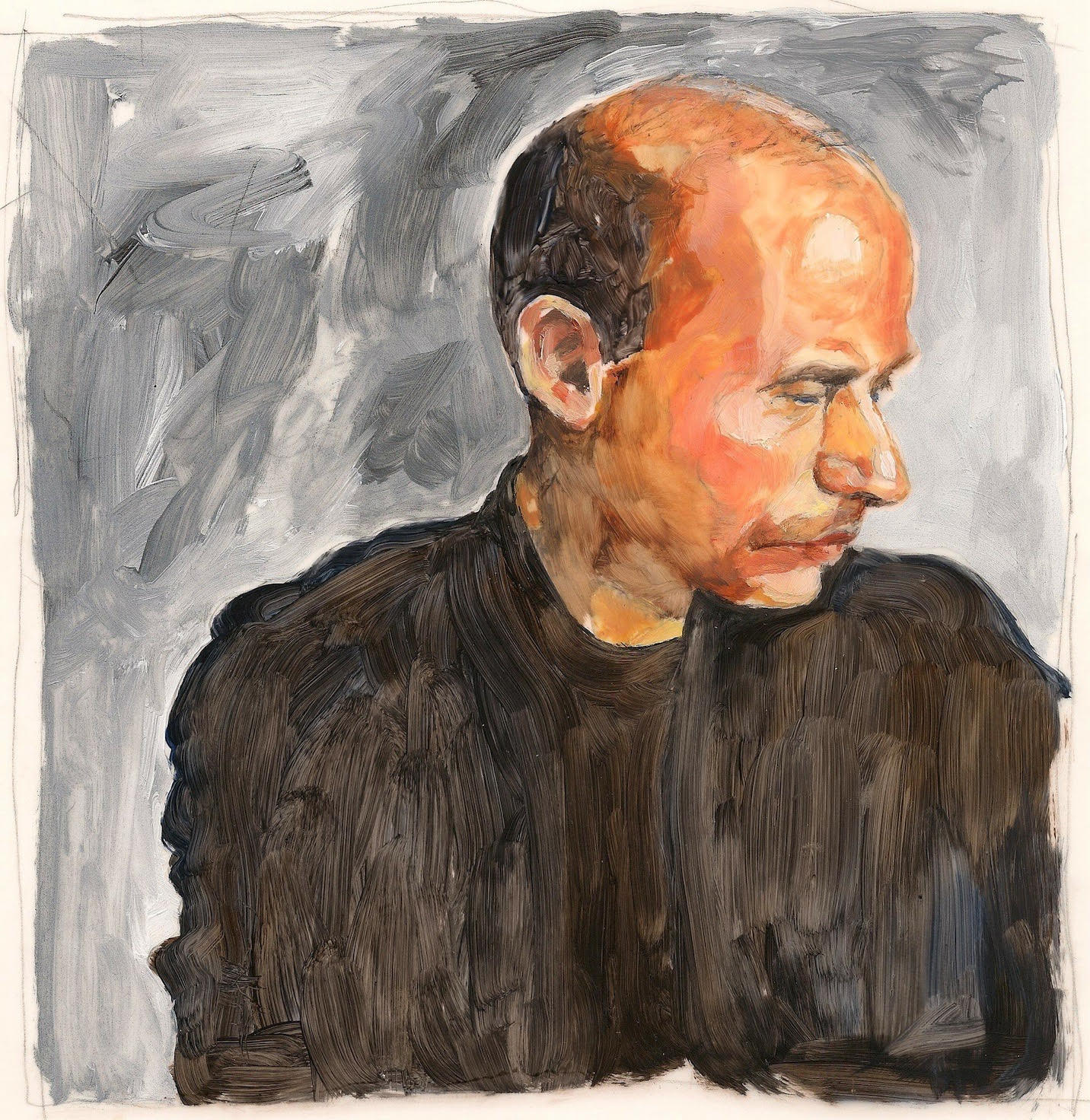
- 2011 portrait of Gopnik by Carole Freeman
- Born: 1963 (age 62–63); Philadelphia, Pennsylvania, US
- Occupation: Art critic
- Notable work: Warhol
- Parent: Myrna Gopnik (mother)
- Relatives: Alison Gopnik (sister); Adam Gopnik (brother)
- Website: blakegopnik.com

Blake Gopnik (born 1963) is an American art critic who has lived in New York City since 2011. He previously spent a decade as chief art critic of The Washington Post, prior to which he was an arts editor and critic in Canada. He has a doctorate in art history from Oxford University. He is the author of Warhol, a biography of the American artist Andy Warhol.

== Early life and education ==
Gopnik was born in Philadelphia, in 1963, to Irwin and Myrna Gopnik, with whom he moved to Montreal as a child. He and his five siblings—Berkeley psychologist Alison, writer Adam, oceanographer Morgan, archeologist Hilary, and Melissa Gopnik, who manages a nonprofit—grew up in Moshe Safdie's brutalist housing community, Habitat 67.

Gopnik was educated in French at the Académie Michèle-Provost and then trained as a commercial photographer. He studied at McGill University in Montreal, where he received a bachelor's degree in medieval studies in 1988, specializing in Vulgate and medieval Latin. In 1994, he completed a doctorate at the University of Oxford on realism in Renaissance painting and the philosophy of representation.

== Career ==
After receiving his doctorate, Gopnik returned to Canada, where he held minor academic jobs, before switching to journalism. In 1995, he became the editor-in-chief of Insite, an architecture and design magazine, and was later hired as the fine arts editor at The Globe and Mail. In 1998, he became the Globe's art critic. From 2000 to 2010, Gopnik worked at The Washington Post as chief art critic. He wrote more than 500 articles about art, ranging from China's terracotta warriors to Andy Warhol's work.

In 2011, Gopnik was hired as the art and design critic at Newsweek magazine and the Daily Beast website. He is also a contributor to The New York Times.

In 2020, he published a comprehensive biography of Andy Warhol, Warhol, through HarperCollins. In 2025, he published a biography of Albert Barnes.

== Personal life ==
Gopnik is married to artist Lucy Hogg; they have one son.

== Selected books ==
- Warhol. New York: Ecco. 2020. ISBN 978-0-06-229839-3.
- The Maverick's Museum: Albert Barnes and His American Dream. 2025. HarperCollins. ISBN 9780063284036
