= Paul Corballis =

New Zealand cognitive neuroscientist

- Citizenship: New Zealand
- Education: University of Auckland (BSc, MSc), Columbia University (PhD)
- Known for: Research on visual perception and attention using EEG/ERP and neuroimaging
- Scientific career
- Fields: Cognitive neuroscience, psychology
- Workplaces: University of Auckland, Dartmouth College
- Thesis: (1997)

Paul Michael Corballis is a New Zealand cognitive neuroscientist and professor of Psychology at the University of Auckland. His research focuses on visual perception and attention, and uses electrophysiology (EEG/ERPs) and neuroimaging methods.

== Early life and education ==
Corballis is the son of academic psychologist Michael Corballis.

He completed a BSc in Psychology (1989) and an MSc in Psychology with First Class Honours (1991) at the University of Auckland. He earned a PhD in Psychology from Columbia University in 1997.

== Career ==
After his doctorate, Corballis held a postdoctoral position in the Department of Psychological and Brain Sciences at Dartmouth College. He joined the faculty at the University of Auckland School of Psychology, where he is a professor of Psychology. In an inaugural lecture hosted by the Faculty of Science, he discussed "brain mechanisms of constructive perception."

Corballis studies the neural mechanisms that support selective attention and visual perception, often using event-related potentials such as the N2pc, together with other EEG and neuroimaging techniques. Early in his career he co-authored work demonstrating noninvasive optical imaging of human brain responses during visual stimulation. His later publications and collaborations include work on lateralized ERP components associated with attentional selection.
