= Laura H. Goldstein =

British psychologist

Laura H. Goldstein is Professor of Clinical Neuropsychology at King's College London, and Honorary Consultant Clinical Psychologist at the Lishman Unit, South London and Maudsley NHS Foundation Trust.

== Selected works ==
=== Books ===
- Goldstein, Laura H; McNeil, Jane E (2013) [2003], Clinical neuropsychology : a practical guide to assessment and management for clinicians (second ed.), Hoboken, New Jersey, J. Wiley & Sons, ISBN 9780470013335
- Cull, Christine; Goldstein, Laura H (2002) [1997], The clinical psychologist's handbook of epilepsy : assessment and management (Kindle ed.), London, Routledge, ISBN 9780203288344

=== Articles ===
- Frangou, Sophia, Stuart Donaldson, Michael Hadjulis, Sabine Landau, and Laura H. Goldstein. "The Maudsley Bipolar Disorder Project: executive dysfunction in bipolar disorder I and its clinical correlates." Biological psychiatry 58, no. 11 (2005): 859–864. doi:10.1016/j.biopsych.2005.04.056
- Baron-Cohen, Simon John Harrison, Laura H. Goldstein, and Maria Wyke. "Coloured speech perception: Is synaesthesia what happens when modularity breaks down?." Perception-London-22 (1993): 419-419. OCLC 120899734
- Goldstein, Laura H., Sarah Bernard, Peter B. Fenwick, Paul W. Burgess, and Jane McNeil. "Unilateral frontal lobectomy can produce strategy application disorder." Journal of Neurology, Neurosurgery & Psychiatry 56, no. 3 (1993): 274–276. doi:10.1136/jnnp.56.3.274
