= Michael Peters (psychologist) =

Canadian psychologist

- Scientific career
- Fields: Neuropsychology
- Workplaces: University of Guelph

Michael Peters is a Canadian neuropsychologist and University professor emeritus of psychology at the University of Guelph. He is known for researching functional asymmetries in the brain, especially hand preference. Additional research is on brain size in humans and spatial ability. Cited publications are listed in Google Scholar citations. He has also studied the link between individuals' sexual orientation and their spatial processing abilities.
