= Frances Ashcroft =

British geneticist and physiologist

Professor Dame Frances Ashcroft DBE FRS FMedSci
- Born: Frances Mary Ashcroft; 15 February 1952 (age 74)
- Education: Talbot Heath School; University of Cambridge (BA, PhD)
- Awards: UNESCO award (2012); Croonian Lecture (2013)
- Scientific career
- Fields: Physiology
- Workplaces: University of Oxford; Trinity College, Oxford; University of Leicester; University of California, Los Angeles
- Thesis: Calcium electrogenesis in insect muscle (1978)
- Frances Ashcroft's voice from the BBC programme The Life Scientific, 15 May 2012
- Website: www.dpag.ox.ac.uk/team/group-leaders/frances-ashcroft

Dame Frances Mary Ashcroft (born 1952) is a British ion channel physiologist. She is Royal Society GlaxoSmithKline Research Professor at the University Laboratory of Physiology at the University of Oxford. She is a fellow of Trinity College, Oxford, and is a director of the Oxford Centre for Gene Function. Her research group has an international reputation for work on insulin secretion, type II diabetes and neonatal diabetes. Her work with Andrew Hattersley has helped enable children born with diabetes to switch from insulin injections to tablet therapy.

== Education ==
Ashcroft was educated at Talbot Heath School and the University of Cambridge where she was awarded a BA degree in Natural Sciences followed by a PhD degree in zoology in 1978.

== Career and research ==
Ashcroft then did postdoctoral research at the University of Leicester and the University of California at Los Angeles. Ashcroft is a director of Oxion: Ion Channels and Disease Initiative, a research and training programme on integrative ion channel research, funded by the Wellcome Trust.

Ashcroft's research focuses on ATP-sensitive potassium (K_{ATP})channels and their role in insulin secretion. Ashcroft is working towards explaining how a rise in the blood glucose concentration stimulates the release of insulin from the pancreatic beta-cells, what goes wrong with this process in type 2 diabetes, and how drugs used to treat this condition exert their beneficial effects. Ashcroft has authored a few science and popular science books based on ion channel physiology:

- Ion Channels and Disease: Channelopathies on channelopathic diseases
- Life at the Extremes: The Science of Survival
- The Spark of Life: Electricity in the Human Body

Her work has helped people with neonatal diabetes, a very rare disease, switch from insulin injections to oral drug therapy.

=== Honours and awards ===
Ashcroft was elected a Fellow of the Royal Society in 1999. In 2007, Ashcroft was awarded the Walter B. Cannon Award, the highest honour bestowed by the American Physiological Society. She was one of five 2012 winners of the L'Oreal-UNESCO Award for Women in Science.

Ashcroft was awarded an honorary degrees of Doctor of the University from The Open University in 2003 and Doctor of Science from the University of Leicester on 13 July 2007.

Ashcroft was awarded the Croonian Medal and Lecture by the Royal Society in 2013.

In the 2015 Birthday Honours, she was appointed a Dame Commander of the Order of the British Empire (DBE) "for services to Medical Science and the Public Understanding of Science". She was elected a Fellow of the Academy of Medical Sciences (FMedSci) in 1999.

A. S. Byatt's novel A Whistling Woman is half dedicated to Ashcroft.

== Personal life ==
Ashcroft appeared (as a diner) on MasterChef during the 2011 series, alongside several other Fellows of the Royal Society.
