= Lesley Joy Rogers =

Australian neurobiologist

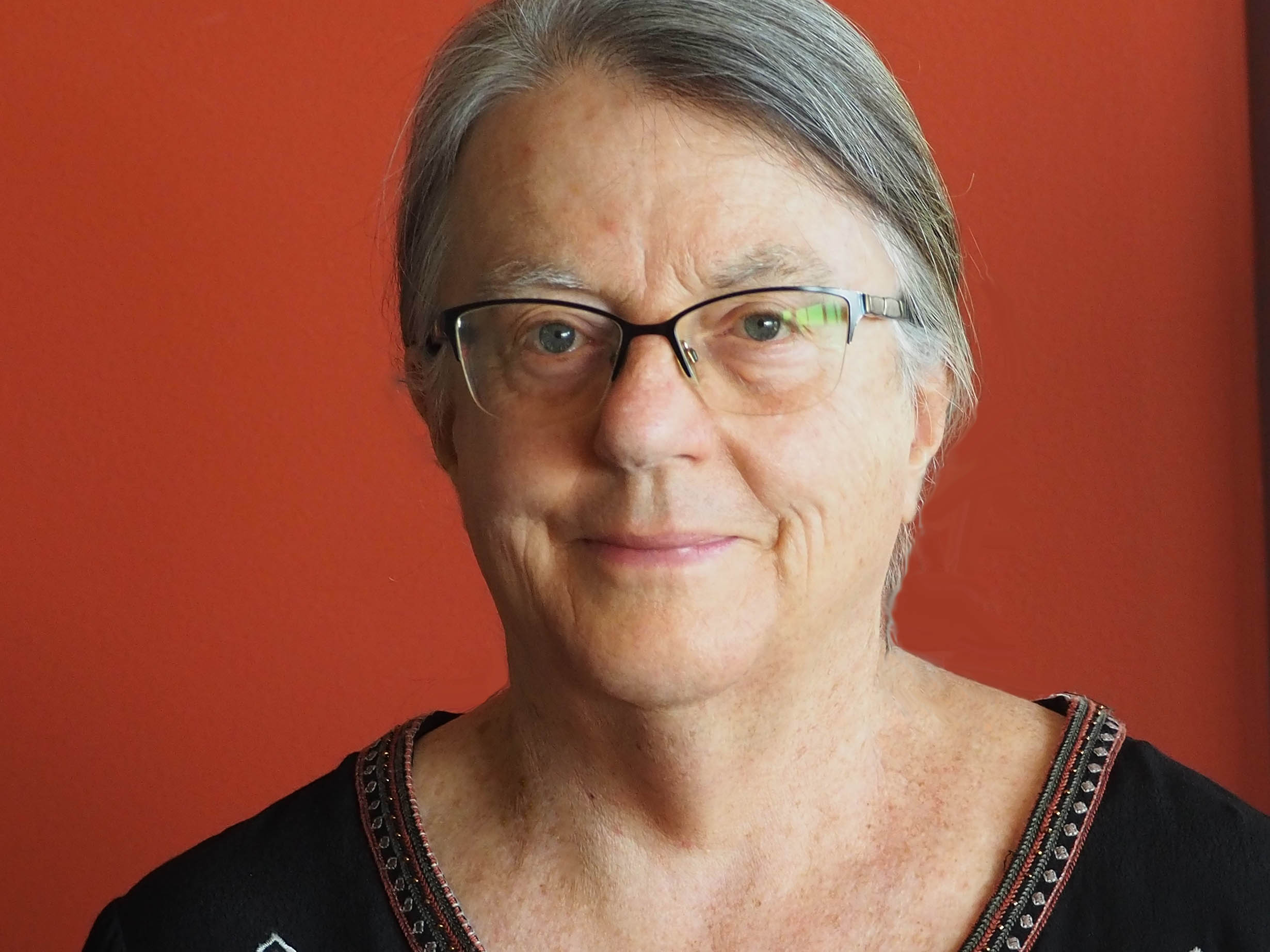
- Born: 31 July 1943 (age 83); Brisbane
- Education: University of Adelaide; Sussex University
- Scientific career
- Fields: Neuroscience, animal behaviour, physiology
- Workplaces: University of New England
- Website: www.une.edu.au/staff-profiles/science-and-technology/lrogers

Lesley Joy Rogers (born 31 July 1943) is a neurobiologist and emeritus professor of neuroscience and animal behaviour at the University of New England.

== Academic career and education ==
Rogers obtained Bachelor of Science with honours at the University of Adelaide in 1964. She worked in various positions at Harvard University, New England Medical Centre Hospital, University of Sussex, and Open University. She obtained her Doctor of Philosophy in 1971 and a Doctor of Science in 1987, both from the University of Sussex.

In 2000, Rogers was made a Fellow of the Australian Academy of Science.

In 2003, she was awarded the Clarke Medal in zoology from the Royal Society of New South Wales, and also received the Vice-Chancellor's Award for Excellence in Research, the Academic Women's Special Achievement Award and also the Centenary Medal in 2003.

In 2009, Rogers was a member of the Voiceless Scientific Expert Advisory Panel.

== Publications ==
Professor Rogers has published over 200 journal articles and 14 books predominantly focussing on the brain and development.

=== Selected books ===
- Rogers, L.J. and Vallortigara, G. (eds) (2017) Lateralized Brain Functions: Methods in Human and Non-human Species. Springer Nature, Humana Press. ISBN 978-1-4939-6723-0 . (Print) 978-1-4939-6725-4 (Online). NeuroMethods Series, vol. 122.
- Rogers, Lesley J; Vallortigara, Giorgio; Andrew, Richard J (2013). "Divided Brains: The Biology and Behaviour of Brain Asymmetries". Cambridge University Press . ISBN 9780521183048.
- Rogers, L.J. and Kaplan, G. (2004) Comparative Vertebrate Cognition: Are Primates Superior to Nonprimates? Kluwer Academic/Plenum, New York. ISBN 0-306-47727-0.
- Kaplan, G. and Rogers, L.J. (2003) Gene Worship: Moving Beyond the Nature/Nurture Debate Over Genes, Brain, and Gender. OtherPress, New York. ISBN 1-59051-034-8.
- Rogers, L.J. and Andrew, R.J. (2002) Comparative Vertebrate Lateralization. Cambridge University Press, New York. ISBN 0521781612. Re-issued in 2008 - ISBN 978-0-521-78161-9 Hbk and 978-0-521-78700-0 Pbk.
- Kaplan, G. and Rogers, L.J. (1999) The Orang-utans. Allen and Unwin, St Leonards. ISBN 1-86508-124-8. Also published by Perseus/Hellix Press, N.Y., 2000. ISBN 0-7382-0290-8.
- Rogers, L.J. and Kaplan, G. (2000) Song, Roars and Rituals: Communication in Birds, Mammals and Other Animals. Harvard University Press, Cambridge, MA. ISBN 0-674-00058-7.
- Rogers, L.J. (1999) Sexing the Brain. Weidenfeld and Nicolson, London ISBN 0-297-84276-5. Also published by Columbia University Press, New York in 2001 (hardback ISBN 0231120109 and paperback 023112011) and by Phoenix Paperback, London, in 2000 (ISBN 0-75381-023-9).
- Rogers, L.J. (1997) Minds of their Own: Animal Thinking and Awareness. Allen and Unwin, St Leonards ISBN 1-86448-504-3. Also published by Westview Press, Colorado, in 1998 ISBN 0-8133-9065-6.
- Rogers, L.J. (1995) The Development of Brain and Behaviour in the Chicken, CAB International, Wallingford, UK. ISBN 0-85198-924-1.
- Bradshaw, J.L. and Rogers, L.J. (1993) The Evolution of Lateral Asymmetries, Language, Tool Use and Intellect, Academic Press. ISBN 0-12-124560-8.

=== Selected Journal articles ===
Refereed research papers only

- Rogers, Lesley J. (29 April 2020). "Asymmetry of Motor Behavior and Sensory Perception: Which Comes First?". Symmetry. 12 (5): 690. Bibcode:2020Symm...12..690R. doi:10.3390/sym12050690. hdl:1959.11/29196.
- Vallortigara, Giorgio; Rogers, Lesley J. (March 2020). "A function for the bicameral mind". Cortex. 124: 274–285. doi:10.1016/j.cortex.2019.11.018. PMID 32058074. S2CID 209382366.
- Rogers; Kaplan (13 August 2019). "Does Functional Lateralization in Birds Have any Implications for Their Welfare?". Symmetry. 11 (8): 1043. Bibcode:2019Symm...11.1043R. doi:10.3390/sym11081043. hdl:1959.11/27455.
- Rogers, Lesley; Koboroff, Adam; Kaplan, Gisela (1 December 2018). "Lateral Asymmetry of Brain and Behaviour in the Zebra Finch, Taeniopygia guttata". Symmetry. 10 (12): 679. Bibcode:2018Symm...10..679R. doi:10.3390/sym10120679. hdl:1959.11/26425.
- Rogers, Lesley J. (18 April 2017). "A Matter of Degree: Strength of Brain Asymmetry and Behaviour". Symmetry. 9 (4): 57. Bibcode:2017Symm....9...57R. doi:10.3390/sym9040057. S2CID 14144778.
- Rogers, L. J.; Frasnelli, E.; Versace, E. (8 July 2016). "Lateralized antennal control of aggression and sex differences in red mason bees, Osmia bicornis". Scientific Reports. 6 (1) 29411. Bibcode:2016NatSR...629411R. doi:10.1038/srep29411. PMC 4937407. PMID 27388686.
- Rogers, Lesley; Vallortigara, Giorgio (2 December 2015). "When and Why Did Brains Break Symmetry?". Symmetry. 7 (4): 2181–2194. Bibcode:2015Symm....7.2181R. doi:10.3390/sym7042181.
- Rogers, Lesley J. (June 2014). "Asymmetry of brain and behavior in animals: Its development, function, and human relevance". Genesis. 52 (6): 555–571. doi:10.1002/dvg.22741. PMID 24408478. S2CID 41644990.
- Rogers, Lesley J.; Rigosi, Elisa; Frasnelli, Elisa; Vallortigara, Giorgio (27 June 2013). "A right antenna for social behaviour in honeybees". Scientific Reports. 3 (1): 2045. Bibcode:2013NatSR...3.2045R. doi:10.1038/srep02045. PMC 3694496. PMID 23807465.
- Kaplan, Gisela; Rogers, Lesley J. (23 July 2013). "Stability of referential signalling across time and locations: testing alarm calls of Australian magpies (Gymnorhina tibicen) in urban and rural Australia and in Fiji". PeerJ. 1 e112. doi:10.7717/peerj.112. PMC 3728765. PMID 23904991.
- Kaplan, Gisela; Pines, Mathew K.; Rogers, Lesley J. (March 2012). "Stress and stress reduction in common marmosets". Applied Animal Behaviour Science. 137 (3–4): 175–182. doi:10.1016/j.applanim.2011.04.011.
- Rogers, Lesley J. (3 December 2011). "The two hemispheres of the avian brain: their differing roles in perceptual processing and the expression of behavior". Journal of Ornithology. 153 (S1): 61–74. doi:10.1007/s10336-011-0769-z. S2CID 2345826.
- Rogers, Lesley J. (October 2010). "Relevance of brain and behavioural lateralization to animal welfare". Applied Animal Behaviour Science. 127 (1–2): 1–11. doi:10.1016/j.applanim.2010.06.008.
- Lippolis, G.; Joss, J.M.P.; Rogers, L.J. (2009). "Australian Lungfish (Neoceratodus forsteri): A Missing Link in the Evolution of Complementary Side Biases for Predator Avoidance and Prey Capture". Brain, Behavior and Evolution. 73 (4): 295–303. doi:10.1159/000230674. PMID 19641309. S2CID 6802365.
- MacNeilage, Peter F.; Rogers, Lesley J.; Vallortigara, Giorgio (July 2009). "Origins of the Left & Right Brain". Scientific American. 301 (1): 60–67. Bibcode:2009SciAm.301a..60M. doi:10.1038/scientificamerican0709-60. PMID 19555025.
- Rogers, Lesley J (4 December 2008). "Hand and paw preferences in relation to the lateralized brain". Philosophical Transactions of the Royal Society B: Biological Sciences. 364 (1519): 943–954. doi:10.1098/rstb.2008.0225. PMC 2666076. PMID 19064357.
- Rogers, Lesley J.; Vallortigara, Giorgio; Clayton, Nicola Susan (4 June 2008). "From Antenna to Antenna: Lateral Shift of Olfactory Memory Recall by Honeybees". PLOS ONE. 3 (6) e2340. Bibcode:2008PLoSO...3.2340R. doi:10.1371/journal.pone.0002340. PMC 2394662. PMID 18523636.
- Rogers, Lesley J. (June 2008). "Development and function of lateralization in the avian brain". Brain Research Bulletin. 76 (3): 235–244. doi:10.1016/j.brainresbull.2008.02.001. PMID 18498936. S2CID 26031891.
- Hook, Michelle A.; Rogers, Lesley J. (2008). "Visuospatial reaching preferences of common marmosets (Callithrix jacchus): An assessment of individual biases across a variety of tasks". Journal of Comparative Psychology. 122 (1): 41–51. doi:10.1037/0735-7036.122.1.41. PMID 18298280.
- Vallortigara, Giorgio; Rogers, Lesley J (2005). "survival with an asymmetrical brain: advantages and disadvantages of cerebral lateralization". Behavioral and Brain Sciences. 28 (4): 575–589. doi:10.1017/S0140525X05000105. hdl:1959.11/571. PMID 16209828. S2CID 11884162.
- Rogers, Lesley J.; Zucca, Paolo; Vallortigara, Giorgio (7 December 2004). "Advantages of having a lateralized brain". Proceedings of the Royal Society of London. Series B: Biological Sciences. 271 (suppl_6): S420-2. doi:10.1098/rsbl.2004.0200. PMC 1810119. PMID 15801592.
- Deng, Chao; Rogers, Lesley J (August 2002). "Prehatching visual experience and lateralization in the visual Wulst of the chick". Behavioural Brain Research. 134 (1–2): 375–385. doi:10.1016/S0166-4328(02)00050-5. PMID 12191824. S2CID 25387547.
- Rogers, Lesley J. (June 2000). "Evolution of Hemispheric Specialization: Advantages and Disadvantages". Brain and Language. 73 (2): 236–253. doi:10.1006/brln.2000.2305. PMID 10856176. S2CID 23357779.
- Vallortigara, G; Rogers, L.J; Bisazza, A (August 1999). "Possible evolutionary origins of cognitive brain lateralization". Brain Research Reviews. 30 (2): 164–175. doi:10.1016/S0165-0173(99)00012-0. PMID 10525173. S2CID 14542467.
- Cameron, R.; Rogers, L. J. (1999). "Hand preference of the common marmoset (Callithrix jacchus): Problem solving and responses in a novel setting". Journal of Comparative Psychology. 113 (2): 149–157. doi:10.1037/0735-7036.113.2.149.
- Rogers, L (1 December 1998). "Light exposure of the embryo and development of behavioural lateralisation in chicks, I: olfactory responses". Behavioural Brain Research. 97 (1–2): 195–200. doi:10.1016/S0166-4328(98)00043-6. PMID 9867244. S2CID 3991886.
- Rogers, Lesley J. (May 1990). "Light input and the reversal of functional lateralization in the chicken brain". Behavioural Brain Research. 38 (3): 211–221. doi:10.1016/0166-4328(90)90176-F. PMID 2363841. S2CID 3974928.
- Rogers, L. J. (1986). "Lateralization of Learning in Chicks". Advances in the Study of Behavior. Vol. 16. Academic Press. pp. 147–189. doi:10.1016/S0065-3454(08)60190-4. ISBN 978-0-12-004516-7.
- Rogers, Lesley J. (May 1982). "Light experience and asymmetry of brain function in chickens". Nature. 297 (5863): 223–225. Bibcode:1982Natur.297..223R. doi:10.1038/297223a0. PMID 7200573. S2CID 4349859.
- Rogers, L.J.; Anson, J.M. (May 1979). "Lateralisation of function in the chicken fore-brain". Pharmacology Biochemistry and Behavior. 10 (5): 679–686. doi:10.1016/0091-3057(79)90320-4. PMID 493285. S2CID 40292573.
- Rogers, L.J.; Miles, F.A. (December 1972). "Centrifugal control of the avian retina. V. Effects of lesions of the isthmo-optic nucleus on visual behaviour". Brain Research. 48: 147–156. doi:10.1016/0006-8993(72)90175-8. PMID 4645202.
- Andrew, R. J.; Rogers, L. J. (June 1972). "Testosterone, Search Behaviour and Persistence". Nature. 237 (5354): 343–346. Bibcode:1972Natur.237..343A. doi:10.1038/237343a0. PMID 4557402. S2CID 4218116.
- Kaplan, MarshallM.; Rogers, Lesley (November 1969). "Separation of human serum-alkaline-phosphatase isoenzymes by polyacrylamide gel electrophoresis". The Lancet. 294 (7629): 1029–1031. doi:10.1016/s0140-6736(69)90640-0. PMID 4188230.

=== Selected Book Chapters ===
- Rogers, Lesley J. (2018). "Manual bias, behavior, and cognition in common marmosets and other primates". Progress in Brain Research. Vol. 238. Elsevier. pp. 91–113. doi:10.1016/bs.pbr.2018.06.004. ISBN 978-0-12-814671-2. PMID 30097204.
- Rogers, L.J. (2017) Eye and ear preferences. In Rogers, L.J. and Vallortigara, G. (eds) Lateralized Brain Functions: Methods in Human and Non-human Species. Humana Press, Springer NeuroMethods Series, vol. 122, pp. 79–102. ISBN 978-1-4939-6723-0.
- Rogers, L.J. (2011) Sex differences are not "hard-wired". In J.A. Fisher (ed) Gender and the Science of Difference: Cultural Politics of Contemporary Science and Medicine. Rutgers University Press, New Jersey, pp. 27–42. ISBN 978-0-8135-5046-6 pbk and 978-0-8135-5047-3hbk.
- Rogers, Lesley J. (2007). "Lateralization in its many Forms, and its Evolution and Development". Special Topics in Primatology. Vol. 5. Elsevier. pp. 22–56. doi:10.1016/S1936-8526(07)05002-6. ISBN 978-0-12-374197-4.
- Rogers, L.J. and Kaplan, G. (2004) All animals are not equal: the interface between scientific knowledge and the legislation for animal rights? In C.R. Sunstein and M. C. Nussbaum (eds.) Animal Rights: Law and Policy. Oxford University Press, Oxford, pp. 175–202. (ISBN 0-195-15-217-4)
- Rogers, L.J. (2002) Lateralization in vertebrates: Its early evolution, general pattern and development. Advances in the Study of Behavior, Vol. 31, ed. by P.J.B. Slater, J. Rosenblatt, C. Snowdon and T. Roper (eds), Academic Press, San Diego, pp. 107–162. (ISBN 0-12-004531-1).
- Rogers, L.J. (2000) Evolution of side biases: Motor versus sensory lateralization. In M.K. Manas, M.B. Bulman-Fleming and G. Tiwari (eds) Side-Bias: A Neuropsychological Perspective. Kluwer, Dordrecht, The Netherlands (ISBN 0-7923-6660-3), pp. 3–40.
- Rogers, L.J. Development of Lateralisation. In: R.J. Andrew (ed.), Neural and Behavioural Plasticity: The Use of the Domestic Chicken as a Model, Oxford University Press, Oxford, pp. 507–535 (1991).
