= Faraneh Vargha-Khadem =

Cognitive neuroscientist

- Born: 1949 (age 76–77)
- Education: McGill University; University of Massachusetts
- Awards: BPS Barbara Wilson Lifetime Achievement Award (2013)
- Scientific career
- Fields: Cognitive neuroscience
- Workplaces: University College London; Montreal Children's Hospital; Great Ormond Street Hospital
- Thesis: Hemispheric specialization in congenitally deaf and hearing children and adolescents (1979)
- Doctoral advisor: Michael Corballis
- Website: iris.ucl.ac.uk/iris/browse/profile?upi=FVARG91

Faraneh Vargha-Khadem (born 1949) is a British cognitive neuroscientist specializing in developmental amnesia among children. Faraneh was a part of the team that identified the FOXP2 gene, the so-called 'speech gene', that may explain why humans talk and chimps do not.

== Education ==
Vargha-Khadem was educated at McGill University and the University of Massachusetts.

== Career and research ==
She served as head of the clinical neuropsychology service at Great Ormond Street Hospital, and director of the centre for developmental cognitive neuroscience at University College London.

She was elected a Fellow of the Academy of Medical Sciences in 2000. Faraneh was the awarded the BPS Barbara Wilson Lifetime Achievement Award in 2013.
