= FOXP2 =

Transcription factor gene of the forkhead box family

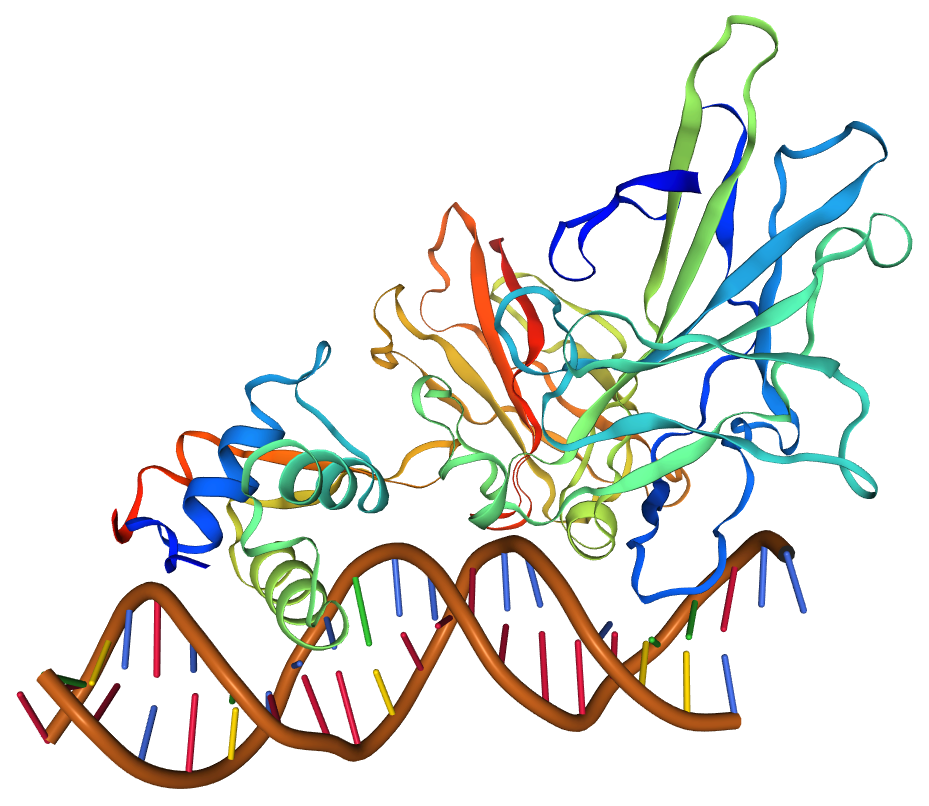

Identifiers
- Aliases: FOXP2, CAGH44, SPCH1, TNRC10, forkhead box P2
- External IDs: OMIM: 605317; MGI: 2148705; GeneCards: FOXP2
Available structures
PDB	Ortholog search: PDBe RCSB
PDB	List of PDB id codes 2AS5, 2A07

Gene location (Human)
Chr.	Chromosome 7 (human)
Band	7q31.1	Start	114,086,327 bp
Band	7q31.1	End	114,693,772 bp

Gene location (Mouse)
Chr.	Chromosome 6 (mouse)
Band	6|6 A1	Start	14,901,348 bp
Band	6|6 A1	End	15,441,976 bp
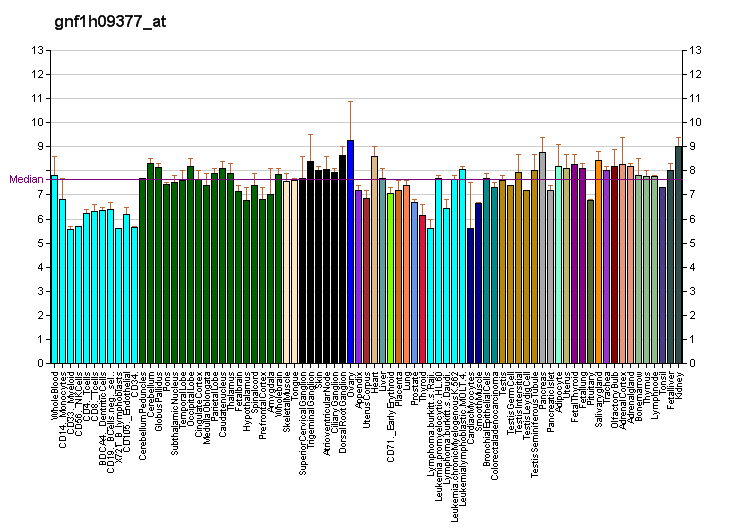
RNA expression pattern
Bgee	Human / Mouse (ortholog); Top expressed in: buccal mucosa cell; tibialis anterior muscle; mucosa of paranasal sinus; bronchial epithelial cell; endothelial cell; muscle layer of sigmoid colon; epithelium of colon; sperm; deltoid muscle; sural nerve / Top expressed in: olfactory tubercle; Rostral migratory stream; inferior colliculi; multiform layer of neocortex; medial dorsal nucleus; medial geniculate nucleus; nucleus accumbens; habenula; left lung lobe; genital tubercle; More reference expression data
BioGPS	More reference expression data
Gene ontology
Molecular function	DNA binding; sequence-specific DNA binding; protein homodimerization activity; DNA-binding transcription factor activity; metal ion binding; RNA polymerase II cis-regulatory region sequence-specific DNA binding; protein binding; protein heterodimerization activity; identical protein binding; DNA-binding transcription factor activity, RNA polymerase II-specific; androgen receptor binding; DNA-binding transcription repressor activity, RNA polymerase II-specific
Cellular component	nucleus
Biological process	positive regulation of epithelial cell proliferation involved in lung morphogenesis; regulation of transcription, DNA-templated; lung development; positive regulation of epithelial cell proliferation; negative regulation of transcription by RNA polymerase II; post-embryonic development; transcription, DNA-templated; cerebellum development; putamen development; vocal learning; positive regulation of mesenchymal cell proliferation; smooth muscle tissue development; cerebral cortex development; caudate nucleus development; camera-type eye development; lung alveolus development; righting reflex; negative regulation of transcription, DNA-templated; skeletal muscle tissue development; forebrain development; response to testosterone; innate vocalization behavior; anatomical structure morphogenesis; cell differentiation; growth
Sources:Amigo / QuickGO
Orthologs
Databases	NCBI: entry; OMA: entry
Species	Human	Mouse
Entrez	93986	114142
Ensembl	ENSG00000128573	ENSMUSG00000029563
UniProt	O15409; Q75MZ5; Q0PRL4; Q8N6B6	P58463
RefSeq (mRNA)	NM_001172766; NM_001172767; NM_014491; NM_148898; NM_148899 NM_148900	NM_053242; NM_212435; NM_001286607
RefSeq (protein)	NP_001166237; NP_001166238; NP_055306; NP_683696; NP_683697 NP_683698; NP_001166237.1; NP_683697.2	NP_001273536; NP_444472; NP_997600
Location (UCSC)	Chr 7: 114.09 – 114.69 Mb	Chr 6: 14.9 – 15.44 Mb
PubMed search
- Wikidata
View/Edit Human	View/Edit Mouse

Forkhead box protein P2 (FOXP2) is a protein that, in humans, is encoded by the FOXP2 gene. FOXP2 is a member of the forkhead box family of transcription factors, proteins that regulate gene expression by binding to DNA. It is expressed in the brain, heart, lungs and digestive system.

FOXP2 is found in many vertebrates, where it plays an important role in mimicry in birds (such as birdsong) and echolocation in bats. FOXP2 is also required for the proper development of speech and language in humans. In humans, mutations in FOXP2 cause the severe speech and language disorder developmental verbal dyspraxia. Studies of the gene in mice and songbirds indicate that it is necessary for vocal imitation and the related motor learning. Outside the brain, FOXP2 has also been implicated in development of other tissues such as the lung and digestive system.

Initially identified in 1998 as the genetic cause of a speech disorder in a British family designated the KE family, FOXP2 was the first gene discovered to be associated with speech and language and was subsequently dubbed "the language gene". However, other genes are necessary for human language development, and a 2018 analysis confirmed that there was no evidence of recent positive evolutionary selection of FOXP2 in humans.

== Structure and function ==
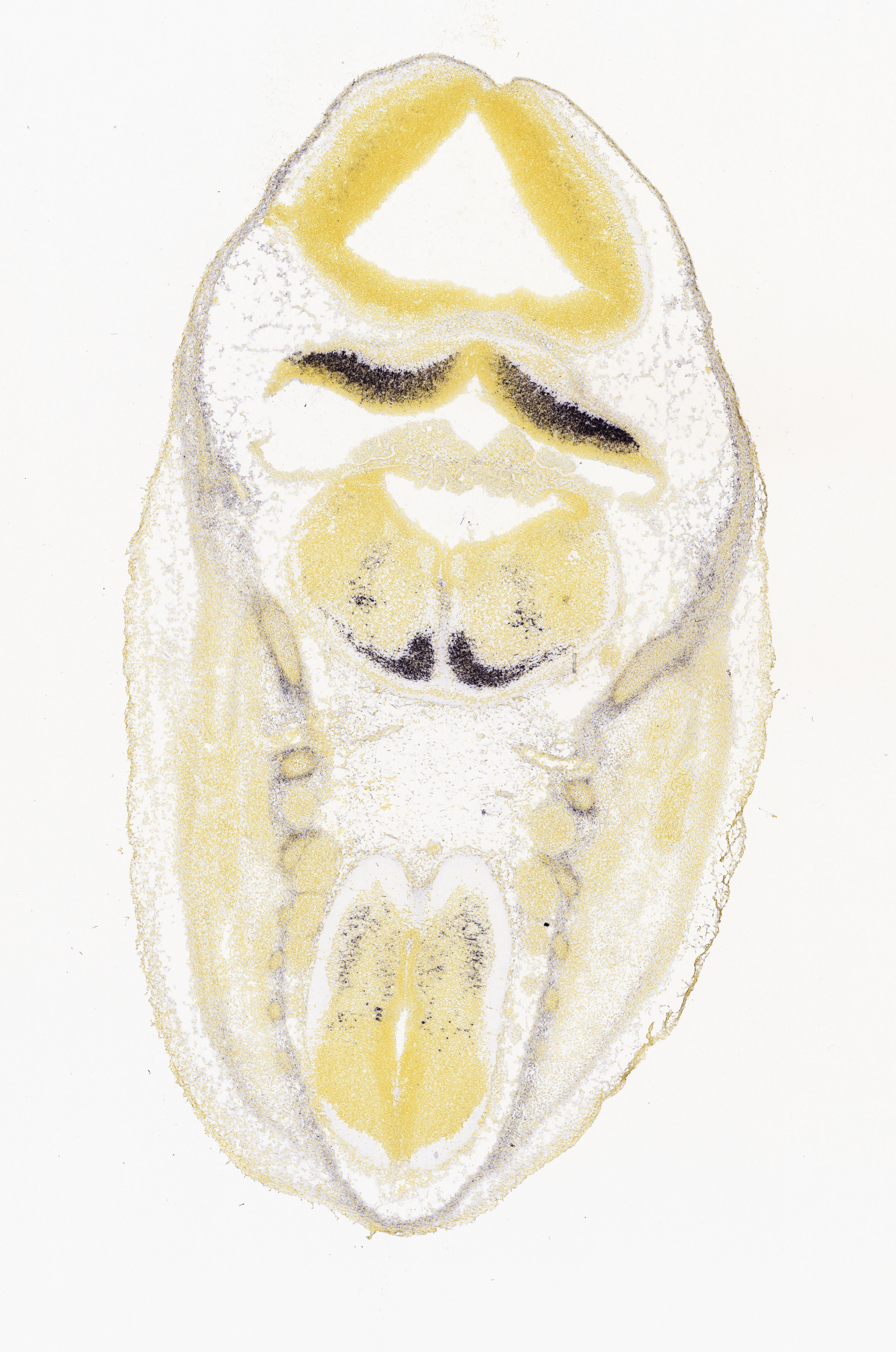
FOXP2 is expressed in the developing cerebellum and the hindbrain of the embryonic day-13.5 mouse. Allen Brain Atlases.

As a FOX protein, FOXP2 contains a forkhead-box domain. In addition, it contains a polyglutamine tract, a zinc finger and a leucine zipper. The protein binds directly to DNA to control expression of other proteins and controls their activity through the forkhead-box domain. Only a few targeted genes have been identified, however researchers believe that there could be up to hundreds of other genes targeted by the FOXP2 gene. The forkhead box P2 protein is active in the brain and other tissues before and after birth, and many studies show that it is paramount for the growth of nerve cells and transmission between them. The FOXP2 gene is also involved in synaptic plasticity, making it imperative for learning and memory.

FOXP2 is required for proper brain and lung development. Knockout mice with only one functional copy of the FOXP2 gene have significantly reduced vocalizations as pups. Knockout mice with no functional copies of FOXP2 are runted, display abnormalities in brain regions such as the Purkinje layer, and die an average of 21 days after birth from inadequate lung development.

FOXP2 is expressed in many areas of the brain, including the basal ganglia and inferior frontal cortex, where it is essential for brain maturation and speech and language development. In mice, the gene was found to be twice as highly expressed in male pups than female pups, which correlated with an almost double increase in the number of vocalisations the male pups made when separated from mothers. Conversely, in human children aged 4–5, the gene was found to be 30% more expressed in the Broca's areas of female children. The researchers suggested that the gene is more active in "the more communicative sex".

The expression of FOXP2 is subject to post-transcriptional regulation, particularly microRNA (miRNA), causing the repression of the FOXP2 3′ untranslated region.

Three amino acid substitutions distinguish the human FOXP2 protein from that found in mice, while two amino acid substitutions distinguish the human FOXP2 protein from that found in chimpanzees, but only one of these changes is unique to humans. Evidence from genetically manipulated mice and human neuronal cell models suggests that these changes affect the neural functions of FOXP2.

== Clinical significance ==
FOXP2 is a transcription factor with multiple functions among which is that it plays a role in the development of neural circuits that are involved in speech and language. It functions by regulating the genes that influence factors such as differentiation of neurons, communication between neurons, and synaptic plasticity. Additionally, FOXP2 helps coordinate the complex movements required for speech; consequently, it is highly expressed in brain regions associated with motor control and language processing, including the basal ganglia and cerebral cortex. Mutations in FOXP2 have been linked to a rare genetic speech and language disorder known as childhood apraxia of speech, which is recognized to cause impaired articulation and difficulty with grammar and comprehension. In mouse models, mutations in FOXP2 have led to deficits in motor learning and impaired synaptic plasticity, highlighting its importance in neural function. Furthermore, mice expressing a "humanized" version of the gene show significant alterations in cortico-basal ganglia circuitry. Additionally, in songbird models, knockdown of FOXP2 disrupts vocal learning, resulting in incomplete and inaccurate song imitation. These findings collectively illustrate that FOXP2 is essential for the development of the neural mechanisms underlying complex vocal communication.

The FOXP2 gene has been implicated in several cognitive functions including; general brain development, language, and synaptic plasticity. The FOXP2 gene region acts as a transcription factor for the forkhead box P2 protein. Transcription factors affect other regions, and the forkhead box P2 protein has been suggested to also act as a transcription factor for hundreds of genes. This prolific involvement opens the possibility that the FOXP2 gene is much more extensive than originally thought. Other targets of transcription have been researched without correlation to FOXP2. Specifically, FOXP2 has been investigated in correlation with autism and dyslexia, however with no mutation was discovered as the cause. One well identified target is language. Although some research disagrees with this correlation, the majority of research shows that a mutated FOXP2 causes the observed production deficiency.

There is some evidence that the linguistic impairments associated with a mutation of the FOXP2 gene are not simply the result of a fundamental deficit in motor control. Brain imaging of affected individuals indicates functional abnormalities in language-related cortical and basal ganglia regions, demonstrating that the problems extend beyond the motor system.

Mutations in FOXP2 are among several (26 genes plus 2 intergenic) loci which correlate to ADHD diagnosis in adults – clinical ADHD is an umbrella label for a heterogeneous group of genetic and neurological phenomena which may result from FOXP2 mutations or other causes.

A 2020 genome-wide association study (GWAS) implicates single-nucleotide polymorphisms (SNPs) of FOXP2 in susceptibility to cannabis use disorder.

=== Language disorder ===
It is theorized that the translocation of the 7q31.2 region of the FOXP2 gene causes a severe language impairment called developmental verbal dyspraxia (DVD) or childhood apraxia of speech (CAS) So far this type of mutation has only been discovered in three families across the world including the original KE family. A missense mutation causing an arginine-to-histidine substitution (R553H) in the DNA-binding domain is thought to be the abnormality in KE. This would cause a normally basic residue to be fairly acidic and highly reactive at the body's pH. A heterozygous nonsense mutation, R328X variant, produces a truncated protein involved in speech and language difficulties in one KE individual and two of their close family members. R553H and R328X mutations also affected nuclear localization, DNA-binding, and the transactivation (increased gene expression) properties of FOXP2.

These individuals present with deletions, translocations, and missense mutations. When tasked with repetition and verb generation, these individuals with DVD/CAS had decreased activation in the putamen and Broca's area in fMRI studies. These areas are commonly known as areas of language function. This is one of the primary reasons that FOXP2 is known as a language gene. They have delayed onset of speech, difficulty with articulation including slurred speech, stuttering, and poor pronunciation, as well as dyspraxia. It is believed that a major part of this speech deficit comes from an inability to coordinate the movements necessary to produce normal speech including mouth and tongue shaping. Additionally, there are more general impairments with the processing of the grammatical and linguistic aspects of speech. These findings suggest that the effects of FOXP2 are not limited to motor control, as they include comprehension among other cognitive language functions. General mild motor and cognitive deficits are noted across the board. Clinically these patients can also have difficulty coughing, sneezing, or clearing their throats.

While FOXP2 has been proposed to play a critical role in the development of speech and language, this view has been challenged by the fact that the gene is also expressed in other mammals as well as birds and fish that do not speak. It has also been proposed that the FOXP2 transcription-factor is not so much a hypothetical 'language gene' but rather part of a regulatory machinery related to externalization of speech. Other researchers have argued that understanding of FOXP2 and its influence upon language disorders should be considered in the context of its interaction with other co-active genes in the human genome.

== Evolution ==
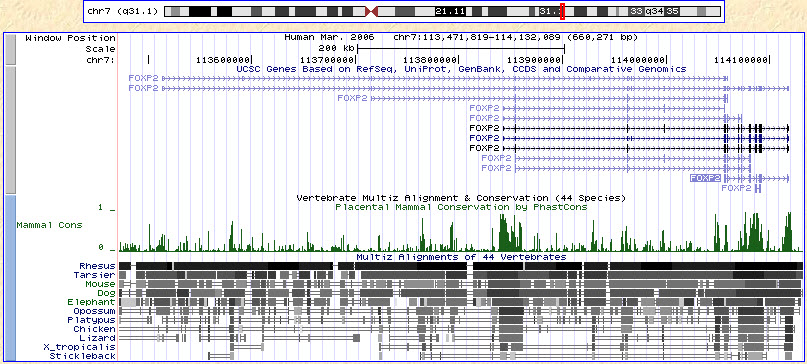
Human FOXP2 gene and evolutionary conservation is shown in a multiple alignment (at bottom of figure) in this image from the UCSC Genome Browser. Note that conservation tends to cluster around coding regions (exons).

The FOXP2 gene is highly conserved in mammals. The human gene differs from that in non-human primates by the substitution of two amino acids, a threonine to asparagine substitution at position 303 (T303N) and an asparagine to serine substitution at position 325 (N325S). In mice it differs from that of humans by three substitutions, and in zebra finch by seven amino acids. One of the two amino acid differences between human and chimps also arose independently in carnivores and bats. Similar FOXP2 proteins can be found in songbirds, fish, and reptiles such as alligators.

DNA sampling from Homo neanderthalensis bones indicates that their FOXP2 gene is a little different though largely similar to those of Homo sapiens (i.e. modern humans). Previous genetic analysis had suggested that the H. sapiens FOXP2 gene became fixed in the population around 125,000 years ago. Some researchers consider the Neanderthal findings to indicate that the gene instead swept through the population over 260,000 years ago, before our most recent common ancestor with the Neanderthals. Other researchers offer alternative explanations for how the H. sapiens version would have appeared in Neanderthals living 43,000 years ago.

According to a 2002 study, the FOXP2 gene showed indications of recent positive selection. Some researchers have speculated that positive selection is crucial for the evolution of language in humans. Others, however, were unable to find a clear association between species with learned vocalizations and similar mutations in FOXP2. A 2018 analysis of a large sample of globally distributed genomes confirmed there was no evidence of positive selection, suggesting that the original signal of positive selection may be driven by sample composition. Insertion of both human mutations into mice, whose version of FOXP2 otherwise differs from the human and chimpanzee versions in only one additional base pair, causes changes in vocalizations as well as other behavioral changes, such as a reduction in exploratory tendencies, and a decrease in maze learning time. A reduction in dopamine levels and changes in the morphology of certain nerve cells are also observed.

== Interactions ==
FOXP2 is known to regulate CNTNAP2, CTBP1, SRPX2 and SCN3A.

FOXP2 downregulates CNTNAP2, a member of the neurexin family found in neurons. CNTNAP2 is associated with common forms of language impairment.

FOXP2 also downregulates SRPX2, the 'Sushi Repeat-containing Protein X-linked 2'. It directly reduces its expression, by binding to its gene's promoter. SRPX2 is involved in glutamatergic synapse formation in the cerebral cortex and is more highly expressed in childhood. SRPX2 appears to specifically increase the number of glutamatergic synapses in the brain, while leaving inhibitory GABAergic synapses unchanged and not affecting dendritic spine length or shape. On the other hand, FOXP2's activity does reduce dendritic spine length and shape, in addition to number, indicating it has other regulatory roles in dendritic morphology.

== In other animals ==
=== Chimpanzees ===
In chimpanzees, FOXP2 differs from the human version by two amino acids. A study in Germany sequenced FOXP2's complementary DNA in chimps and other species to compare it with human complementary DNA in order to find the specific changes in the sequence. FOXP2 was found to be functionally different in humans compared to chimps. Since FOXP2 was also found to have an effect on other genes, its effects on other genes is also being studied. Researchers deduced that there could also be further clinical applications in the direction of these studies in regards to illnesses that show effects on human language ability.

=== Mice ===
In a mouse FOXP2 gene knockouts, loss of both copies of the gene causes severe motor impairment related to cerebellar abnormalities and lack of ultrasonic vocalisations normally elicited when pups are removed from their mothers. These vocalizations have important communicative roles in mother–offspring interactions. Loss of one copy was associated with impairment of ultrasonic vocalisations and a modest developmental delay. Male mice on encountering female mice produce complex ultrasonic vocalisations that have characteristics of song. Mice that have the R552H point mutation carried by the KE family show cerebellar reduction and abnormal synaptic plasticity in striatal and cerebellar circuits.

Humanized FOXP2 mice display altered cortico-basal ganglia circuits. The human allele of the FOXP2 gene was transferred into the mouse embryos through homologous recombination to create humanized FOXP2 mice. The human variant of FOXP2 also had an effect on the exploratory behavior of the mice. In comparison to knockout mice with one non-functional copy of FOXP2, the humanized mouse model showed opposite effects when testing its effect on the levels of dopamine, plasticity of synapses, patterns of expression in the striatum and behavior that was exploratory in nature.

When FOXP2 expression was altered in mice, it affected many different processes including the learning motor skills and the plasticity of synapses. Additionally, FOXP2 is found more in the sixth layer of the cortex than in the fifth, and this is consistent with it having greater roles in sensory integration. FOXP2 was also found in the medial geniculate nucleus of the mouse brain, which is the processing area that auditory inputs must go through in the thalamus. It was found that its mutations play a role in delaying the development of language learning. It was also found to be highly expressed in the Purkinje cells and cerebellar nuclei of the cortico-cerebellar circuits. High FOXP2 expression has also been shown in the spiny neurons that express type 1 dopamine receptors in the striatum, substantia nigra, subthalamic nucleus and ventral tegmental area. The negative effects of the mutations of FOXP2 in these brain regions on motor abilities were shown in mice through tasks in lab studies. When analyzing the brain circuitry in these cases, scientists found greater levels of dopamine and decreased lengths of dendrites, which caused defects in long-term depression, which is implicated in motor function learning and maintenance. Through EEG studies, it was also found that these mice had increased levels of activity in their striatum, which contributed to these results. There is further evidence for mutations of targets of the FOXP2 gene shown to have roles in schizophrenia, epilepsy, autism, bipolar disorder and intellectual disabilities.

=== Bats ===
FOXP2 has implications in the development of bat echolocation. Contrary to apes and mice, FOXP2 is extremely diverse in echolocating bats. Twenty-two sequences of non-bat eutherian mammals revealed a total number of 20 nonsynonymous mutations in contrast to half that number of bat sequences, which showed 44 nonsynonymous mutations. All cetaceans share three amino acid substitutions, but no differences were found between echolocating toothed whales and non-echolocating baleen cetaceans. Within bats, however, amino acid variation correlated with different echolocating types. There is also evidence of ongoing intraspecific selection in at least one species of bat, in response to environmental changes.

=== Birds ===
In songbirds, FOXP2 most likely regulates genes involved in neuroplasticity. Gene knockdown of FOXP2 in area X of the basal ganglia in songbirds results in incomplete and inaccurate song imitation. Overexpression of FOXP2 was accomplished through injection of adeno-associated virus serotype 1 (AAV1) into area X of the brain. This overexpression produced similar effects to that of knockdown; juvenile zebra finch birds were unable to accurately imitate their tutors. Similarly, in adult canaries, higher FOXP2 levels also correlate with song changes.

Levels of FOXP2 in adult zebra finches are significantly higher when males direct their song to females than when they sing song in other contexts. "Directed" singing refers to when a male is singing to a female usually for a courtship display. "Undirected" singing occurs when for example, a male sings when other males are present or is alone. Studies have found that FOXP2 levels vary depending on the social context. When the birds were singing undirected song, there was a decrease of FOXP2 expression in Area X. This downregulation was not observed and FOXP2 levels remained stable in birds singing directed song.

Differences between song-learning and non-song-learning birds have been shown to be caused by differences in FOXP2 gene expression, rather than differences in the amino acid sequence of the FOXP2 protein.

=== Zebrafish ===
In zebrafish, FOXP2 is expressed in the ventral and dorsal thalamus, telencephalon, diencephalon where it likely plays a role in nervous system development. The zebrafish FOXP2 gene has an 85% similarity to the human FOX2P ortholog.

== History ==
FOXP2 and its gene were discovered as a result of investigations on an English family known as the KE family, half of whom (15 individuals across three generations) had a speech and language disorder called developmental verbal dyspraxia. Their case was studied at the Institute of Child Health of University College London. In 1990, Myrna Gopnik, Professor of Linguistics at McGill University, reported that the disorder-affected KE family had severe speech impediment with incomprehensible talk, largely characterized by grammatical deficits. She hypothesized that the basis was not of learning or cognitive disability, but due to genetic factors affecting mainly grammatical ability. (Her hypothesis led to a popularised existence of "grammar gene" and a controversial notion of grammar-specific disorder.) In 1995, the University of Oxford and the Institute of Child Health researchers found that the disorder was purely genetic. Remarkably, the inheritance of the disorder from one generation to the next was consistent with autosomal dominant inheritance, i.e., mutation of only a single gene on an autosome (non-sex chromosome) acting in a dominant fashion. This is one of the few known examples of Mendelian (monogenic) inheritance for a disorder affecting speech and language skills, which typically have a complex basis involving multiple genetic risk factors.

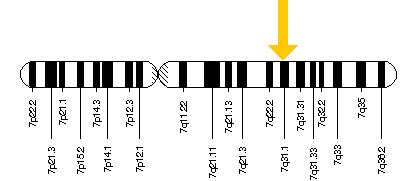
The FOXP2 gene is located on the long (q) arm of chromosome 7, at position 31.

In 1998, Oxford University geneticists Simon Fisher, Anthony Monaco, Cecilia S. L. Lai, Jane A. Hurst, and Faraneh Vargha-Khadem identified an autosomal dominant monogenic inheritance that is localized on a small region of chromosome 7 from DNA samples taken from the affected and unaffected members. The chromosomal region (locus) contained 70 genes. The locus was given the official name "SPCH1" (for speech-and-language-disorder-1) by the Human Genome Nomenclature committee. Mapping and sequencing of the chromosomal region was performed with the aid of bacterial artificial chromosome clones. Around this time, the researchers identified an individual who was unrelated to the KE family but had a similar type of speech and language disorder. In this case, the child, known as CS, carried a chromosomal rearrangement (a translocation) in which part of chromosome 7 had become exchanged with part of chromosome 5. The site of breakage of chromosome 7 was located within the SPCH1 region.

In 2001, the team identified in CS that the mutation is in the middle of a protein-coding gene. Using a combination of bioinformatics and RNA analyses, they discovered that the gene codes for a novel protein belonging to the forkhead-box (FOX) group of transcription factors. As such, it was assigned with the official name of FOXP2. When the researchers sequenced the FOXP2 gene in the KE family, they found a heterozygous point mutation shared by all the affected individuals, but not in unaffected members of the family and other people. This mutation is due to an amino-acid substitution that inhibits the DNA-binding domain of the FOXP2 protein. Further screening of the gene identified multiple additional cases of FOXP2 disruption, including different point mutations and chromosomal rearrangements, providing evidence that damage to one copy of this gene is sufficient to derail speech and language development.

== See also ==
- Chimpanzee genome project
- Evolutionary linguistics
- FOX proteins
- Olduvai domain
- Origin of language
- Vocal learning
