= Michael Corballis =

New Zealand psychologist and author (1936–2021)

Michael Corballis ONZM
- Born: Michael Charles Corballis; 10 September 1936; Marton, New Zealand
- Died: 13 November 2021 (aged 85)
- Education: McGill University
- Spouse: Barbara Elizabeth Wheeler (m. 1962; died 2020)
- Children: 2
- Scientific career
- Fields: Cognitive neuroscience
- Workplaces: McGill University; University of Auckland
- Thesis: Rehearsal and decay in short-term serial recall (1965)
- Doctoral advisor: Dalbir Bindra
- Doctoral students: Jenni Ogden
- Other notable students: Faraneh Vargha-Khadem

Michael Charles Corballis ONZM (10 September 1936 – 13 November 2021) was a New Zealand and Canadian psychologist and author. He was Emeritus Professor at the Department of Psychology at the University of Auckland. His fields of research were cognitive psychology and cognitive neuroscience, encompassing visual perception, visual imagery, attention, memory, and the evolution of language.

== Early life and family ==
Corballis was born in the farming district of Marton, New Zealand, in 1936, the eldest of four sons of sheep farmers Philip Patrick Joseph Corballis and Alice Elizabeth Harris. In 1962, Corballis married Barbara Elizabeth Wheeler. They had two sons: Paul, also a cognitive neuroscientist, and Tim, a novelist and academic. Barbara Corballis died in 2020.

== Education and career ==
Corballis received his high-school education as a boarder at Wanganui Collegiate School. He earned a Master's degree in Mathematics at the University of New Zealand in 1959 and a Master of Arts in psychology at the University of Auckland, New Zealand, in 1962. He then moved to McGill University in Montreal, Quebec, Canada, where he completed a PhD in psychology in 1965.

From 1966 to 1968, Corballis returned to University of Auckland as a lecturer (assistant professor). In 1968, he returned to McGill, first as an assistant professor of psychology, rising to full professor in 1975.

In 1978, Corballis was appointed professor of psychology at the University of Auckland. From 1993 to 2000, he was also Director of the Research Centre for Cognitive Neuroscience within the department. In 2008, Corballis became emeritus professor. In 2014, he became the university's Inaugural Creativity Fellow. Corballis remained active at the university until his death on 13 November 2021.

In July 2021, Corballis and six other University of Auckland professors wrote a controversial letter "In Defence of Science" to the New Zealand Listener magazine, in which they said that Māori knowledge should not be considered in the same category as science because of the former's spiritual content.

Notable students include Jenni Ogden and Faraneh Vargha-Khadem.

== Research ==
During Corballis's years at McGill, the main focus of his research was in cognitive neuroscience, analyzing complex cognitive systems such as perception, attention, and memory, and initiating a research program on cerebral asymmetry. He continued those research areas at University of Auckland. In the 21st century, Corballis's turned to evolutionary biology, contributing significantly to complex cognitive processes. Of great interest was his hypothesis that human language evolved from gestures, expressed in the book From hand to mouth; it received more than 1500 citations in its first year.

Over his career, Corballis published more than 400 scientific papers and book chapters, and 14 books. His work was cited more than 27,000 times, giving him a h-index of 77. Corballis supervised the work of at least 14 research assistants, graduate students, and postdoctoral fellows, who, in turn supervised more than 50 students and fellows, leaving a lasting human scientific legacy.

== Service ==
Corballis served in many roles that supported various academic pursuits.

In 2009, he was president of the International Neuropsychological Society.

Corballis edited the New Zealand Journal of Psychology from 1994 to 1997. He founded the journal Laterality in 1995 and co-edited it until 2008. He also was a member of numerous editorial boards and wrote numerous reviews of scientific manuscripts submitted to scores of journals, of which 137 are recorded in Publons.

Corballis chaired University of Auckland Review Committees, including the Department of Sociology (1992) and the Department of Engineering Science (2003). He also chaired or was a member of other universities' reviews, including University of Queensland, Victoria University of Wellington, University of Otago, and University of Canterbury. Corballis performed numerous administrative taks for the Royal Society of New Zealand and for the New Zealand Psychological Society.

Corballis served on various research granting and assessing bodies, including New Zealand's Marsden Fund, Health Research Council of New Zealand, Performance Based Research Fund, Australia's Australian Research Council, and Canada's National Research Council.

== Honours and awards ==
Corballis was elected a Fellow of the Royal Society of New Zealand in 1982. In 1999, Corballlis was awarded the Shorland Medal by the New Zealand Association of Scientists. The same year he was awarded a James Cook Research Fellowship for research into tracking brain activity. In the 2002 Queen's Birthday and Golden Jubilee Honours, he was appointed an Officer of the New Zealand Order of Merit, for services to psychological science. In 2016, he received the Royal Society of New Zealand's Rutherford Medal.

== Death ==
Corballis died in November 2021, after a short period of cancer. Among those who paid tribute to him was the Harvard professor Steven Pinker, who described his "beloved former professor" as having done "brilliant work on handedness, mental rotation," and the evolution of language. He further described Corballis as "urbane, charming, witty, irreverent."

== Publications ==
=== Books ===
1. Psychology of Left and Right with Ivan L. Beal. John Wiley & Sons (1976)
2. The Ambivalent Mind: The Neuropsychology of Left and Right with Ivan L. Beale. Nelson-Hall (1983)
3. Human Laterality, Academic Press (1984)
4. Memory Mechanisms: A Tribute to Graham Goddard with Cliff Abraham and Geoff White (Editors). Lawrence Erlbaum Associates (1991)
5. The Lopsided Ape: Evolution of the Generative Mind. Oxford University Press (1991)
6. The Descent of Mind with S. E. G. Lea (Editors). Oxford University Press (1999)
7. Twin Lateralisation with C. McManus and M. Peters (Editors). Psychology Press (1999)
8. From Hand to Mouth: The Origins of Language. University Press Group (2003)
9. The Recursive Mind: The Origins of Human Language, Thought, and Civilization. Princeton University Press (2011)
10. Pieces of Mind: 21 Short Walks Around the Human Brain. Auckland University Press (2011). Republished as A Very Short Tour of the Mind. The Overlook Press, USA (2013)
11. The Wandering Mind: What the Brain Does When You're Not Looking Auckland University Press (2014)
12. How a Distinguished Scholar was Driven to Kill Herself: The Dark Side of Science. The Edwin Mellen Press (2016)
13. The Truth about Language: What It Is and Where It Came From. University of Chicago Press (2017)
14. Adventures of a Psychologist: Reflections on What Made Up the Mind. Routledge (2020)

=== Selected journal papers ===
- Suddendorf, T.; Corballis, M. C. (1997). "Mental time travel and the evolution of the human mind". Genetic, Social, and General Psychology Monographs. 123 (2): 133–167. PMID 9204544.
- Suddendorf, T.; Corballis, M. C. (2007). "The evolution of foresight: What is mental time travel, and is it unique to humans?". Behavioral and Brain Sciences. 30 (3): 299–313. doi:10.1017/S0140525X07001975. PMID 17963565.
- Corballis, M. C. (2009). "The evolution and genetics of cerebral asymmetry". Philosophical Transactions of the Royal Society of London, B: Biological Sciences, 364, 867–879. doi:10.1098/rstb.2008.0232
- Lewald, J., Peters, S., Corballis, M. C., & Hausmann, M. (2009). "Perception of stationary and moving sound following cortectomy". Neuropsychologia, 47, 962–971. doi:10.1016/j.neuropsychologia.2008.10.016
- Milivojevic, B., Hamm, J. P., & Corballis, M. C. (2009). "Functional neuroanatomy of mental rotation". Journal of Cognitive Neuroscience, 21, 945–959. doi:10.1162/jocn.2009.21085
- Corballis, M. C. (2009). "The evolution of language". Annals of the New York Academy of Sciences, 1156, 19–43. doi:10.1111/j.1749-6632.2009.04423.x
- Suddendorf, T., Addis, D. R., & Corballis, M. C. (2009). "Mental time travel and the shaping of the human mind". Philosophical Transactions of the Royal Society of London, B: Biological Sciences, 364, 1317–1324. doi:10.1098/rstb.2008.0301

=== More classic & recent journal papers ===
- 245 citations (Semantic Scholar/DOI) [2022-07-25]. Corballis, Michael C. (1989). Laterality and human evolution. Psychological Review, 96(3), 492–505. https://doi.org/10.1037/0033-295X.96.3.492
- 215 citations (Semantic Scholar/DOI) [2022-07-25]. Corballis, Michael C. (1997). The genetics and evolution of handedness. Psychological Review, 104(4), 714–727. https://doi.org/10.1037/0033-295X.104.4.714
- 173 citations (Semantic Scholar/DOI) [2022-07-25]. Corballis, Michael C. (2014). Left Brain, Right Brain: Facts and Fantasies. PLoS Biology, 12(1). https://doi.org/10.1371/journal.pbio.1001767
- 172 citations (Semantic Scholar/DOI) [2022-07-25]. Corballis, Michael C. (1980). Laterality and myth. American Psychologist, 35(3), 284–295. https://doi.org/10.1037/0003-066X.35.3.284
- 55 citations (Semantic Scholar/DOI) [2022-07-25]. Corballis, Michael C., Hattie, J., & Fletcher, R. (2008). Handedness and intellectual achievement: An even-handed look. Neuropsychologia, 46(1), 374–378. https://doi.org/10.1016/j.neuropsychologia.2007.09.009
- 49 citations (Semantic Scholar/DOI) [2022-07-25]. Corballis, M C, & Häberling, I. S. (2015). Complementarity or independence of hemispheric specializations? A brief review. Neuropsychologia, (October 2017). https://doi.org/10.1016/j.neuropsychologia.2015.12.018
- 26 citations (Semantic Scholar/DOI) [2022-07-25]. Corballis, Michael C. (2015). What's left in language? Beyond the classical model. Annals of the New York Academy of Sciences. https://doi.org/10.1111/nyas.12761
- 4 citations (Semantic Scholar/DOI) [2022-07-25]. Corballis, Michael C. (2021). How Asymmetries Evolved: Hearts, Brains, and Molecules. Symmetry, (6), 914. https://doi.org/10.3390/sym13060914
