= Giorgio Vallortigara =

Italian neuroscientist (born 1959)

- Born: 6 August 1959 (age 67); Rovereto
- Education: University of Padua
- Scientific career
- Fields: Neuroscience; Animal Behaviour; Physiology; Ethology

Giorgio Vallortigara is an Italian neuroscientist.

== Biography ==
In 1983 he graduated in experimental psychology from the University of Padua, where he also obtained his research doctorate in 1990. In 1991, he moved to the University of Sussex, with a post-doctoral scholarship, where he found cerebral lateralization in lower vertebrates, such as fish and amphibians. Many of his articles have been published in Nature, Science, Current Biology, and PNAS.

He was the scientific director of the Interdepartmental Center for Mind and Brain (CIMEC) in Trento, until the first half of 2015.

In 2013, he was awarded the Ferrari Soave Award with the following citation: "The main scientific interests of Prof. Giorgio Vallortigara concern the analysis of spatial cognition in birds and the mechanisms underlying their geometric representation. He is particularly interested in the numerical cognition and the biological predisposition to the recognition of animated agents in various animal models. In these fields he has made original and innovative contributions of great international relevance."

In 2016 he received the award for ethology Prix Geoffroy Saint Hilaire of the French Society for the Study of Animal Behavior and an honorary degree from the Ruhr University in Bochum, Germany.

In 2025 he published his first novel (Desiderare, Marsilio Editore)

== Selected publications ==
=== Books ===
- Cervello di gallina. Visite guidate tra etologia e neuroscienze (Hen's brain. Guided tours between ethology and neuroscience), ed. Bollati Boringhieri, Torino, 2005
- Nati per credere (Born to believe), with V. Girotto & T. Pievani, ed. Codice, Torino, 2008
- La mente che scodinzola (The mind that wags its tail), ed. Mondadori, Milano, 2011
- Divided Brains. The Biology and Behaviour of Brain Asymmetries, with L.J. Rogers & R.J. Andrew, Cambridge University Press, New York, 2013
- Cervelli che contano (Brains that count), with Nicla Pancera, ed. Adelphi, 2014
- Piccoli equivoci tra noi animali (Small misunderstandings between us animals), with Lisa Vozza, ed. Zanichelli, 2015
- Pensieri della mosca con la testa storta (The fly's thoughts with the crooked mind), ed. Adelphi, Milano, 2021
- "The Origins of Consciousness.Thoughts of the Crooked-Headed Fly". Routledge, London, 2024.
- "Born Knowing. Imprinting and the Origins of Knowledge". MIT Press, Cambridge, Ma, 2021
- "A spasso con il cane Luna". Adelphi, Milano, 2025
- "Desiderare". Marsilio, Venezia, 2025

=== Journal articles (selection) ===
Messina, A., Potrich, D., Schiona, I., Sovrano, V.A., Fraser, S.E., Brennan, C.H., Vallortigara, G. (2021). Neurons in the dorso-central division of zebrafish pallium respond to change in visual numerosity. Cerebral Cortex, bhab218, https://doi.org/10.1093/cercor/bhab218

Lorenzi, E., Perrino, M., Vallortigara, G. (2021). Numerosities and other magnitudes in the brains: A comparative view. Frontiers in Psychology - Cognition, 12:641994. doi: 10.3389/fpsyg.2021.641994

Vallortigara, G. (2021). The rose and the fly. A conjecture on the origin of consciousness. Biochemical and Biophysical Research Communications, 564: 170-174. doi: 10.1016/j.bbrc.2020.11.005.

Bortot, M., Stancher, G., Vallortigara, G. (2020). Transfer from number to size reveals abstract coding of magnitude in honeybees. iScience, 23: 101122 https://doi.org/10.1016/ j.isci.2020.101122

Vallortigara, G., Rogers, L.J. (2020). A function for the bicameral mind. Cortex, 124: 274-285. doi: 10.1016/j.cortex.2019.11.018

Hebert, M., Versace, E., Vallortigara, G. (2019). Inexperienced preys know when to flee or to freeze in front of a threat. Proceedings of the National Academy of Sciences USA,116: 22918-22920.

Vallortigara, G. (2019). Q & A Giorgio Vallortigara. Current Biology, R606-R608, July 8 2019.

Buiatti, M., Di Giorgio, E., Piazza, M., Polloni, C., Menna, G., Taddei, F., Baldo, E., Vallortigara, G. (2019). A cortical route for face-like pattern processing in human newborns. Proceedings of the National Academy of Sciences USA, 116: 4625-4630.

Schnell, A.K., Bellanger, C., Vallortigara, G., Jozet-Alves, C. (2018). Visual asymmetries in cuttlefish during brightness matching for camouflage. Current Biology, 28: 925-926.

Versace, E., Martinho-Truswel, A., Kacelnik, A., Vallortigara, G. (2018). Priors in animal and artificial intelligence: Where does learning begin? Trends in Cognitive Sciences, 22: 963-965.

Vallortigara, G. (2018). Comparative cognition of number and space: The case of geometry and of the mental number line. Philosophical Transactions of the Royal Society B, DOI: 10.1098/rstb.2015.0615.

Rosa-Salva, O., Hernik, M., Broseghini, A., Vallortigara, G. (2018). Visually-naïve chicks prefer agents that move as if constrained by a bilateral body-plan. Cognition, 173: 106-114.

Rugani, R., Vallortigara, G., Priftis, K., Regolin, L. (2015). Number-space mapping in the newborn chick resembles humans’ mental number line. Science, 347: 534-536.

Fontanari, L., Gonzalez, M., Vallortigara, G., Girotto, V. (2014). Probabilistic cognition in two Maya indigenous groups. Proceedings of the National Academy of Sciences USA, 111: 17075-17080.
