= Simon Fisher =

British geneticist and neuroscientist (born 1970)

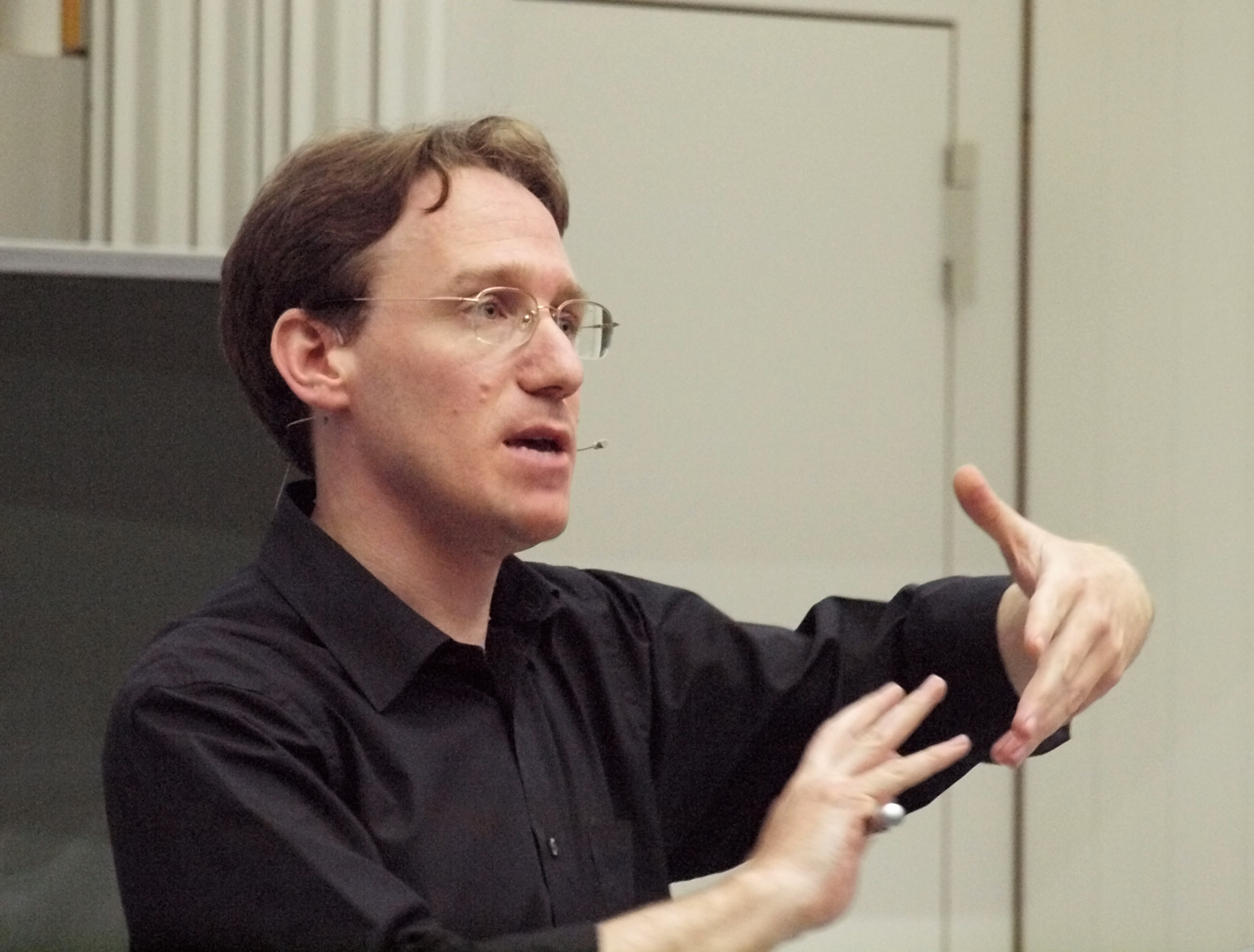
- Fisher in 2010
- Born: Simon E. Fisher; 19 August 1970 (age 56)
- Education: University of Cambridge (BA); University of Oxford (DPhil)
- Awards: Crick Lecture (2008)
- Scientific career
- Fields: Genetics; Genomics; Speech; Language; FOXP2
- Thesis: Positional cloning of the gene responsible for dent's disease (1995)
- Doctoral advisor: Ian W. Craig
- Other academic advisors: Anthony Monaco
- Doctoral students: Sonja Vernes
- Website: www.mpi.nl/people/fisher-simon-e

Simon E. Fisher (born 1970) is a British geneticist and neuroscientist who has pioneered research into the genetic basis of human speech and language. He is a director of the Max Planck Institute for Psycholinguistics and Professor of language and genetics at the Donders Institute for Brain, Cognition and Behaviour in Nijmegen, The Netherlands.

== Education ==
Fisher was an undergraduate student at Trinity Hall, Cambridge where he read Natural Sciences. He was a postgraduate student at St. Catherine's College, Oxford where he was awarded a Doctor of Philosophy degree from the University of Oxford in 1995 for research on positional cloning of the gene responsible for Dent's disease supervised by Ian W. Craig.

== Career and research ==
Following his DPhil, he was a postdoctoral researcher in Anthony Monaco's laboratory at the Wellcome Trust Centre for Human Genetics in Oxford.

Fisher is the co-discoverer of FOXP2, the first gene to be implicated in a human speech and language disorder. His subsequent research has used FOXP2 and other language-related genes as molecular windows into neural pathways critical for language.

=== Awards and honours ===
Awards and prizes in recognition of his work include the Francis Crick Lecture in 2008 and the inaugural Eric Kandel Young Neuroscientists Prize in 2009.
