= Jane Koomar =

American educator (1954–2013)

- Born: 1954; Lakewood, Ohio, U.S.
- Died: February 24, 2013 (aged 58–59)
- Education: Ohio State University; Boston University
- Occupation: Occupational therapist
- Years active: 1983–2013
- Spouse: John Laferriere

Jane Audry Koomar (1954 – February 24, 2013) was an American scholar, educator, occupational therapist, developmental psychologist and author. She co-founded OTA–Watertown, an occupational therapy-focused organization, in 1983. Today, now known as OTA The Koomar Center, it is the world's largest organization of its kind.

She was president of both OTA–Watertown and its related endeavor, the SPIRAL Foundation.

Koomar also had over twenty works published, including Answers to Questions Teachers Ask About Sensory Integration.

== Early life and education ==
Koomar was born in Lakewood, Ohio, to Michael and Audry Koomar.

In her teenage years, she started a daycare-style babysitting service for families in her neighborhood.

Koomar received a bachelor's degree in occupational therapy from Ohio State University. This was followed by a master's degree and PhD in developmental psychology at Boston University. She was also an assistant professor in occupational therapy.

She also studied under Anna Jean Ayres and Ginny Scardinia.

== Career ==
Early in her career as a therapist, Koomar, who was a fellow of the American Occupational Therapy Association, worked on strategies to introduce sensory integration therapy into the public-school system of Cambridge, Massachusetts.

In 1983, she founded OTA–Watertown in a former school building on Washington Street in Watertown, Massachusetts. Today, it is the world's largest organization of its kind.

Koomar was Professor of Practice at Tufts University, in the Boston School of Occupational Therapy, during a one-year stint.

Shortly after Koomar's death, OTA–Watertown moved around 0.6 miles (0.97 km) west, to Bridge Street in Newton, Massachusetts, and was re-named OTA The Koomar Center in her honor. Sarah Sawyer became the new clinical director of the company.

== Personal life ==
Koomar married John Lafarriere, with whom she had a son and a daughter. The family lived in Bedford, Massachusetts.

== Death ==
Koomer died in 2013, having been diagnosed with breast cancer three years earlier.
