= Sensory room =

Sensory stimulation area for therapy

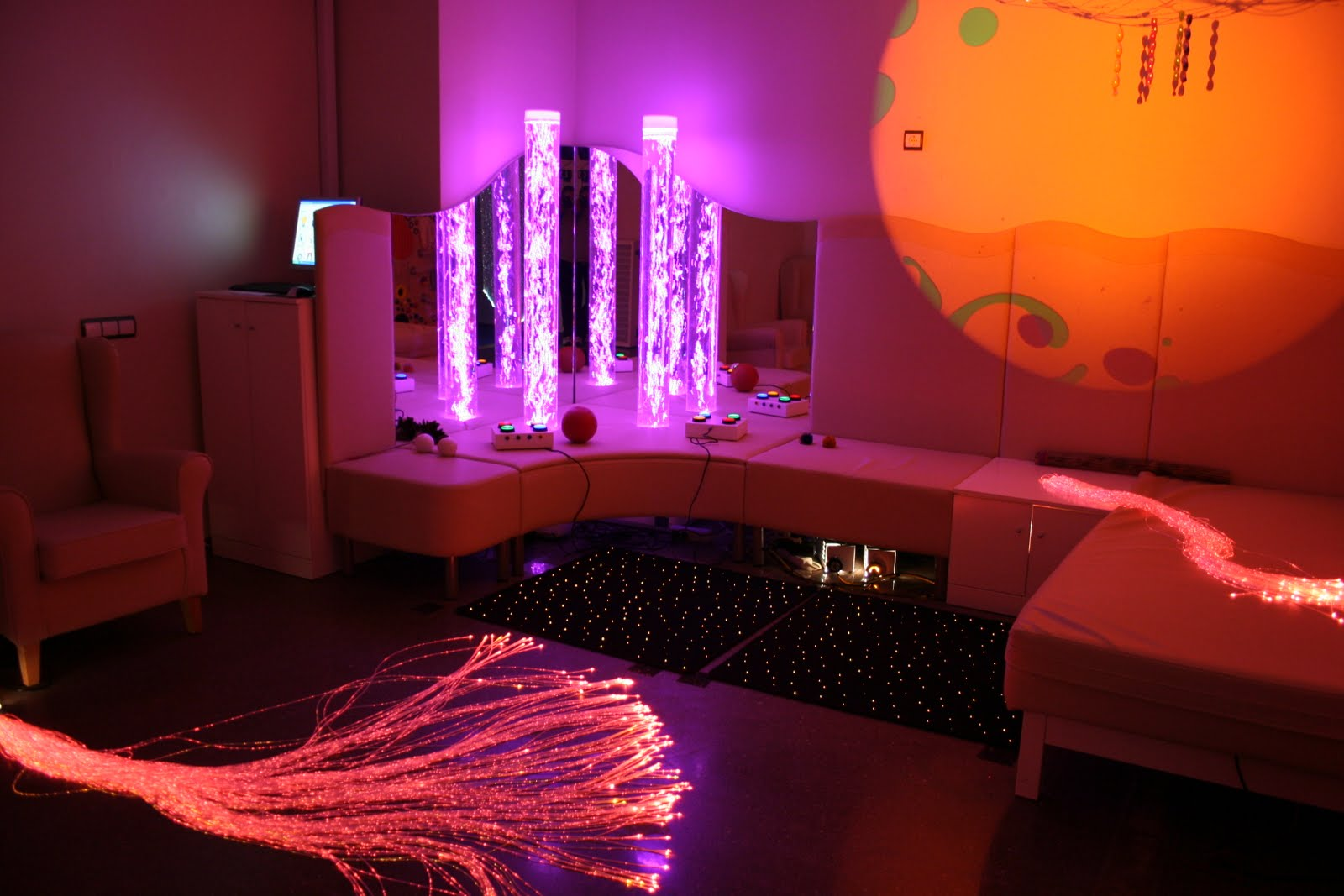
A multi-sensory room featuring interactive bubble tubes, fiber-optic lighting, and specialized ambient projections.

A sensory room is a special room designed to develop a person's sense, usually through special lighting, music, and objects. It can be used as a therapy for children who have special needs such as autism.

Sensory room is an umbrella term used to categorize a broad variety of therapeutic spaces specifically designed and utilized to promote self-organization and positive change. There are multiple types of sensory rooms and purposes for use that have been created and implemented in different practice areas to date. When used appropriately, sensory rooms:

- Help to create a safe space
- Facilitate the therapeutic alliance
- Provide opportunities for engagement in prevention and crisis de-escalation strategies, as well as a host of other therapeutic exchanges (to teach skills, offer a variety of therapeutic activities, etc.)
- Promote self-care/self-nurturance, resilience and recovery

== History ==
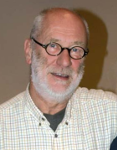
Ad Verheul

The history of the sensory room dates back to the Netherlands in the late 1970s and was invented by psychologists Ad Verheul and Jan Hulsegge. The original name for sensory rooms was snoezelen and originated from a fusion of the two Dutch words: snuffelen 'to sniff', and doezelen 'to doze, snooze'. Over time this term has evolved to sensory room, multi-sensory room, and multi-sensory environments (MSE). Originally, Verheul and Hulsegge worked together with individuals with severe disabilities in an institution. The idea behind the sensory room was to provide an environment in which an individual can be exposed to various different forms of stimuli to awaken and release sensory perception. The concept and usage of the sensory room has spread across Europe and the United States in the past fifty years to treat individuals with various different disabilities, disorders, and conditions.

== Equipment ==
Sensory rooms are often stocked full of many different types of equipment. This equipment is used to assist students in focusing on the present moment and to better process sensory information. Stocked equipment may be provided for balance and movement (trampolines, balance bars, swings), calming pressure (blankets, stuffed animals), or fidgeting behavior (fidget spinners, puzzles).

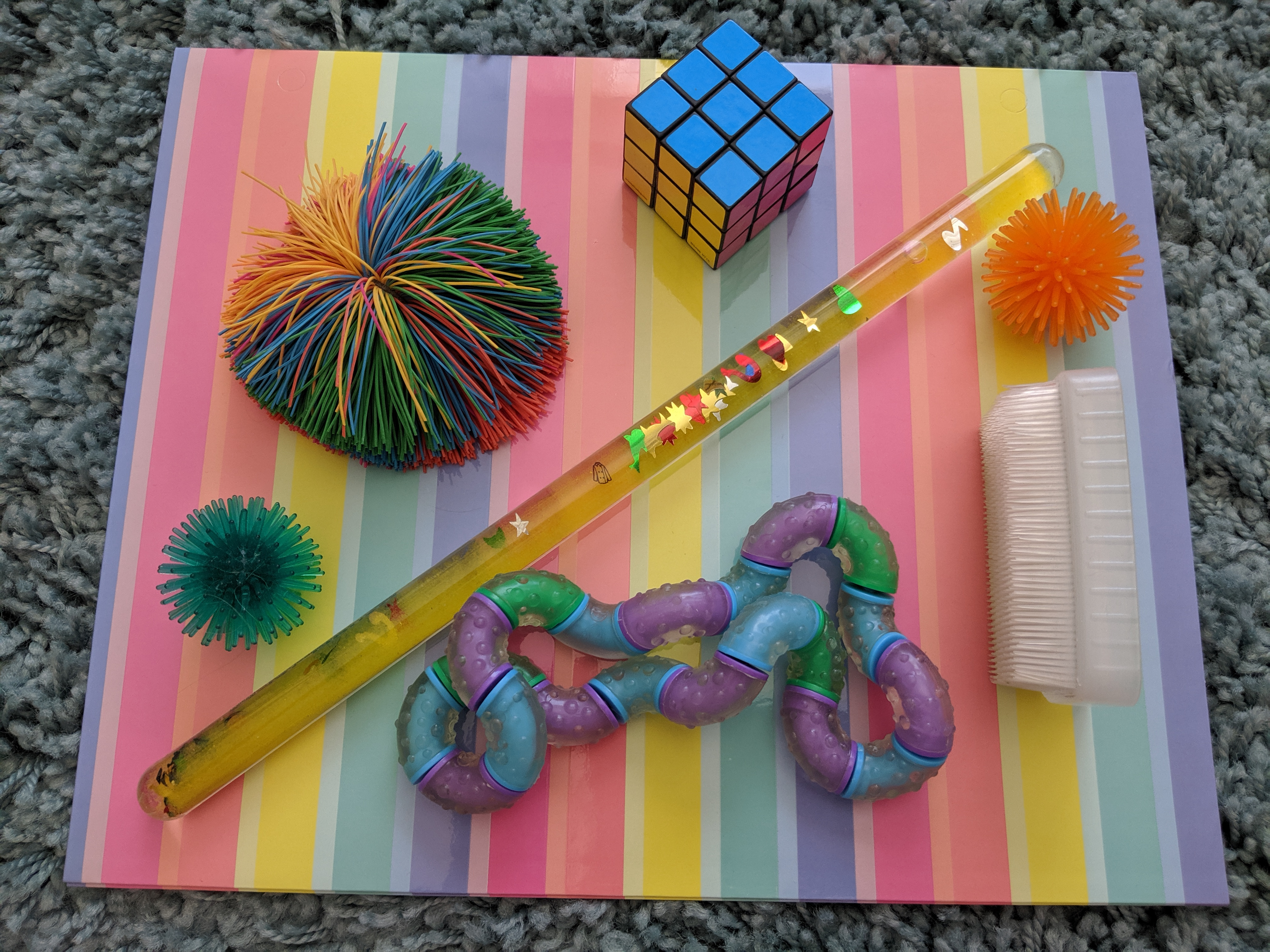
Sensory fidget equipment

Multi-sensory equipment is a vital and effective part in the treatment of sensory disorders with children and adults alike. Some examples include: projectors and effect wheels, bubble tubes, music equipment, fibre optics, vibrating devices, aroma diffusers and sound equipment. Many schools have "Sensory Kits" which are personalized items of sensory stimulating equipment that are meaningful to the owner. These kits are held in Sensory Rooms as bins, boxes, bags, etc. to be used for preventative purposes and for any crises that may occur. These kits are also used to help children create self-organization skills that can increase cognitive processes and future life skills.

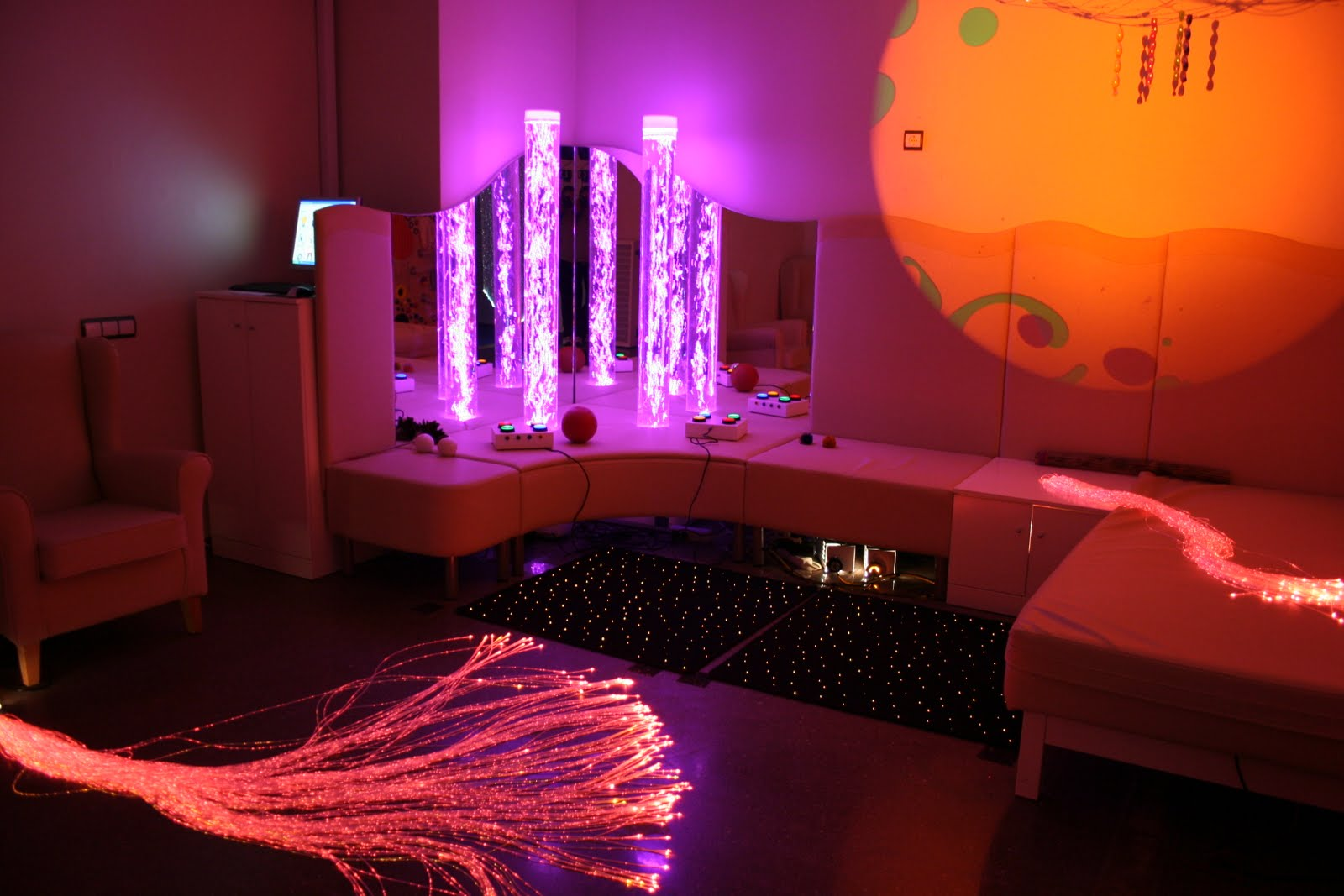
A multi-sensory room featuring interactive bubble tubes, fiber-optic lighting, and specialized ambient projections.

Sensory equipment can help develop key life skills including vocalization, gross motor skills, color recognition and tracking. Examples include sensory rooms, sensory pools, sensory bathrooms, and sensory gardens.

They are also sometimes called multi-sensory rooms, white rooms, or quiet rooms.

== Benefits ==
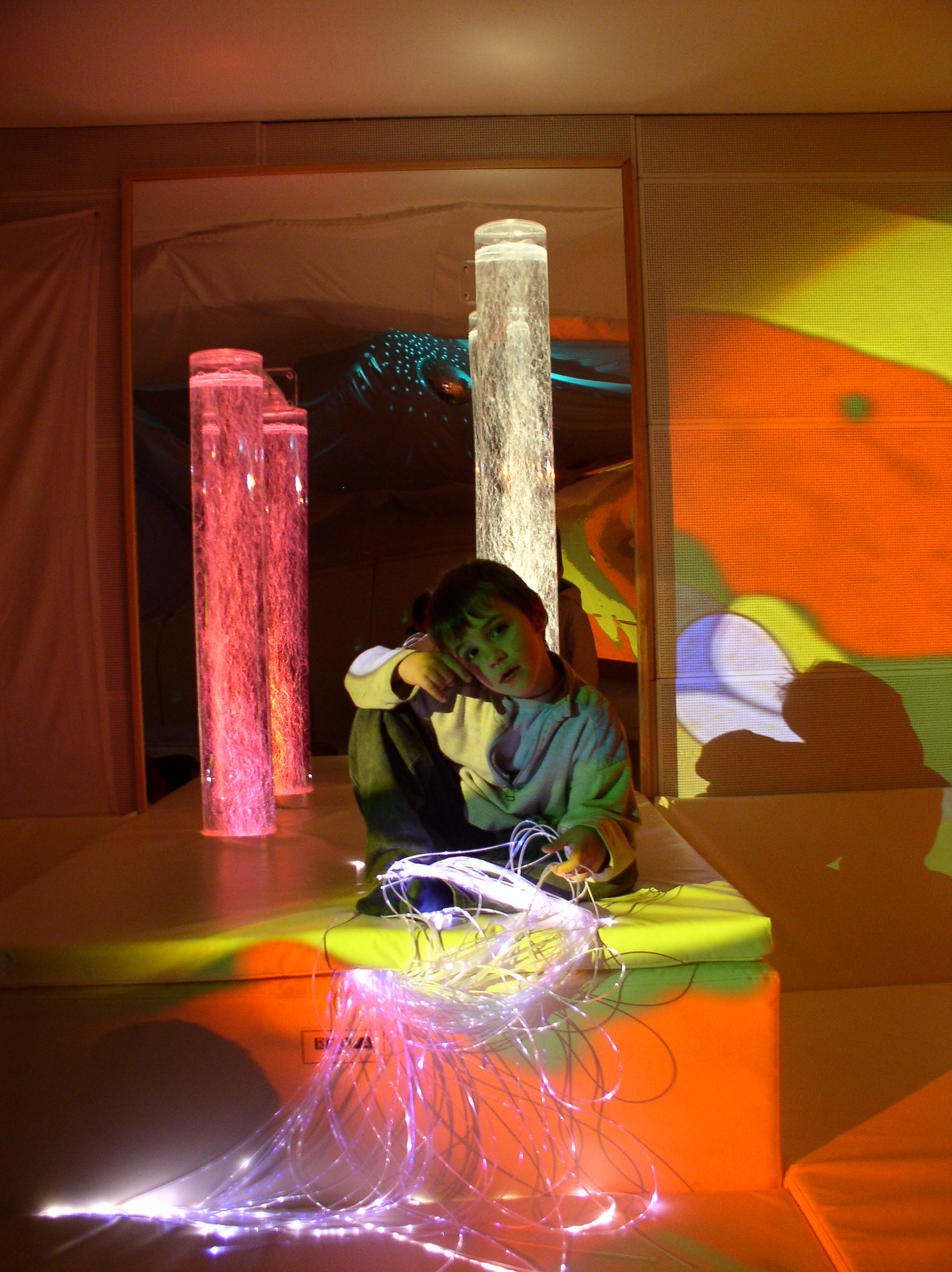
A child interacting with optical fibers and lighting in a multi-sensory room, showcasing the developmental and calming benefits of the environment.

The benefits of sensory rooms are multifaceted and have been shown to help individuals of all ages with varying levels of cognitive and physical abilities. There are many benefits of sensory rooms. One positive effect of sensory rooms is that they are an effective way for individuals to manage their stress levels.

Other benefits include: improving focus, encouraging communication and socialization, improving balance and motor planning, encouraging sensory exploration, promoting sensory integration, and enabling calmness and helping to improve self-regulation.

Sensory rooms are beneficial in public and private settings. They are often used in pediatric clinics and schools, hospitals and nursing homes, and individual family homes.

They have also been shown to reduce to negative thoughts and help with emotions. Sensory rooms can be beneficial for those that have a history of aggression, because they can be useful in de-escalating aggressive behavior. Adults that have an intellectual disability can use multi-sensory environments to allow emotional exploration and the chance to seek different kinds of stimulation, which can possibly be therapeutic. Relaxation is an important aspect of sensory rooms, and the different variables of multi-sensory rooms can possibly help reduce different kinds of problem behavior in patients. Hospice care patients can benefit from using sensory environments because they can enhance their end-of-life experience. These environments introduce a variety of new and familiar routines that include the eight different senses.

== Dementia ==
One way sensory rooms are being utilized is with patients with dementia. Sensory information is helpful in improving the quality of life for people who have dementia and potentially other memory problems. A recent study testing various forms of multi-sensory therapies found that there were positive effects for those with issues with agitation. They were able to help reduce agitation but there was no deeper healing from having dementia patients spend time in a sensory room. Not all studies were in support of using sensory rooms for those with dementia. Another study found that the use of sensory rooms was not able to bridge the gap between academic information and implementation of new information. This impacted the view of nursing home staff and they became reluctant to let the residents use them.

== See also ==
- Sensory friendly
- Snoezelen
