= KultureCity =

Organization assisting those with sensory processing disorders

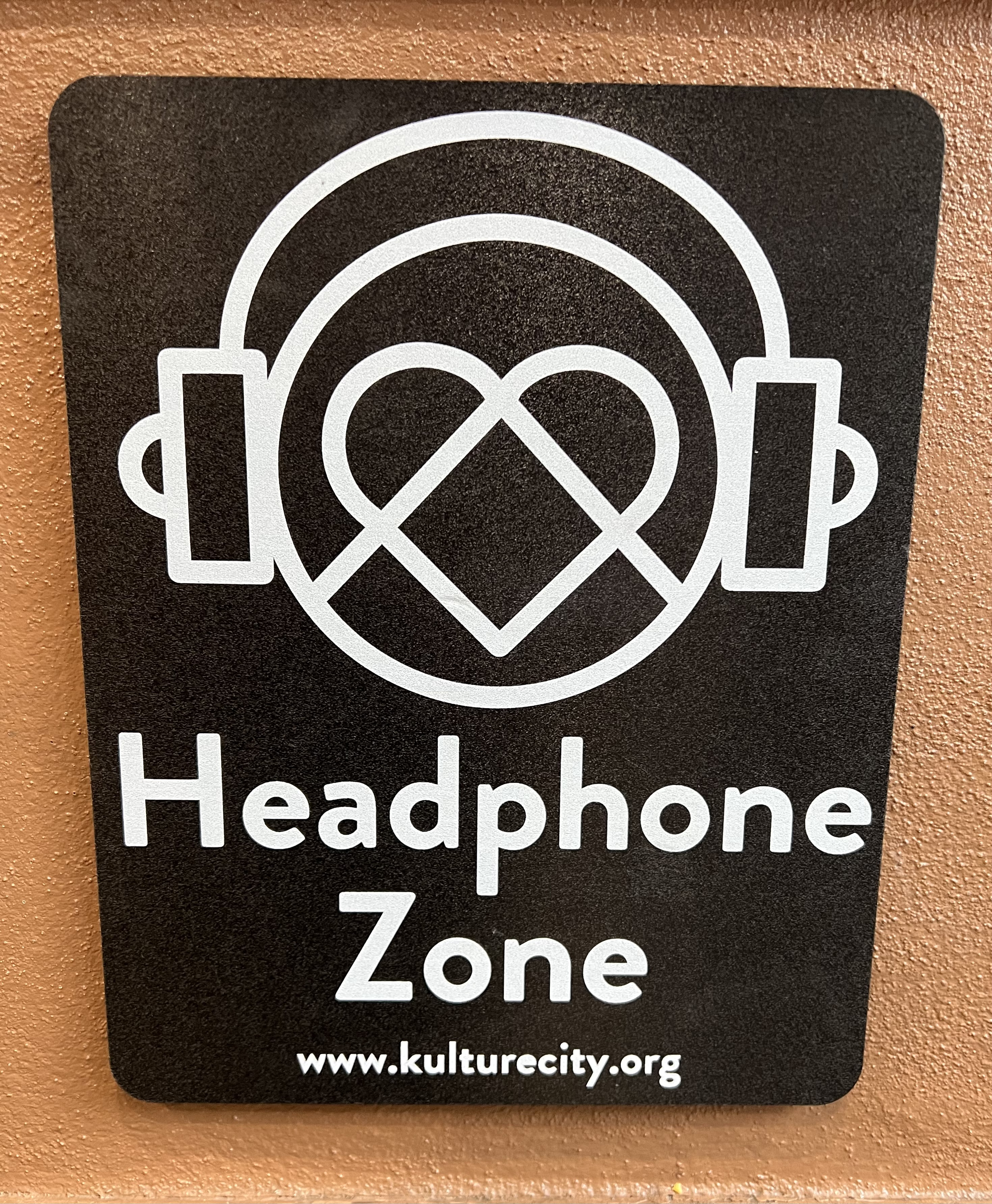
- KultureCity venue sign advising those with sensory processing disorders that they may need to wear noise cancelling headphones
- Formation: 2013
- Founder: Julian Maha, Michelle Kong
- Type: Nonprofit
- Location: Birmingham, Alabama, United States
- Coordinates: 33.428056°N 86.794444°W
- Region served: United States
- Products: Sensory inclusion certification, software application, sensory inclusion training
- Services: Training, certification
- Fields: Psychology, sensory processing disorder
- Revenue: $1,264,448 (2019)
- Website: kulturecity.org

KultureCity is an American nonprofit organization which trains staff at venues and certifies venues which have sensory inclusive modifications. It also provides an application for Apple and Android devices which lists sensory friendly venues to assist those with sensory processing disorders.

== Background ==
KultureCity is a nonprofit organization which directs users of their app to sensory-friendly accommodations at more than 900 different venues in the United States. The app is designed to assist guests with autism and other sensory processing disorders in finding sensory friendly locations. The organization provided sensory kits for venues of the 2026 FIFA World Cup.

== Certification ==
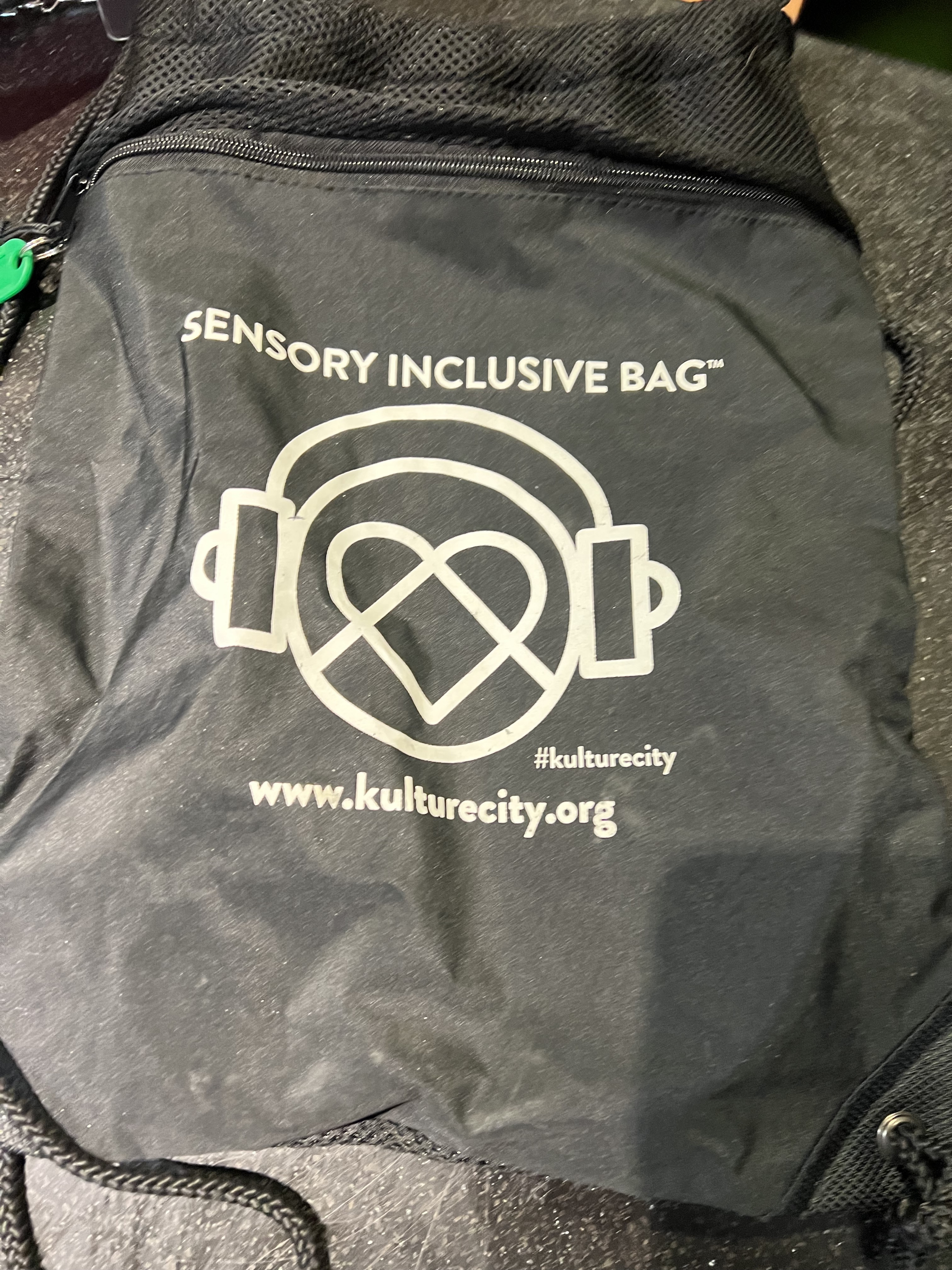
Sensory inclusive bag for people with sensory processing disorders

KultureCity partners with venues to provide training and tools to venues and events. The "Sensory Inclusion Certification" process involves training of venue staff by medical professionals regarding how to recognize those guests with sensory needs. Accommodations are meant to serve those with autism, dementia, and PTSD. The organization also trains and certifies police department personnel. They provide details of items which can be included in a special sensory bag which can be made available to those with sensory sensitivities. The items in the bag may include fidget items, noise canceling headphones, verbal cue cards and weighted lap pads.

By 2020, certified venues included professional sports arenas, stadiums, and zoos across the United States.

== Awards ==
In 2014 and 2015 Guidestar named KultureCity as Best National Non-Profit. In 2015 Microsoft Corporation selected KultureCity as a nonprofit partner and awarded a $50,000 grant.

== See also ==
- Autism friendly
- Buy Quiet
