= Sensory integration therapy =

Therapy designed to treat sensory processing disorder

Sensory integration therapy (SIT) was developed in the 1970s to treat children with sensory processing disorder, sometimes called sensory integrative dysfunction. Sensory integration therapy is based on A. Jean Ayres's Sensory Integration Theory, which proposes that sensory processing is linked to emotional regulation, learning, behavior, and participation in daily life. Sensory integration is the process of organizing sensations from the body and environmental stimuli.

== Theoretical concepts ==
A. Jean Ayres, an occupational therapist, developed SIT in the 1970s. The theory describes the following:

- The neurological processing and integration of sensory information from the body and the environment contributes to emotional regulation, learning, behavior, and participation in daily life.
- Empirically derived disorders of sensory integration.
- Intervention approaches and strategies for sensory input.

Sensory integration theory is used to explain why individuals behave in particular ways, plan intervention to ameliorate particular difficulties, and predict how behavior will change as a result of intervention. Ayres defines sensory integration as the organization of an individual's senses for use. The brain's ability to organize sensations supports a person in moving, learning, and reacting appropriately to situations.

Individuals with sensory-processing difficulties often experience delayed or impeded typical behaviors and functioning as a result of interference in the neurological processing and integration of sensory inputs. Sensory dysfunction affects the neurological processing of sensory information and sensory systems, negatively impacting learning and development. Ayres Sensory Integration (ASI) highlights the critical influence that sensory processing has on a child's growth and development. It contributes to understanding how sensation affects learning, social-emotional development, and neurophysiological processes such as motor performance, attention, and arousal.

ASI has been studied by different professions at various levels. For example, occupational therapists and researchers have studied it as a foundation for occupational performance and participation, while psychologists have studied it at the cellular level as multisensory integration.

As an intervention approach, it is described as "a clinical frame of reference for the assessment and treatment of people who have functional disorders in sensory processing".

== Practice ==
Individuals with sensory processing disorder or sensory integrative dysfunction experience problems with their sensory systems, including the senses of touch, smell, hearing, taste, sight, body coordination, and movement against gravity. They might also experience difficulties with movement, coordination, and sensing where their body is in space, a sense known as proprioception. Each sensory system has specific receptors or cells within the body that deliver messages to the brain. These receptors are located in specific parts of the body: gustatory (taste; mouth), olfactory (smell; nose), visual (eye), auditory (ear), and vestibular (inner ear). Other receptors are distributed throughout the body: tactile (skin) and proprioception (muscles and joints).

Sensory integration therapy, also known as sensory-based treatments or interventions, is designed to provide sensory activities or experiences to help individuals respond better to environmental stimuli (i.e., sensory input). The main goal of sensory integration therapy is to improve internal sensory processing, improve self-regulation, develop adaptive functioning skills, and to help the child successfully participate in daily life experiences and activities. Sensory-based interventions or activities are structured and individualized to each child's needs. They range from passive activities (e.g., wearing a weighted vest or weighted blanket, receiving hugs, playing with shaving cream) to active activities (e.g., spinning around, jumping on a trampoline, running, climbing, walking on patterned blocks).

According to proponents of sensory integration therapy, sensory integrative dysfunction is a common disorder in individuals with neurological learning disabilities such as an autism spectrum disorder, attention deficit hyperactivity disorder, and sensory modulation dysfunction.

Occupational therapists are trained to practice Ayres Sensory Integration (ASI) or Occupational Therapy Sensory Integration (OT-SI). During sessions, activities are presented to both challenge capabilities and assist in regulating a child (Parham & Mailloux, 2015). Activities are often tailored to meet individual needs. The goal of these sessions is to assist a child in gaining competence in participating in everyday activities in settings such as school, home, and extra curricular activities. Active participation is emphasized to maximize gains and learning. Children who require more structure are given modified activities that continue to offer freedom of choice to foster self-direction (Parham & Mailloux,2015).

== Evidence and effectiveness ==
While sensory-based interventions are highly advocated for, there continues to be a lack of empirical support. There is disagreement over their therapeutic value, largely due to problems with methodology, confusion of terms, and conflation with similar and related approaches.

Ayres's theory of sensory integration is frequently critiqued. Emerging evidence with improved methodology, the development of a fidelity measure, and increasing focus of resources on areas of practice that might not typically attract medical research funding suggest that evidence for Ayres SI is now emerging. Many of the effects of sensory-based interventions are difficult to quantify and measure, which may contribute to the perception that there is limited evidence for it.

Hume and colleagues support the use of Ayres's Sensory Integration (ASI), making the case for why review of science and evidence should be ongoing.

The current report updates and extends the work on evidence-based focused intervention practices begun with an initial review of the literature from 1997 to 2007 (Odom et al. 2010a, b) and extended through a second report covering the literature from 1990 to 2011 (Wong et al. 2015). Extending this systematic review through 2017 added 567 articles. As the intervention literature has provided more empirical information and practices have evolved, some of the classifications required reconceptualization and revision of previous definitions. In an active research area, knowledge does not stand still, and identification of EBPs should be dynamic, reflecting the growth of knowledge across time (Biglan and Ogden 2019).

In their article, they state the importance of clearly defining what sensory integration therapy is and what it is not, helping to clarify and delineate the clinical practice reported in their article from other related approaches based on Ayres' SI theory.

Sensory Integration refers explicitly to the classical sensory integration model developed by Jean Ayres (2005) and not to a variety of interventions that address sensory issues but have been found to be unsupported (Case-Smith et al. 2015; Watling and Hauer 2015).

== History ==
In the 1950s, Anna Jean Ayres, an occupational therapist and psychologist, developed the theory and framework of sensory integration. Her book Sensory Integration and the Child, first published in the 1970s, was intended to help families, therapists, and educators of children with sensory-processing difficulties and sensory processing disorders better organize and improve self-regulation of bodily and environmental sensory inputs.

Ayres's approach has been widely adopted among therapy and educational professionals over the past several decades. It has also been met with some resistance within the occupational therapy profession and in other disciplines.

== See also ==
- Multisensory integration
- Music therapy
- Occupational science
- Occupational therapy
- Sensory processing
- Sensory overload
- Sensory Processing Disorder Foundation
