= Child psychopathology =

Study of mental disorders in children and adolescents

Child psychopathology refers to the scientific study of mental disorders in children and adolescents. Oppositional defiant disorder, attention-deficit hyperactivity disorder, and autism spectrum disorder are examples of psychopathology that are typically first diagnosed during childhood. Mental health providers who work with children and adolescents are informed by research in developmental psychology, clinical child psychology, and family systems. Lists of child and adult mental disorders can be found in the International Statistical Classification of Diseases and Related Health Problems, 10th Edition (ICD-10), published by the World Health Organization (WHO) and in the Diagnostic and Statistical Manual of Mental Disorders, Fifth Edition (DSM-5), published by the American Psychiatric Association (APA). In addition, the Diagnostic Classification of Mental Health and Developmental Disorders of Infancy and Early Childhood (DC: 0-3R) is used in assessing mental health and developmental disorders in children up to age five.

== Causes ==
The etiology of child psychopathology has many explanations which differ from case to case. Many psychopathological disorders in children involve genetic and physiological mechanisms, though there are still many without any physical grounds. It is absolutely imperative that multiple sources of data be gathered. Diagnosing the psychopathology of children is daunting. It is influenced by development and contest, in addition to the traditional sources. Interviews with parents about school, etc., are inadequate. Either reports from teachers or direct observation by the professional are critical. (author, Robert B. Bloom, Ph.D.) The disorders with physical or biological mechanisms are easier to diagnose in children and are often diagnosed earlier in childhood. As psychopathy exists on a spectrum, the initial indications of the disorder can differ greatly. Certain children may exhibit subtle indications as early as two or three years old, while in other children, symptoms may not come apparent unit later in life. It's also possible for signs to manifest before the age of two in some cases. However, there are some disorders, no matter the mechanisms, that are not identified until adulthood. There is also reason to believe that there is co-morbidity of disorders, in that if one disorder is present, there is often another.

== Stress ==
Emotional stress or trauma in the parent-child relationship tends to be a cause of child psychopathology. First seen in infants, separation anxiety in root of parental-child stress may lay the foundations for future disorders in children. There is a direct correlation between maternal stress and child stress that is factored in both throughout adolescent development. In a situation where the mother is absent, any primary caregiver to the child could be seen as the "maternal" relationship. Essentially, the child would bond with the primary caregiver, and may exude some personality traits of the caregiver.

In studies of child in two age groups of pregnancy to five years, and fifteen years and twenty years, Raposa and colleagues (2011) studied the impact of psychopathology in the child-maternal relationship and how not only the mothers stress affected the child, but the child's stress affected the mother. Historically, it was believed that mothers who had post partum depression might be the reason their child has mental disorders both earlier and later in development. However this correlation was found to not only reflect maternal depression on child psychopathology, but also child psychopathology could reflect on maternal depression.

Children with a predisposition to psychopathology may cause higher stress in the relationship with their mother, and mothers who have psychopathology may also cause higher stress in the relationship with their child. Child psychopathology creates stress in parenting which may increase the severity of the psychopathology within the child. Together, these factors push and pull the relationship thus causing higher levels of depression, ADHD, defiant disorder, learning disabilities, and pervasive developmental disorder in both the mother and the child. The outline and summary of this study is found below: ""In looking at child-related stress, the number of past child mental health diagnoses significantly predicted a higher number of acute stressors for mothers as well as more chronic stress in the mother-child relationship at age 15. These increased levels of maternal stress and mother-child relationship stress at age 15 then predicted higher levels of maternal depression when the youth were 20 years old.

Looking more closely at the data, the authors found that it was the chronic stress in the mother-child relationship and the child-related acute stressors that were the linchpins between child psychopathology and maternal depression. The stress is what fueled the fires between mother and child mental health. Going one step further, the researchers found that youth with a history of more than one diagnosis as well as youth that had externalizing disorders (e.g., conduct disorder) had the highest number of child-related stressors and the highest levels of mother-child stress. Again, all of the findings held up when other potentially stressful variables, such as economic worries and past maternal depression, were controlled for.

Additionally, siblings- both older and younger and of both genders, can be factored into the etiology and development of child psychopathology. In a longitudinal study of maternal depression and older male child depression and antisocial behaviors on younger siblings adolescent mental health outcome. The study factored in ineffective parenting and sibling conflicts such as sibling rivalry. Younger female siblings were more directly affected by maternal depression and older brother depression and anti social behaviors when the indirect effects were not place, in comparison to younger male siblings who showed no such comparison. However, if an older brother were anti-social, the younger child- female or male would exude higher anti-social behaviors. In the presence of a sibling conflict, anti social behavior was more influential on younger male children than younger female children. Female children were more sensitive to pathological familial environments, thus showing that in a high- stress environment with both maternal depression and older- male sibling depression and anti social behavior, there is a higher risk of female children developing psychopathological disorders. This was a small study, and more research needs to be done especially with older female children, paternal relationships, maternal-paternal-child stress relationships, and/or caregiver-child stress relationships if the child is orphaned or not being raised by the biological parent to reach a conclusive child-parent stress model on the effects of familial and environmental pathology on the child's development.

== Temperament ==
The child-parent stress and development is only one hypothesis for the etiology of child psychopathology. Other experts believe that child temperament is a large factor in the development of child psychopathology. High susceptibility to child psychopathology is marked by low levels of effortful control and high levels of emotionality and neuroticism. Parental divorce is often a large factor in childhood depression and other psychopathological disorders. This is more so when the divorce involves a long-drawn separation and one parent bad-mouthing the other. That is not to say that divorce will lead to psychopathological disorders, there are also other factors such as temperament, trauma, and other negative life events (e.g. death, sudden moving of home, physical or sexual abuse), genetics, environment, and nurture that correlate to the onset of a disorder. Research has also shown that child maltreatment may increase risk for various forms of psychopathology as it increases threat sensitivity, decreases responsivity to reward, and causes deficits in emotion recognition and understanding. Psychopaths states that up to 30% of the population exhibits varying levels of diminished empathy, a tendency towards taking risks, and an excessive sense of self importance.

Found in "The Role of Temperament in the Etiology of Child Psychopathology", a model for the etiology of child psychopathology by Vasey and Dadds (2001) proposed that the four things that are important to the development of psychopathological disorders is: 1) biological factors: hormones, genetics, neurotransmitters 2) psychological: self-esteem, coping skills, cognitive issues 3) social factors: family rearing, negative learning experiences, and stress 4) child's temperament. Using an array of neurological scans and exams, psychological evaluations, family medical history, and observing the child in daily factors can help the physician find the etiology of the psychopathological disorder to help release the child of the symptoms through therapy, medication use, social skills training, and life style changes.

Child psychopathology can cause separation anxiety from parents, attention deficit disorders in children, sleep disorders in children, aggression with both peers and adults, night terrors, extreme anxiety, anti social behavior, depression symptoms, aloof attitude, sensitive emotions, and rebellious behavior that are not in line of typical childhood development. Aggression is found to manifest in children before five years of age, and early stress and aggression in the parental-child relationship correlates with the manifestation of aggression. Aggression in children causes problematic peer relationships, difficulty adjusting, and coping problems. Children who fail to overcome acceptable ways of coping and emotion expression are put on tract for psychopathological disorders and violent and anti social behaviors into adolescence and adulthood. There is a higher rate of substance abuse in these children with coping and aggression issues, and causes a cycle of emotional instability and manifestation psychopathological disorders.

== Neurology and etiology ==
Borderline personality disorder (BPD) is one of many psychopathology disorders a child can develop. In the neurobiological scheme, borderline personality disorder may have effects on the left amygdala. In a 2003 study of BPD patients versus control patients, when faced with expressions that were happy, sad, or fearful BPD patients showed significantly more activation versus control patients. In neutral faces, BPD patients attributed negative qualities to these faces. As stated by Gabbard, an experimenter in this study: "A hyperactive amygdala may be involved in the predisposition to be hyper vigilant and over reactive to relatively benign emotional expressions. Misreading neutral faces is clearly related to transference misreadings that occur in psychotherapy and the creation of bad object experiences linked with projective identification."

Also linked to BPD, is the presence of serotonin transporter (5-HTT) in a short allele demonstrated larger amygdala neuronal activity when presented with fearful stimuli as in comparison to individuals with a long allele of 5-HTT. As found in the Dunedin Longitudinal Study a short allele of 5-HTT predisposes the person to have hyperactivity in the amygdala in response to trauma, and thus moderated the impact of stressful life events leading to a higher risk of depression and suicidal idealities. These same qualities were not observed in individuals with long alleles of 5-HTT. However, the environment the child is in can change in impact of this gene, proving that correct treatment, intensive social support, and a healthy and nurturing environment can modify genetic vulnerability.

Possibly the most studied or documented of the child psychopathologies is attention deficit hyperactivity disorder (ADHD) which is marked with learning disabilities, mood disorders, or aggression. Though believed to be over diagnosed, ADHD is highly comorbid for other disorders such as depression and obsessive–compulsive disorder. In studies of the prefrontal cortex in ADHD children, which is responsible for the regulation of behavior, cognition, and attention; and in the dopamine system there has been identified a hidden genetic polymorphisms. More specifically, the 7-repeat allele of the dopamine D4 receptor gene, responsible for inhibited prefrontal cortex cognition and less efficient receptors, causes more externalized behaviors such as aggression since the child has trouble "thinking through" seemingly ordinary and at level childhood tasks.

== Agenesis of the corpus callosum and etiology ==
Agenesis of the corpus callosum (ACC) is used to determine the frequency of social and behavioral problems in children with a prevalence rate of about 2–3%. ACC is described as a defect in the brain where the 200 million axons that make the corpus callosum are either completely absent, or partially gone. In many cases, the anterior commissure is still present to allow for the passing of information from one cerebral hemisphere to the other. The children are of normal intelligence level. For younger children, ages two to five, Agenesis of the corpus callosum causes problems in sleep. Sleep is critical for development in children, and lack of sleep can set the grounds for a manifestation of psychopathological disorders. In children ages six to eleven, ACC showed manifestation in problems with social function, thought, attention, and somatic grievances. In comparison, of children with autism, children with ACC showed less impairment on almost all scales such as anxiety and depression, attention, abnormal thoughts, and social function versus autistic children. However, a small percentage of children with ACC showed traits that may lead to the diagnosis of autism in the areas of social communications and social interactions but do not show the same symptoms of autism in the repetitive and restricted behaviors category. The difficulties from ACC may lead to the etiology of child psychopathological disorders, such as depression or ADHD and manifest many autistic-like disorders that can cause future psychological disorders in later adolescence. The etiology of child psychopathology is a multi-factor path. A slew of factors must be taken into account before diagnosis of a disorder.

The child's genetics, environment, temperament, past medical history, family medical history, prevalence of symptoms and neuro-anatomical structures are all factors that should be considered when diagnosing a child with a psychopathological disorder. Thousands of children each year are misdiagnosed and put on the wrong treatment, which may result in the manifestation of other disorders the child would have not have gotten else wise. There are hundreds of causes of psychopathological disorders, and each one manifests at different ages and stages in child development and can come out due to trauma and stress. Some disorders may "disappear" and reappear in the presence of a trauma, depression, or stress similar to the one that brought the disorder out in the child in the beginning.

== Treatment ==
In the United States, It is estimated that 1 in 6 children from ages two to eight have a psychopathology disorder. Boys of this age are more likely to be diagnosed with a disorder than girls. From age 9-17, at least 1 in 5 children have a diagnosed disorder, but only about a third of these children receive treatment for their disorder. Anxiety and depression disorders in children- whether noted or unnoted, are found to be a precursor for similar episodes in adulthood. Usually a large stressor similar to the one the person experienced in childhood brings out the anxiety or depression in adulthood.

Multifinality refers to the idea that two children can react to same stressful event quite differently, and may display divergent types of problem behavior. Psychopathological disorders are extremely situational- having to take into account the child, the genetics, the environment, the stressor, and many other factors to tailor the best type of treatment to relieve the child of the psychopathology symptoms.

Many child psychopathology disorders are treated with control medications prescribed by a pediatrician or psychiatrist. After extensive evaluation of the child through school visits, by psychologists and physicians, a medication can be prescribed. A patient may need to go through several trials of medicines to find the best fit, as many cause uncomfortable and undesired side effects- such as dry mouth or suicidal thoughts can occur. There are many classes of drugs a physician can choose from and they are: psychostimulants, beta blockers, atypical antipsychotics, lithium, alpha-2 agonists, traditional antipsychotics, SSRIs, and anticonvulsant mood- stabilizers. Given the multifinality of psychopathological disorders, two children may be on the same medication for two completely different disorders, or have the same disorder and be taking two completely different medications.

ADHD is the most commonly diagnosed disorder of child psychopathology; however, the medications used to treat it have a high abuse rate, especially among college-aged student. Psycho stimulants such as Ritalin, amphetamine- related stimulant drugs: e.g., Adderall, and antidepressants such as Wellbutrin have been successfully used to treat ADHD. Many of these drug treatment options are paired with behavioral treatment such as therapy or social skills lessons. Counter-intuitively, patients whose ADHD is given therapeutic treatment with psychostimulants actually have significantly lower rates of drug abuse and addiction than their untreated peers; psychostimulants are widely abused drugs, but in those treated for ADHD, psychostimulant treatment actually reduces the patient's risk of acquiring an addiction.

Lithium has shown to be extremely effective in treating bipolar disorder, as it is affective for both mania and depression, and with chronic treatment it helps to prevent relapse. Additionally, lithium treatment produces notable reductions in suicide in all exposed populations, including general populations whose drinking water has naturally high levels of lithium salts. Lithium is the only known intervention that is generically effective in reducing suicidal ideation and behavior, and is additionally the only agent known to affect suicide directly and specifically; this treatment effect is independent from the resolution of any other possible underlying cause, and so it is still observed even in, e.g., patients who continue to experience severe depression that is resistant to treatment. This effect on suicide is especially remarkable in BPD patients, who are especially high risk; in BPD patients that successfully comply with lithium treatment, suicide rates begin to more closely resemble the non-BPD population, and do so for as long as these BPD patients continue to take use lithium as directed. Additionally, lithium is effective in reducing aggressive and/or antisocial behavior; as in suicide, this effect is generic and occurs in all exposed populations, but the effect is larger in patients with predisposing illness, such as ADHD. Consequently, lithium appears to be highly effective in treating antisocial behaviors in BPD patients that also have ADHD (which is highly co-morbid with BPD, and thus frequently co-occurs in BPD patients). However, there is some uncertainty as to whether this observed treatment effect may be an indirect result of inadequate initial treatment of ADHD in those with BPD. Psychostimulant medications, such as methylphenidate and mixed amphetamine salts, are the only known gold standard treatment for ADHD, being both safe and highly effective for most patients with ADHD; however, psychostimulant use (or abuse) is a known risk factor for the occurrence of (hypo)manic episodes in BPD patients. (Indeed, even in those without BPD, these medications can produce states resembling mania, even in those who do not experience them otherwise, though such occurrences are extremely rare at the therapeutic dosages used to treat ADHD.) As a result, clinicians are reluctant to prescribe these medications for patients with BPD, and where do choose to prescribe them, they may be reluctant to titrate the patient's dosage upward as they normally would, as a precaution against any possible risk of inducing (hypo)mania. Thus, ADHD-associated antisocial behaviors that persist despite the patient receiving ADHD treatment, which are resolved by subsequent treatment with lithium, may simply indicate inadequate control of ADHD symptoms, and not that lithium is a uniquely effective frontline treatment for "treatment-resistant" antisocial behavior in BPD patients with co-morbid ADHD. In any case, there is no evidence that lithium is effective as a primary treatment for ADHD; its only observed utility is a reduction in aggressive/antisocial behavior, which is observed generically in anyone taking lithium, and is not specific to ADHD, and those symptoms may be better controlled by simply ensuring that gold standard treatments for ADHD are being titrated adequately. The mechanism of lithium include the inhibition of GSK-3, it is a glutamate antagonism at NMDA receptors that together make lithium a neuroprotective medicine. The drug relieves bipolar symptoms, aggressiveness and irritability. Lithium has many, many side effects and requires weekly blood tests to tests for toxicity of the drug.

Medications that act on cell membrane ion channels, enhance GABA inhibitory neurotransmission, and inhibit excitatory glutamate transmission have shown to be extremely effective in treating an array of child psychopathological disorders. Pharmaceutical companies are in the process of creating new drugs and improving those on the market to help avoid negative and possibly life altering short term and long term side effects, making drugs more safe to use in younger children and over long periods of time during adolescent development.

A 2025 systematic review by AHRQ and PCORI emphasized the effectiveness of psychosocial interventions, especially those involving parental participation, in reducing disruptive behaviors in children and adolescents. These approaches outperformed usual care in preschool and school-aged children. While medications such as stimulants and antipsychotics offered modest improvements in select cases, they carried a higher risk of side effects, and long-term comparative effectiveness remains unclear.

== Psychotherapy treatments ==
Some psychological disorders commonly found in children include depression, anxiety, and conduct disorder. For adolescents with depression, a combination of antidepressants and cognitive-behavioral or interpersonal psychotherapy is recommended, in contrast there is not much evidence for the efficacy of antidepressants in children under 12 years of age, therefore a combination of parent training and cognitive-behavioral psychotherapy is recommended. For children and adolescents with anxiety disorders, cognitive-behavioral therapy in combination with exposure-based techniques is a highly recommended and evidence-based treatment. Research suggests that children and adolescents with conduct disorder or disruptive behavior may benefit from psychotherapy that includes both a behavioral component and parental involvement.

== Future of child psychopathology ==
The future of child psychopathology- etiology and treatment has a two-way path. While many professionals agree that many children who have a disorder do not receive proper treatment, at the rate of 5–15% that receive treatment leaving many children in the dark. In the same boat are the physicians who also say that not only do more of these disorders need to be recognized in children and treated properly, but also even those children who show some qualifying symptoms of a disorder but not to the degree of diagnosis should also receive treatment and therapy to avoid the manifestation of the disorder. By treating children even with slight degrees of a psychopathological disorder, children can show improvements in their relationships with peers, family, and teachers and also improvements in school, mental health, and personal development. Many physicians believe the best prevention and help starts in the home and the school of the child, before physicians and psychologists are contacted.

== Theory and research ==
The current trend in the U.S. is to understand child psychopathology from a systems based perspective called developmental psychopathology. Recent emphasis has also been on understanding psychological disorders from a relational perspective with attention also given to neurobiology. Practitioners who follow attachment theory believe that early attachment experiences of children can promote adaptive strategies or lay the groundwork for maladaptive ways of coping which can later lead to mental health disorders.

Research and clinical work on child psychopathology tends to fall under several main areas: etiology, epidemiology, diagnosis, assessment, and treatment.

Parents are considered a reliable source of information because they spend more time with children than any other adult. A child's psychopathology can be connected to parental behaviors. Clinicians and researchers have experienced problems with children's self-reports and rely on adults to provide the information.

== Early detection and prevention of child psychopathology ==
Detecting signs of psychopathology in children during their formative years is crucial for timely intervention. Early intervention programs focus on mitigating risk factors and strengthening protective factors to prevent the onset or progression of mental health disorders. These preventative measures can range from cognitive-behavioral therapy to social skills training for the children. Recognizing and addressing symptoms early can significantly improve long-term outcomes, potentially reducing the severity or even preventing certain disorders from developing fully.

== See also ==
- Category:Mental disorders diagnosed in childhood
