= Sensory friendly =

Sensory processing disorder accommodation

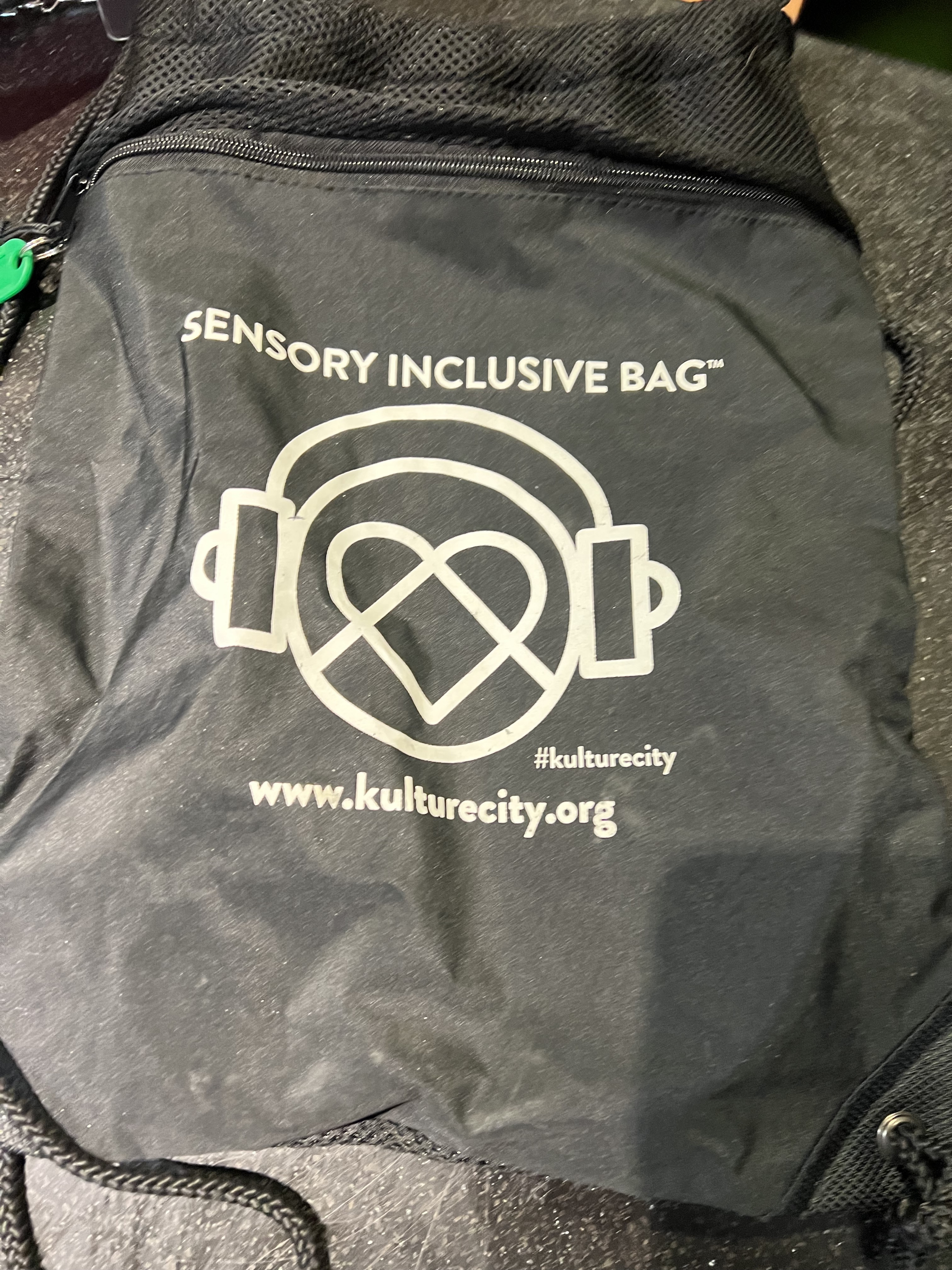
Sensory-inclusive bag for people with sensory processing disorders

Sensory friendly refers to a designed environment which is an accommodation for people who have a sensory dysfunction or a sensory processing disorder. There are sensory-friendly experiences which are offered by businesses and there is also sensory-friendly furniture.

== Background ==
Adults and children who report a sensory dysfunction or a sensory-integration disturbance often also present with a learning disability. A sensory-friendly environment is created to assist those with a sensory processing disorder (SPD). The disorder is characterized by a hypersensitivity to stimuli accompanied by anxiety. The Sensory Processing Disorder Foundation believes that there may be as many as one in every 20 people living with a sensory processing disorder. Sources debate whether SPD is an independent disorder or represents the observed symptoms of various other, more well-established, disorders. SPD is not included in the Diagnostic and Statistical Manual of Mental Disorders of the American Psychiatric Association, and the American Academy of Pediatrics has recommended in 2012 that pediatricians not use SPD as a stand-alone diagnosis.

== Autism ==
Autistic people often experience sensory overload when they are in their communities. To accommodate those with these specific disabilities, some businesses offer sensory-friendly hours for shopping, eating or attending community events.

For autistic adults, modification of the workplace environment includes softened lighting, reduced noise and partitions around work areas.

== PTSD and dementia ==
Sensory challenges are often experienced by people with post-traumatic stress disorder (PTSD) and dementia. Sensory-friendly areas of venues might include noise-cancelling headphones or quieter areas where guests can relax.

== Venues ==
Some theaters offer sensory-friendly film showings. For this type of showing, the sound is turned down, and the lights inside the theater are brighter. The theaters also allow attendees to move around during the presentation, and even converse with the screen. The diminished stimulation is considered sensory friendly.

The Betty Brinn Children's Museum sells a Sensory-Friendly Play Pass to accommodate children who are in need of a calmer, quieter space. The Marbles Kids Museum hosts an event for families to experience Marbles in a calmer, quieter environment, which is considered sensory-friendly playtime. They call it "Lights Up, Sound Down".

== Designs ==
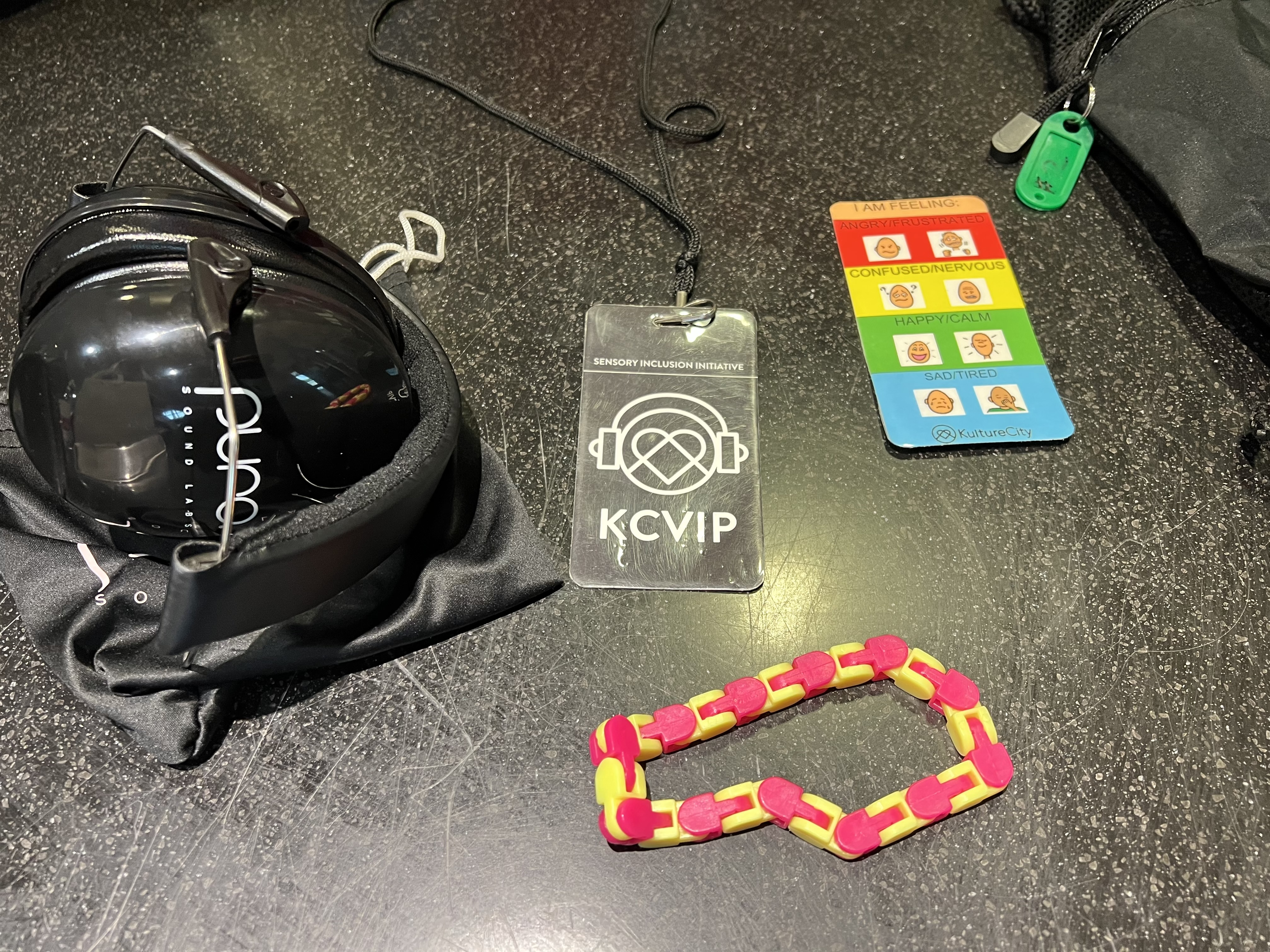
Sensory-inclusive bag contents: Noise-cancelling headphones, KultureCity VIP tag, fidget toy and verbal cue card

The Target Corporation tailored furniture that they sell to what they called sensory-friendly designs. They also advertise weighted blankets which they say are "calming". In June of 2022 the Milwaukee Brewers major league baseball team announced that they would designate a quiet area at American Family Field with sensory bags to accommodate those with sensory processing disorders. They stated that they would have "sensory bags" which will contain noise-cancelling headphones, a fidget toy, verbal cue cards and a weighted lap pad.

== Organizations ==
KultureCity is a nonprofit organization which provides training and certification for venues and events to accommodate those with sensory sensitivities. The organization also provides a software application for Apple and Android devices which lists sensory-friendly venues. The application also lists sensory-inclusive modifications. Their motto is: "Make the nevers possible by creating sensory accessibility and inclusion for those with invisible disabilities".

Another organization which provides sensory-friendly kits, tools and suggestions to transform any space into a sensory-inclusive space is Sensory City. The organization also provides a sensory-friendly certificate to businesses.

== See also ==
- Autism-friendly
- Curb cut effect
- Health effects from noise
- Sensory garden
- Sensory room
- Soundproofing
