= Sensory Processing Disorder Foundation =

Organization in Colorado, United States

Doing business as STAR Institute, the STAR Center Foundation (formerly known as the Sensory Processing Disorder Foundation and the KID Foundation) is a registered 501(c)(3), nonprofit organization dedicated to treatment, research and education related to sensory integration and processing.

The first iteration of STAR Institute was founded in 1979 by Lucy Jane Miller, who retired in October 2019. At its inception, the foundation was funded by U.S. Public Health Service division of Maternal and Child Health (MCH). The Wallace Research Foundation was attracted by the foundation in 1995 and helped fund the development of a psychophysiology research laboratory to study sensory processing disorder (SPD).

Since October 2019, Virginia Spielmann has been the Executive Director.

== Services and programs ==
STAR Institute has programs for research, education, and treatment, which operate from one center in Centennial, Colorado.

The STAR Institute treatment department delivers therapeutic supports according to the STAR Frame of Reference. STAR Institute provides services through the lifespan with a dedicated adult and adolescent team. They also have a specialist feeding team.

The STAR Institute Research Center provides the basis for the education and treatment programs, investigating neurological underpinnings and exploring the effectiveness of sensory integration therapy for different populations.

== History ==
For many years a primary focus of the foundation was to get sensory processing disorder added to the American Psychiatric Association's Diagnostic and Statistical Manual of Mental Disorders. Sensory Processing Disorder was defined as "a complex disorder of the brain that affects developing children and adults". Sensory Processing Disorder or SPD is defined as "differences in sensory integration and processing that prevent function and participation in day-to-day life".

From 1995 to 2017, sensory integration and processing was researched by an interdisciplinary university-based research group led by the STAR Institute with support from the Wallace Research Foundation. The project involved about 50 scientists from the fields of neuroscience, epidemiology, genetics, intervention, and neuropathology.

== See also ==
- Sensory friendly
