= Developmental coordination disorder =

Neurodevelopmental disorder chiefly affecting motor skills

Developmental coordination disorder (DCD / dyspraxia)
- Other names: Developmental motor coordination disorder, dyspraxia
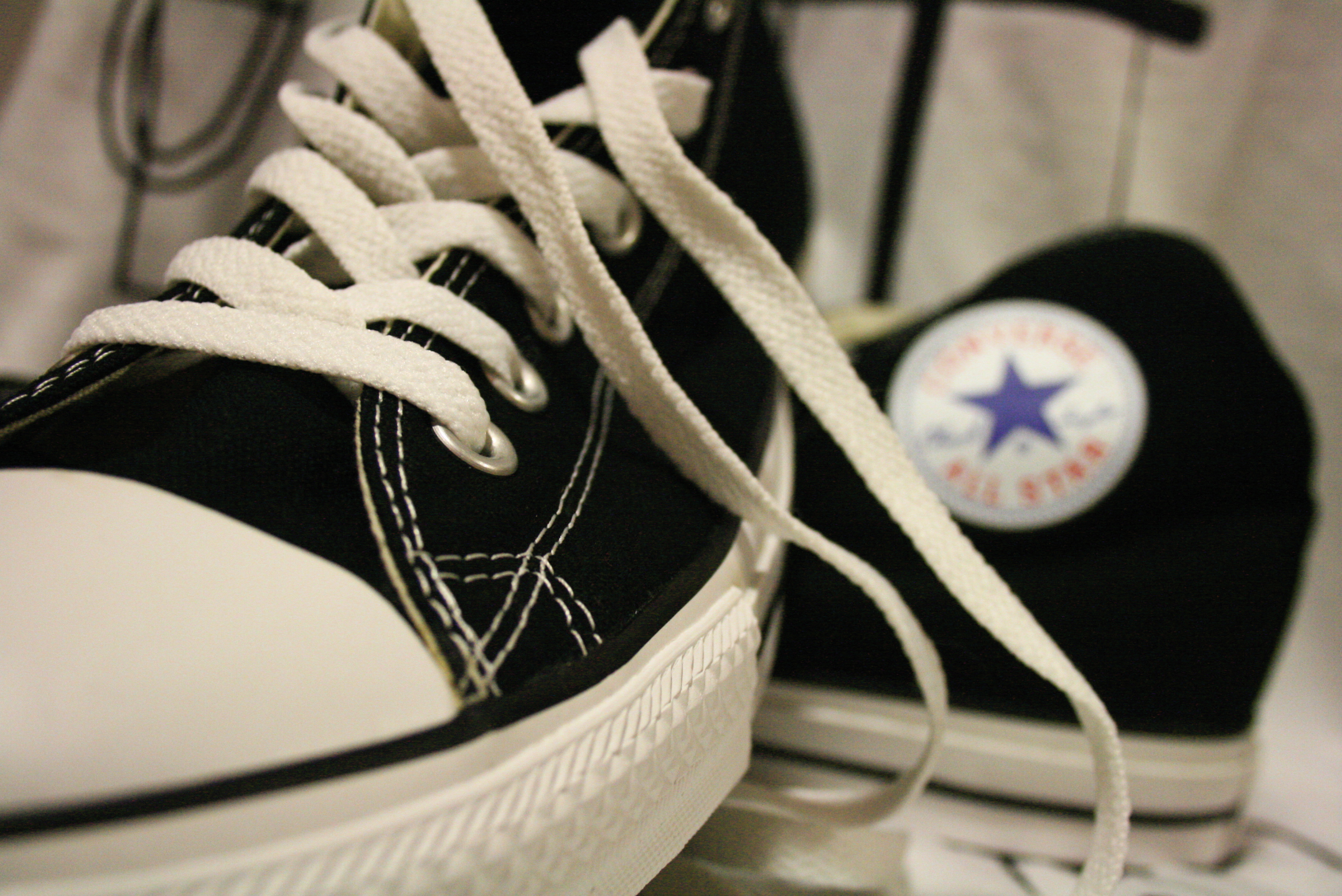
- Many people with DCD / dyspraxia have difficulty with tying shoelaces, handwriting, developmental motor skills, activities of daily living, and performing other tasks that require coordination and motor control.
- Specialty: Psychiatry, neurology
- Symptoms: Impaired acquisition and execution of coordinated motor skills
- Complications: Academic difficulties, low self-esteem, anxiety symptoms, depressive symptoms, reduced participation in physical activities, reduced physical fitness, fatigue, increased risk of obesity and other increased cardiovascular risk factors
- Usual onset: Early developmental period
- Duration: Often persists into adulthood
- Differential diagnosis: Cerebral palsy, neuromuscular disorders, acquired brain injury, fetal alcohol spectrum disorder, genetic and metabolic disorders, significant visual impairment, intellectual disability
- Treatment: Physical therapy, occupational therapy
- Frequency: 5–6% (of all school aged children)

Developmental coordination disorder (DCD), also known as developmental motor coordination disorder, developmental dyspraxia, or simply dyspraxia (praxis from Ancient Greek meaning 'doing', 'action', 'practice', or 'transaction'), is a neurodevelopmental motor disorder characterised by challenges with the acquisition and execution of coordinated movements and motor skills that are substantially below what would be expected given the individual's chronological age.

The etiology of DCD / dyspraxia is unknown. Motor function requires the coordination of neurologic, physiologic, and biologic processes, including proprioception (body awareness), strength, balance, fine and gross motor coordination, motor planning (praxis), dexterity, vestibular integration, oculomotor coordination, and visuo-motor coordination. Problems in any of these areas can result in impairment of motor skills. Deficits in fine or gross motor skills and movements interfere with activities of daily living. Difficulties may present as clumsiness, slowness or inaccuracy of performance of motor skills (e.g., throwing or catching objects, using cutlery, handwriting, pointing accurately at targets, running, jumping, riding a bike, use of tools, participating in physical activity, or sport skills). A diagnosis of DCD / dyspraxia is reached when a motor skills deficit relative to their age-matched peers is not better explained by intellectual disability, significant visual impairment, or another neurological or medical condition affecting movement, such as cerebral palsy, neuromuscular disease, acquired brain injury, fetal alcohol spectrum disorder, or certain genetic and metabolic disorders. DCD / dyspraxia has onset in early childhood and often persists into adolescence and adulthood.

Occupational therapy and physiotherapy can help people with DCD / dyspraxia to develop and improve their coordination and motor control to achieve things that they might otherwise find challenging to accomplish. While DCD / dyspraxia is known to co-occur with other neurodevelopmental disorders, its related gross and fine motor impairment are not necessarily associated with lower intelligence. People with DCD / dyspraxia may have low self-esteem because their age-related peers can often complete tasks and participate in activities that they struggle with on a daily basis. Developmental coordination disorder, like some other neurological conditions that are not immediately obvious to others but can greatly affect a person's life, is also typically a hidden disability to the general public.

== Terminology ==
Developmental coordination disorder (DCD) was introduced as a diagnostic category in the Diagnostic and Statistical Manual of Mental Disorders (DSM-III-R) in 1987. The corresponding diagnosis is called developmental motor coordination disorder in countries that use the International Classification of Diseases 11th Revision (ICD-11). The terms dyspraxia and developmental dyspraxia are also widely used, especially in the United Kingdom, as an alternative term for DCD. International clinical practice recommendations endorse DCD as the preferred term in research publications.

Other terms have historically been used to describe DCD or related motor difficulties. These terms are recommended to be avoided because they may be outdated, ambiguous, or describe different or overlapping conditions:

- Developmental apraxia
- Apraxia (distinct from 'childhood apraxia of speech' and 'acquired apraxia')
- Sensory integrative dysfunction
- Perceptuo-motor dysfunction or perceptuo-motor difficulties
- Motor learning difficulty
- Physical awkwardness
- Movement difficulty
- Mild motor delay
- Clumsy child syndrome
- Minimal brain dysfunction
- Disorder of attention and motor perception (DAMP)

== Epidemiology ==
The etiology of DCD / dyspraxia is unknown as of 2024. The prevalence of DCD / dyspraxia varies between study populations and diagnostic criteria used but in most reviews, the prevalence in the general population of school-aged children is 6% DCD / dyspraxia is more often reported in boys, with a male to female ratio ranging from 2:1 to 7:1. DCD / dyspraxia is also related to history of preterm birth and low birth weight. Various areas of development can be affected by DCD / dyspraxia (activities of daily living, academic performance, leisure, recreation, play, and social participation) and these may persist into adulthood.

== Signs and symptoms ==
=== Childhood ===
While signs and symptoms of DCD / dyspraxia can be noted before age six, most become apparent when they interfere with social development or when children enter school at approximately age six and are subsequently compared with their peers. In retrospective reviews, children with DCD / dyspraxia may have had problems with sucking and swallowing in their first year of life, delayed motor milestones such as sitting, crawling, walking, running, or jumping, persistent toe-walking or abnormal gait after fourteen months of age, speech problems or persistent drooling after thirty months of age.

Children with DCD / dyspraxia may have difficulty with everyday tasks such as putting on shoes, tying shoelaces, dressing, self care, and using cutlery. Parents may also report difficulties with riding a bike, playing catch, dropping objects, tripping, poor pencil or crayon grasp, difficulty with finger isolation or accurate sequential pointing, difficulty pointing accurately to pictures, letters, or symbols used for communication, difficulty cutting with scissors, difficulty drawing a straight line, difficulty regulating movement speed or adjusting the amount of force used, differences in walking or running mechanics, or bumping into doorways or chairs. Such children may require longer and repeated instruction to learn new motor skills, may avoid participation in gym class or sport, or avoid physical activity and fitness, or their motor challenges may prevent participation in particular physical activities. Children with DCD / dyspraxia may also have difficulty processing instructions with multiple steps as well as educational, emotional regulation, and social interaction challenges.

=== Adolescence and adulthood ===
Motor difficulties persist into adolescence and adulthood in the majority of cases. DCD / dyspraxia may present as challenges with ball handling skills, agility, handwriting, typing, using a touch screen or mouse, driving, and playing sports. Co-occurring speech and language difficulties may also persist into adulthood. Individuals with DCD / dyspraxia often have difficulty learning new motor skills or applying skills in a different environment (generalization of skills).

=== Health consequences ===
DCD / dyspraxia may be associated with negative short and long term health consequences including decreased participation, social isolation, obesity, low self esteem, reduced mental well being, poor physical fitness (i.e. decreased flexibility, strength, endurance), poor pulmonary function, increased cardiovascular risk factors (elevated triglycerides and high blood pressure), and fatigue or stress associated with the increased effort and demands of performing challenging motor tasks.

=== Motor-cognitive integration challenges ===
In DCD / dyspraxia, impairments in motor planning and coordination may interact with cognitive processes. Evidence from research and clinical practice indicates that DCD / dyspraxia is not limited to a physical disorder, and there may be deficits in executive functions, behavioural organisation, and emotional regulation that extend beyond the motor impairments and which may occur independently of diagnoses of co-morbid conditions.

Motor coordination and motor planning difficulties in DCD / dyspraxia can affect the accuracy and timing of task performance, especially in activities that require sequencing or sustained attention. Increased cognitive and motor planning demands may also place additional load on working memory and executive processes, contributing to challenges remembering the next step in the sequence or the motor plan, selecting the appropriate limb for movement, or executing movements in the correct order or at the appropriate time. As a result, individuals with DCD / dyspraxia may produce incomplete, mis-sequenced, or delayed motor responses, even when they understand the task at hand. Working memory and organizational difficulties may affect the ability to remember multistep instructions, organize time, meet deadlines, keep track of belongings, or carry out activities that involve multiple steps, such as cooking. These consequences are understood as reflecting challenges in motor–cognitive integration rather than a direct measure of underlying intellectual ability.

Emotional factors, especially anxiety regarding the ability to complete a task, may influence motor performance in individuals with DCD / dyspraxia. Anxiety is associated with changes in movement timing, variability, and visuomotor control, although the direction of this relationship remains unclear.

While most of the general population experience these problems to some extent, they have a more significant impact on the lives of people with DCD / dyspraxia. Many benefit from working in a structured environment, as repeating the same routine minimises difficulty with organizational ability and self regulation, and allows them to commit procedures to long-term memory.

=== Gross motor control ===
Whole body movement and motor coordination issues mean that major foundational motor skills including walking, running, climbing, and jumping can be affected, which can cause challenges when more difficult movements are attempted. These difficulties vary from person to person and may include the following:

- Poor timing
- Poor balance
- Difficulty combining movements into a controlled sequence
- Problems with spatial awareness and body awareness, including proprioception
- Clumsiness to the point of knocking things over, causing minor injuries to oneself and bumping into people accidentally
- Difficulty inhibiting motor responses
- Delayed initiation of movement in some motor tasks
- Difficulty with bilateral alternating movements
- Difficulty with coordination of upper and lower body movements
- Difficulty keeping still, sometimes accompanied by frequent movement of the arms or legs
- Motor overflow - unintended movements accompanying a voluntary movement
- Difficulty maintaining a consistent rhythm during repeating movements or synchronizing movements with an external beat, and continuing movements once started or after an external auditory cue stops
- Difficulty adjusting movement direction and maintaining balance when navigating obstacles or changing direction
- Difficulty controlling movement speed and making corrections to ongoing movements when the task requires it
- Difficulty controlling and maintaining force production during movement

=== Fine motor control ===
Fine-motor difficulties in DCD / dyspraxia can affect activities of daily living, school-related tasks, communication, and other activities requiring manual dexterity and bilateral coordination. Examples include handwriting, typing, drawing, cutting with scissors, finger isolation, accurate pointing to pictures, letters or symbols used for communication, dressing and fastening clothing, using cutlery, brushing teeth, grooming, manipulating small objects, and performing cooking or household tasks.

Specifically, this may include:

- Difficulty forming letters accurately and consistently
- Reduced handwriting output and increased pausing during writing
- Establishing or maintaining a functional and efficient pencil grip
- Inaccurate or incomplete motor execution during handwriting or sequential targeted pointing
- Reduced speed or efficiency when typing on a keyboard
- Difficulty coordinating eye and hand movements during sequential pointing

Difficulty in determining left from right and atypical handedness patterns, including higher rates of left-handedness or mixed-handedness, and a weaker or task-dependent hand preference, have also been reported in individuals with DCD / dyspraxia

== Co-occurring disorders and secondary features ==
DCD / dyspraxia is known to co-occur with other neurodevelopmental disorders, Attention Deficit Hyperactivity Disorder (ADHD), and autism. Approximately 50% of those with ADHD have concomitant DCD / dyspraxia, although estimates vary depending on the population studied and diagnostic criteria used. Motor impairment and DCD / dyspraxia are also highly prevalent in autism. Studies have demonstrated 79% of autistic children with definite motor impairment as measured by standardised motor assessments and approximately 90% at risk of DCD / dyspraxia or met DCD / dyspraxia criteria, despite the majority not receiving a formal diagnosis. In addition, increased severity of autism symptoms is associated with a higher risk of screening positive for DCD / dyspraxia as well as greater severity of motor difficulties. Other co-occurring conditions and associated features are listed below. Prosopagnosia has also been reported in adults with probable DCD / dyspraxia.

Reported co-occurring conditions include:

- Autism
- ADHD
- Developmental Language Disorder
- Developmental learning disorder
- Speech sound disorder
- Dysgraphia (difficulty with handwriting)
- Dyslexia (difficulty with reading and spelling)

Reported associated features of DCD / dyspraxia include:

- Oculomotor dysfunction including difficulty controlling eye movements, fixation, and visual tracking
- Visuomotor dysfunction including difficulty coordinating visual information with motor responses
- Visual perception and binocular vision difficulty including reduced depth perception and stereoacuity
- Hypermobility
- Altered vestibular function to support postural control
- Sensory processing and modulation differences
- Mathematical learning difficulties

It is unlikely for a person with DCD / dyspraxia to have all of these conditions and features. The clinical profiles of individuals with DCD / dyspraxia vary significantly and an area of major weakness for one person with DCD / dyspraxia can be an area of strength for another. For example, while some individuals with DCD / dyspraxia have difficulty with reading and spelling due to dyslexia, or with numeracy due to dyscalculia, others may have strong or above average reading and spelling or mathematical abilities. DCD / dyspraxia is best viewed as a heterogeneous neurodevelopmental motor disorder, with variable motor, cognitive, sensory, academic, social, and emotional profiles.

=== Speech, language, and communication difficulties ===
Speech and language difficulties have been reported in some individuals with DCD / dyspraxia, and DCD / dyspraxia may co-occur with developmental language disorder (DLD), speech sound disorder, or childhood apraxia of speech (CAS) (formerly known as developmental verbal dyspraxia (DVD) in the UK). CAS primarily affects the planning and programming of movements for speech, whereas DCD / dyspraxia is a broader disorder affecting the planning and execution of both fine and gross motor movements. When speech difficulties are present in individuals with DCD / dyspraxia, they may include slower articulation, sound distortions, or atypical oral-motor patterns during more complex speech tasks. Some research suggests DCD / dyspraxia and associated oral motor impairments as a motor-based explanation for limited functional speech in minimally speaking and nonspeaking autistic individuals, however the extent to which these difficulties are specifically attributed to DCD / dyspraxia remains uncertain. Speech and language difficulties reported in people with DCD / dyspraxia include:

- Difficulties controlling the speech organs
- Difficulties making speech sounds
- When DCD / dyspraxia co-occurs with CAS, difficulty sequencing sounds within words and connected speech
- When DCD / dyspraxia co-occurs with autism or other oral-motor/speech-motor conditions, additional difficulties with feeding / chewing, saliva control, and respiratory–phonatory coordination may also be present

Some individuals with DCD / dyspraxia have co-occurring language-development difficulties, which should be distinguished from impairments in the motor production of speech. Language abilities in individuals with DCD / dyspraxia are variable. Some children meet criteria for Developmental Language Disorder (DLD), while others have age-level language skills. However, even when language is intact, many individuals with DCD / dyspraxia experience difficulties with academic tasks that reflect a combination of motor coordination difficulties, increased cognitive load during task performance, differences in working memory, executive functioning, sensory processing, or visuo-perceptual differences rather than language ability alone.

=== Sensory processing or sensory modulation difficulties ===
A large proportion of children with DCD / dyspraxia show sensory processing or sensory modulation differences, however, the extent of concomitant sensory processing disorder as a distinct diagnosis is unclear because the latter is not consistently defined in the literature. Some individuals with DCD / dyspraxia exhibit hyper- or hypo-sensitivity to sensory input, although the type and extent of these differences vary. These differences may involve tactile, visual, auditory, or proprioceptive processing and can thus affect motor coordination, body and spatial awareness, and interaction with the environment. As an example, altered proprioceptive and visual processing may contribute to difficulties in judging body position and movement, while sensory modulation differences (how a person adjusts and regulates their response to sensory input) may influence a person's performance within a particular environment or in response to particular environmental stimuli. In addition, sensory modulating difficulties in individuals with DCD / dyspraxia can make them more prone to sensory overload, especially in environments with high sensory demands.

== Psychological and social consequences ==
=== Psychological domain ===
Individuals with DCD / dyspraxia may experience lower self-efficacy and reduced self-perceived competence, especially in social and peer-interactions. Symptoms of anxiety and depressive symptoms are also reported in children with DCD / dyspraxia. These difficulties are often associated with being continuously challenged in motor-based and everyday activities.

=== Social domain ===
Individuals with DCD / dyspraxia may be at increased risk of social exclusion, peer interaction challenges, and bullying, which can contribute to feelings of loneliness and reduce social participation.

=== Support domain ===
Adolescents and adults with DCD / dyspraxia may face barriers in accessing appropriate educational and institutional support. Lack of recognition and understanding of DCD / dyspraxia can contribute to under-identification and lack of support.

== Screening ==
DCD / dyspraxia should be suspected in school-age children who have difficulty with developmental tasks and milestones such as crawling, jumping, hopping, drawing, and imitative finger movements. Concerns about clumsiness may originate from the parents, clinicians, teachers, or therapists.

The Developmental Coordination Disorder Questionnaire (DCDQ), intended for ages 5 years 0 months to 15 years and 0 months, and the Little DCDQ, intended for ages 3 years 0 months to 4 years 11 months, are screening tools used to identify children who are suspected to have DCD / dyspraxia. They can be administered by a parent, teacher, or caregiver. The child is rated on how they compare to peers in areas like handwriting, ball skills, coordination, dressing, running, motor speed, and general clumsiness. If the child is at or below the age-specific cutoff score, the next step is to carry out a formal assessment for DCD / dyspraxia.

== Diagnosis ==
A physician will take a history of the developmental period and take note of any motor learning challenges early in life. A physician must also rule out other possible medical or neurological explanations for the motor difficulties. Where intellectual disability is suspected, a standardized IQ test or cognitive assessment may be used to determine whether motor difficulties exceed what would be expected for the person's cognitive and intellectual ability. Research in DCD / dyspraxia indicates that motor demands may affect performance on standardized cognitive assessments, especially in timed processing-speed tasks. In autistic individuals with significant motor and communication impairments, sensory-motor response demands of assessments may affect the interpretation of cognitive abilities or intellect. Similar testing limitations have been documented in other conditions with known motor impairment including cerebral palsy, Rett syndrome, and spinal muscular atrophy, where motor, speech, visual, or other response demands may lead to significant underestimation of cognitive abilities or intellect. Thus standardized scores may be invalid when no reliable communication or response method is available, or when the test's sensory-motor demands cannot be accommodated. Inability to complete a test should not itself be interpreted as evidence of intellectual impairment or refusal to participate.

A physiotherapist or occupational therapist may administer a standardized motor assessment such as the Movement Assessment Battery for Children (M-ABC) OR the Bruininks-Oseretsky Test of Motor Proficiency (BOT). A baseline motor assessment establishes the starting point for intervention programs and comparing children to typical rates of development may help to determine areas of difficulty and support needed.

The disorder is diagnosed using DSM-5 criteria:

- Acquisition and execution of coordinated motor skills are substantially below what would be expected given the child’s age and opportunity for skill learning and use (clumsiness, inaccuracy, or slowness of performance of motor skills)
- The motor skills deficit significantly and persistently interferes with activities of daily living and impacts school productivity, vocational skills, leisure activities, and play
- The onset of symptoms is in the early developmental period
- The motor skills deficit is not better explained by intellectual disability, visual impairment, or a neurological or medical condition affecting movement

In children who are suspected to have DCD / dyspraxia, other causes of motor impairment are assessed through medical history and physical examination. Although exclusion of other causes of impaired motor skills is necessary, it can be difficult to distinguish between conditions that may better explain the motor difficulties and conditions that may coexist with DCD / dyspraxia. In such cases, referral to specialist physician, physiotherapist, or occupational therapist with expertise in diagnosing and assessing DCD / dyspraxia may be warranted. A 2005 study of 105 teachers and 105 general practitioners in Wales found limited knowledge of DCD / dyspraxia, in both profession groups. The earlier these difficulties are noted and the earlier assessments occur, the sooner intervention can begin.

=== Activities of daily living (ADL) and motor function assessment ===
Clinical judgment is required to interpret the degree to which performance in daily activities is affected by motor function impairment and found to be significantly lower than that of age matched peers. The Leeds Consensus Statement identified scores of at or below the 5th percentile as evidence of abnormal motor skills and recommends to monitor children between the 5th and 15th. More recent clinical practice recommendations suggest total scores of at or below the 16th percentile as indicative of potential DCD / dyspraxia in children six years and older, but with results interpreted alongside of developmental history, functional impact, and the other diagnostic criteria for DCD / dyspraxia.

=== Assessment in individuals with sensorimotor and communication challenges ===
The M-ABC or BOT may have limitations when used with individuals who have significant communication and motor planning challenges. These assessments rely on imitation and structured motoric responses, and factors such as anxiety, physical readiness, attention, information processing, and sensory sensitivities may additionally affect performance independent of underlying motor ability. As a result, test scores in this group may show limited sensitivity at lower levels of performance, or not fully capture an individual's motor performance, areas of challenge, needed support, and motor learning potential. This highlights the need for cautious interpretation and / or adaptations to assessment procedures or supplementary assessments. An observational study of 85 Australian physiotherapists assessing motor function in young autistic children found that parent reports, clinical observations, and movement analysis were used more frequently than standardized motor assessments.

== Intervention ==
There is no cure for the condition . Instead, it is managed through therapy. Management and treatment of DCD / dyspraxia include:

- Individualised approaches
- Actively involve the child
- Prioritise functional skills that are relevant to everyday activities and participation, and are important to the child and parents
- Teach specific functional motor skills and provide opportunities to practise and to generalise across different activities and settings
- Involve multiple individuals in treatment plans (e.g. parents, teachers, health care professionals)
- Address the child's physical fitness (e.g. strength, endurance, flexibility)

Research supports Physical Therapy and Occupational Therapy for improving functional motor performance and participation as effective interventions for DCD / dyspraxia. International clinical practice recommendations for DCD / dyspraxia emphasise interventions that improve functional participation, motor performance, physical health, and quality of life, rather than focusing solely on impairment reduction.

Occupational therapy interventions for DCD / dyspraxia can include targeting functional daily activities, fine motor skills, motor planning, self-care, school participation, sensory accommodations, keyboarding and written communication, functional pointing for communication, and participation in meaningful occupations. One of the evidence based OT approaches for DCD / dyspraxia is the Cognitive Orientation to daily Occupational Performance (CO-OP) approach, a task-oriented intervention designed to help children develop cognitive and problem-solving strategies for motor tasks that are selected by the child.

Physiotherapy interventions for DCD / dyspraxia often focus on gross motor coordination, balance, gait, postural control, strength, endurance, motor learning, proprioception, and participation in physical activity and sport. Clinical practice guidelines for physical therapists recommend task-oriented motor training, motor skill practice, strength and balance interventions, and physical activity participation as central components of intervention. Neuromotor Task Training may also be used by PTs and OTs.

Research has shown that exercise, adapted physical activity, and sport-based interventions have positive effects on motor function and functional participation in DCD / dyspraxia. Studies have reported improvements in balance, hand-eye coordination, physical fitness, motor coordination with interventions such as aquatic therapy, martial arts, active video gaming, fundamental movement skill programs, balance training, movement-based therapy, and school-based physical activity programs. Evidence for improvement of psychosocial outcomes is less conclusive.

=== Types of therapy ===
The types of occupational and physical therapy for DCD / dyspraxia can be classified according to the primary target of the intervention:

- Activity-oriented and participation-oriented interventions: these target performance or participation in the activity in real world situations; they are called “task-oriented” interventions. Task-oriented interventions focus on teaching movements and motor skills involved in activities of daily living and communication as well as working on the skill gaps in their motor milestone development such as rolling, jumping, ball skills, climbing, reaching and targeted pointing etc., and play or sport-related skill training.
- Body function-oriented interventions: Body function-oriented interventions target body functions needed to perform activities (eg., hand eye coordination); they are sometimes called “process-oriented” interventions. Examples of body function-oriented approaches in DCD / dyspraxia include oculomotor and visuomotor training, biofeedback, balance training, mobility and flexibility training, agility training, strength training, and aerobic fitness training, spatial-orientation training, and proprioceptive training.

Task-oriented approaches have stronger evidence for functional skill improvement than isolated body-function training.

== History ==
In the early twentieth century, Collier described childhood motor coordination difficulties as "congenital maladroitness". In 1972, an occupational therapist named A. Jean Ayres wrote about sensory integration and learning disorders, which contributed to the understanding of sensory and perceptual-motor difficulties in children. Subsequent descriptions included "clumsiness" and "clumsy child syndrome", with Sasson Gubbay publishing research on 'clumsy children' in 1975. The term 'developmental coordination disorder' (DCD / dyspraxia) was introduced in the DSM-III-R in 1987 and endorsed at an international consensus meeting in London, Ontario, in 1994 to standardize the terminology across clinical practice and research. The 2006 Leeds Consensus Statement further clarified the definition and diagnostic criteria for DCD / dyspraxia.

== Society and culture ==
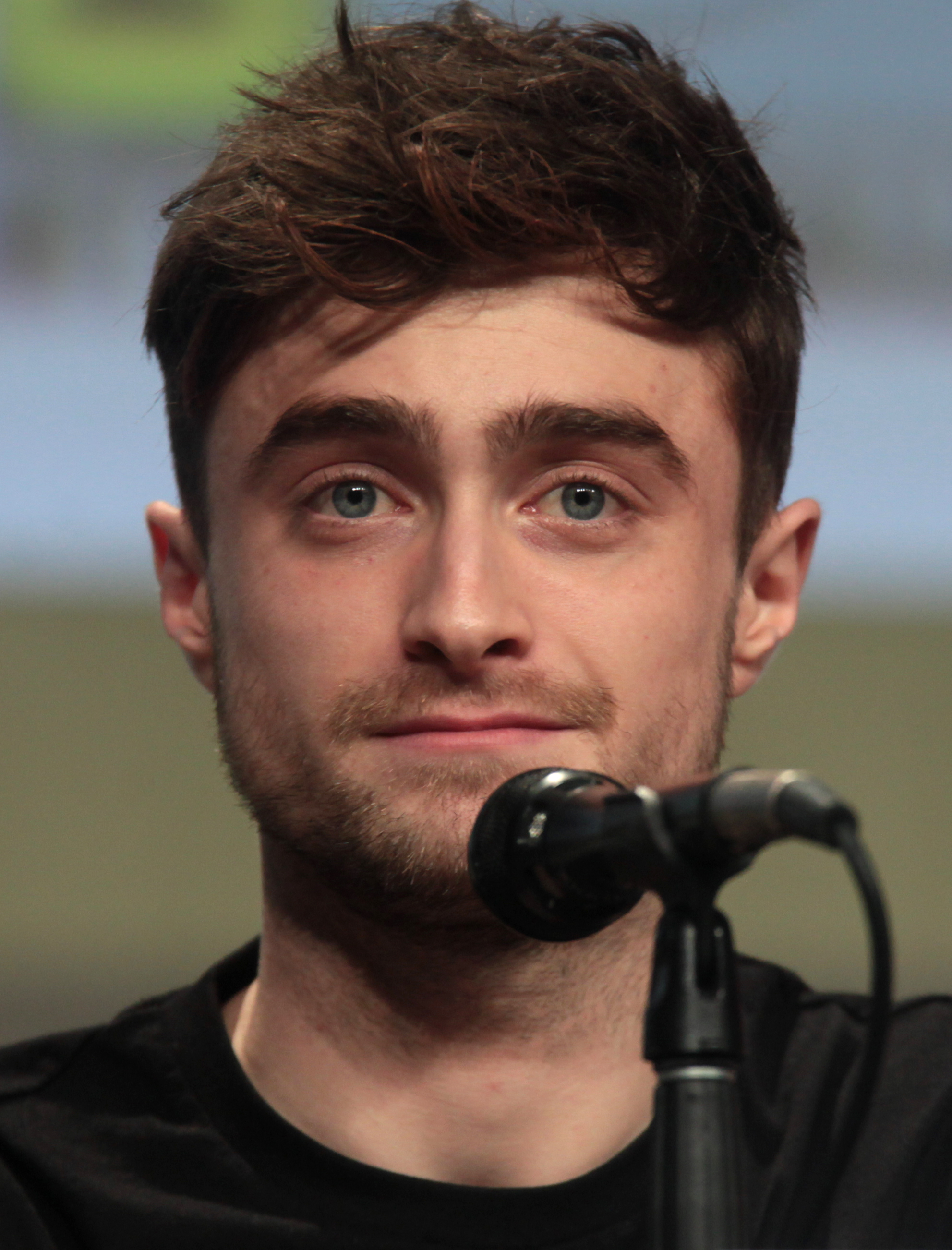
Actor Daniel Radcliffe has dyspraxia.

=== Public figures and notable people ===
People who have publicly stated they have DCD / dyspraxia or related term:

- David Bailey, photographer
- John "TotalBiscuit" Bain, games critic
- Cara Delevingne, model
- Ellis Genge, Rugby Union player
- Tom Hunt, politician
- Gage Golightly, actress
- Olive Gray, actor
- Harriet Kemsley, comedian
- Emma Lewell-Buck, politician
- Mel B, singer
- Will Poulter, actor
- Daniel Radcliffe, actor
- Holly Smale, author
- Florence Welch, singer
- Toyah Willcox, musician

=== Fictional characters ===
- Ryan Sinclair, a character in the BBC science fiction television programme Doctor Who.
- Dr. Tony Hill, a character from the ITV television show Wire in the Blood.

== See also ==
- Autism
- Deficits in attention, motor control and perception
- Fetal alcohol spectrum disorder
- Global developmental delay
- Hypermobility
- Motor control
- Motor coordination
- Childhood apraxia of speech
- Dysgraphia
- Multisensory integration
- Nonverbal learning disorder
- Sensory-motor coupling
- Apraxia
- Attention deficit hyperactivity disorder
