= Diagnostic Classification of Mental Health and Developmental Disorders of Infancy and Early Childhood =

Diagnostic manual

The Diagnostic Classification of Mental Health and Developmental Disorders of Infancy and Early Childhood (DC: 0-5) is a diagnostic manual that provides clinical criteria for categorizing mental health and developmental disorders in infants and toddlers. It is organized into a five-part axis system that includes the following domains: clinical disorders, relational context, medical and developmental conditions, psychosocial stressors, and functional emotional development. The manual has been translated into several languages and is used globally to assess children up to five years of age.

The DC: 0-5 is intended to be used in tandem with the Diagnostic and Statistical Manual of Mental Disorders, Fifth Edition (DSM-5) and the International Classification of Diseases, 11th Revision (ICD-11). It serves to enhance the understanding, assessment, diagnosis, and treatment of mental health problems in young children by addressing the identification of disorders not adequately covered by other classification systems.

Three core principles guide the DC: 0-5:

1) children's psychological functioning develops within relationships,

2) individual differences in temperament and biological vulnerabilities significantly shape their experience, and

3) the family’s cultural context is essential to understanding a child’s developmental trajectory.

Research shows that the DC: 0-5 improves early detection of developmental and emotional issues, allowing for earlier intervention. However, clinicians should be mindful of cultural nuances, especially when using translated versions, to ensure diagnostic accuracy across different populations.

== History ==
The first edition, DC: 0-3, was published in 1994. This version was created to address the need for a systematic approach to the classification of disorders in infancy and early childhood. Used by mental health professionals, physicians, nurses, early educators, and researchers around the world, it has been published in 8 different languages in addition to the original English edition.

=== Current Edition ===
Revisions to the DC: 0-3 were published in 2005 to account for the evolution of the classification system from the time when it was first published in 1994. In 2016, the current edition accounted for over a decade of childhood psychopathology research and clinical experiences. The current edition (DC: 0-5) addresses certain limitations, such as the lack of criteria in some of the classification categories and the need for certain clarifications. Additionally, the current edition emphasizes the importance of relationship quality with regards to childhood behavior and mental health.

== The Diagnostic Process ==
The diagnostic process includes gathering a series of information regarding the child's behavior and presenting problems over some time. The information is collected by a clinician and pertains to the child's adaptation and development across different occasions and contexts.

According to the DC: 0-5, the diagnostic process consists of two aspects: firstly, the classification of disorders, and secondly, the assessment of individuals. One of the primary reasons for the classification of disorders is to facilitate communication between professionals. Once a diagnosis has been made, a clinician can then make associations between their clients’ symptoms and previously existing knowledge regarding the disorders' etiology, pathogenesis, treatment, and prognosis. Furthermore, using the classification of disorders can facilitate the process of finding existing services and mental health systems that are appropriate for the particular needs of the affected child. The assessment of children thus becomes a pivotal process that is undertaken by clinicians to grant access to treatment and intervention services related to specified disorders.

Clinical assessment and diagnosis involve making observations and gathering information from multiple sources relating to the child's life in conjunction with a general diagnostic scheme. Both the DSM and ICD classification systems have evolved to use a multiaxial scheme, thus, clinicians have been using them not only for the classification of disorders but also as a guide for assessment and diagnosis. The first three axes of the DSM and ICD relate to the classification of the disorder, and the fourth and fifth relate to the assessment of the individual within their environment. Similarly, the DC: 0-3 and DC: 0-5 also follow a multiaxial scheme.

=== Classification ===
The DC: 0-5 provides a provisional diagnosis system with a focus on multi-axial classification. The system is provisional because it recognizes the fluidity and change that may occur with more knowledge in the field. This classification system is not entirely synonymous with the DSM-IV and the ICD-10 because it concentrates on developmental issues. There is also an emphasis placed on dynamic processes, relationships, and adaptive patterns within a developmental framework. The use of this classification system imparts knowledge about the diagnostic profile of a child and the various contextual factors that may contribute to difficulties.

The DC: 0-5 functions as a reference for the earlier manifestations of problems in infants and children, which can be connected to later problems in functioning. Additionally, the categorization focuses on types of difficulties in young children that are not addressed in other classification models.

The diagnostic categories vary in the description, and more familiar categories described less. Categories more specific to early childhood and infancy and categories that are developed from more recent clinical approaches are described in more detail. Furthermore, some categories may have subtypes to promote research, clinical awareness, and intervention planning, whereas others do not. This is important information to keep in mind when reading the DC: 0-5.

==== The Multi-Axial System ====
===== Axis I: Clinical Disorders =====
Axis 1 of the DC: 0-5 provides diagnostic classifications for the primary symptoms of the presenting difficulties. These diagnoses focus on the infant or child's functioning. The primary diagnoses include:

- Posttraumatic Stress Disorder: This refers to children who may be experiencing or has experienced a single traumatic event (e.g. an earthquake), a series of traumatic events (e.g. air raids), or chronic stress (e.g. abuse). Furthermore, the nature of the trauma and its effect on the child must be contextually understood. Specifically, attention must be paid to factors such as social context, personality factors, and the caregivers’ ability to assist with coping.
- Disorders of Affect: This classification of disorders is related to the infant or child's affective and behavioral experiences. This group of disorders includes mood disorders and deprivation/maltreatment disorders. This classification focuses on the infant or child's functioning in its entirety rather than a specific event or situation. (See Affective spectrum)
- Adjustment Disorder: When considering a diagnosis of adjustment disorder, one has to examine the situational factors to determine if it is a mild disruption in the child's usual functioning (e.g. switching schools). These difficulties must also not meet the criteria for other disorders included in the categories.
- Regulation Disorders of Sensory Processing: The child manifests difficulties in regulating behavioral, motor, attention, physiological, sensory, and affective processes. These difficulties can affect the child's daily functioning and relationships. (See Sensory processing disorder)
- Sleep Behavior Disorder: To diagnose a sleep disorder, the child should be showing a sleep disturbance and not be demonstrating sensory reactive or processing difficulties. This diagnosis should not be used when sleep problems are related to issues of anxiety or traumatic events.
- Eating Behavior Disorder: This diagnosis may become evident in infancy and young childhood as the child may show difficulties in regular eating patterns. The child may not be regulating feeding with physiological reactions of hunger. This diagnosis is primarily in the absence of traumatic, affective, and regulatory difficulties. (See Eating disorder)
- Disorders of Relating and Communicating: These disorders involve difficulties in communication, in conjunction with difficulties in the regulation of physiological, motor, cognitive, and many other processes.

===== Axis II: Relationship Classification =====
Axis II focuses on children and infants developing in the context of emotional relationships. Specifically, the quality of caregiving can have a strong impact on nurturance and steering a child on a particular developmental course, either adaptive or maladaptive. This particular axis concentrates on the diagnosis of a clinical issue in the relationship between the child and the caregiver. The presence of a disorder indicates difficulties in relationships. These disorders include various patterns that highlight behavior, affective, and psychological factors between the child and the caregiver.

- Over-involved (Overbearing, "Helicopter Parenting")
- Under-involved
- Anxious/Tense
- Angry/Hostile
- Mixed Relationship Disorder
- Abusive

===== Axis III: Medical and Developmental Disorders and Conditions =====
Axis III focuses on physical, mental, or developmental classification using other diagnostic methods. These disorders and conditions are not treated as a single diagnosis, but as a problem that may coexist with others, as it may involve developmental difficulties.

===== Axis IV: Psychosocial Stressors =====
This axis allows clinicians to focus on the intensity of psychosocial stress, which may act as an influencing agent in infant and childhood difficulties/disorders. Psychosocial stress can have direct and indirect influences on infants and children and depends on various factors.

===== Axis V: Emotional and Social Functioning =====
Emotional and social functioning capacities can be assessed using observations of the child with primary caregivers. The essential domains of functioning can be used in these observations on a 5-point scale, that describes the overall functional emotional level.

=== Rating Scales and Checklists ===
The DC: 0-5 contains four forms that aid clinicians in identifying disorders in infants and toddlers, examining the extent of problem behaviors, and in determining the nature of external factors influencing the child.

- Functional Rating Scale for Emotional and Social Functioning Capacities: to evaluate the child's communication skills and expressions of thoughts and feelings.
- The Parent-Infant Relationship Global Assessment Scale (PIR-GAS; from Axis II): to evaluate the quality of a caregiver-child relationship and identify relationship disorders.
- Relationship Problems Checklist (RPCL; from Axis II): allows the clinician to identify the extent to which a caregiver-child relationship can be described by several criterion-based qualities.
- Psychosocial and Environmental Stressors Checklist (from Axis IV): to provide information on the stressors experienced by the child in various contexts.

== The Future of DC: 0-5 ==
Important questions remain relevant despite revisions made in the DC: 0-5. These include the following:

1. How can the functional adaptation of infants and children be evaluated and described independently of diagnosis?
2. How can disruptive behaviors of typical development in infants and children be distinguished from disordered behaviors that leads to a typical development?
3. Should Excessive Crying Disorder be considered a functional regulatory disorder? Other functional regulatory disorders include Sleeping Behavior and Feeding Behavior Disorders.
4. Should future editions of the DC: 0-5 include a Family Axis containing information about family history of mental illness, family structure and available supports, and family culture? These aspects are all central to assessment and treatment planning.
