= Snoezelen =

Form of therapeutic relaxation

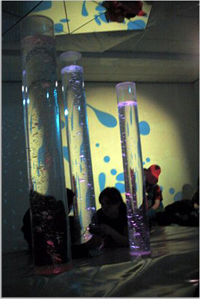
Children in a Snoezelen room

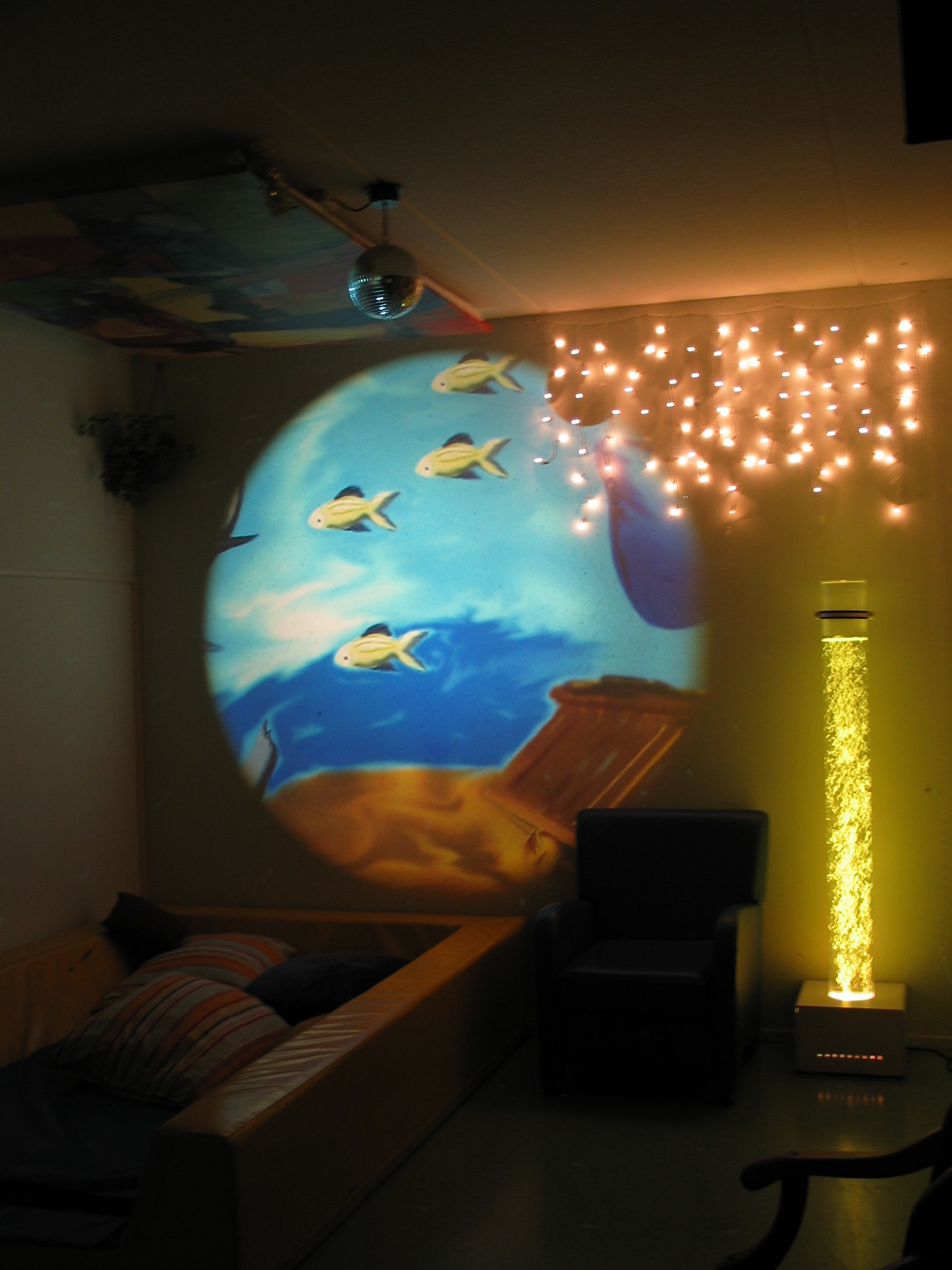
Room for Snoezel therapy in a group home for people with a developmental disability in the Netherlands

Snoezelen (Dutch pronunciation: [ˈsnuzələ(n)]) or controlled multisensory environment (MSE) is a therapy for people with autism and other developmental disabilities, dementia or brain injury. It consists of placing the person in a soothing and stimulating environment, called the "Snoezelen room", a form of sensory room. These rooms are specially designed to deliver stimuli to various senses, using lighting effects, color, sounds, music, scents, etc. The combination of different materials on a wall may be explored using tactile senses, and the floor may be adjusted to stimulate the sense of balance. The person is usually accompanied by an aide or therapist.

Developed in the Netherlands in the 1970s, Snoezelen rooms (snoezelroom) have been established in institutions all over the world and are especially common in Germany, where more than 1,200 exist.

There is no evidence that Snoezelen is effective for the treatment of dementia.

== Term ==
The term Snoezelen is a portmanteau formed from a blend of the Dutch snuffelen ('to snuffle, to sniff') and doezelen ('to doze, snooze').

== Approach ==
Ideally, Snoezelen is a non-directive therapy, controlled by the client and not by the therapist. It can be staged to provide a multi-sensory experience or single sensory focus, simply by adapting the lighting, atmosphere, sounds, and textures to the specific needs of the client at the time of use. There is no formal focus on therapeutic outcome—the focus is to assist users to gain the maximum pleasure from the activity in which they and the enabler are involved. An advantage of Snoezelen therapy is that it does not rely on verbal communication and may be beneficial for people with profound autism, as it may provide stimulation for those who would otherwise be almost impossible to reach.

Snoezelen therapy relates to the interdependence of both the space (the physical environment) and the "client-centered" approach of the practitioner (the human environment). The specially designed sensory physical environment together with the input of the "enabling practitioner" initiates changes in arousal by affecting the relaxation process, reducing anxiety/pain (both physical and emotional). It aims to maximize a person's potential to focus on his own free will and to engage on a motivational stimulus (object, activity or person), and thereby to improve communication and functioning.

The defining principles of the MSE help the practitioner to focus attention on the basic elements of this approach. The following are the principles.

1. The experience takes place in a specific physical environment.
2. The attitude of the practitioners is "client-centered".
3. Stimuli must be controlled according to the client's needs.
4. The MSE is a medium for communication.
5. The sensory environment is neither positive nor negative.
6. The practitioner relies on the client's point of view. (Shapiro, 2010)

== Research ==
Research on the benefits of Snoezelen treatment is scarce, with variable study designs.

A small research study carried out in Brussels compared the behavior of nine adult clients with profound autism in both classroom and Snoezelen settings. Though individual results varied, the study claimed a 50% reduction in distress and stereotypical behavior, and 75% less aggression and self-injury in the Snoezelen environment.

== Usage ==
In 2021, multiple Snoezelen rooms were opened in Portugal. The first Snoezelen was opened to the public in the region of Algarve. It was created by the charity organization Espiral de Vontades which in 2017 started therapeutic treatment for the elderly. Early reception to the room was positive. The next room was created in Póvoa de Santa Iria by the Senior Club. They were testing it for a month before revealing it to the public, and also got good reception from patients. It is being used to calm patients with dementia, and also to release stress from patients as a result of COVID-19 lockdowns.

== See also ==
- Sensory room
- Quiet room, a similar concept used in various buildings
