= Anna Jean Ayres =

American occupational therapist and educational psychologist

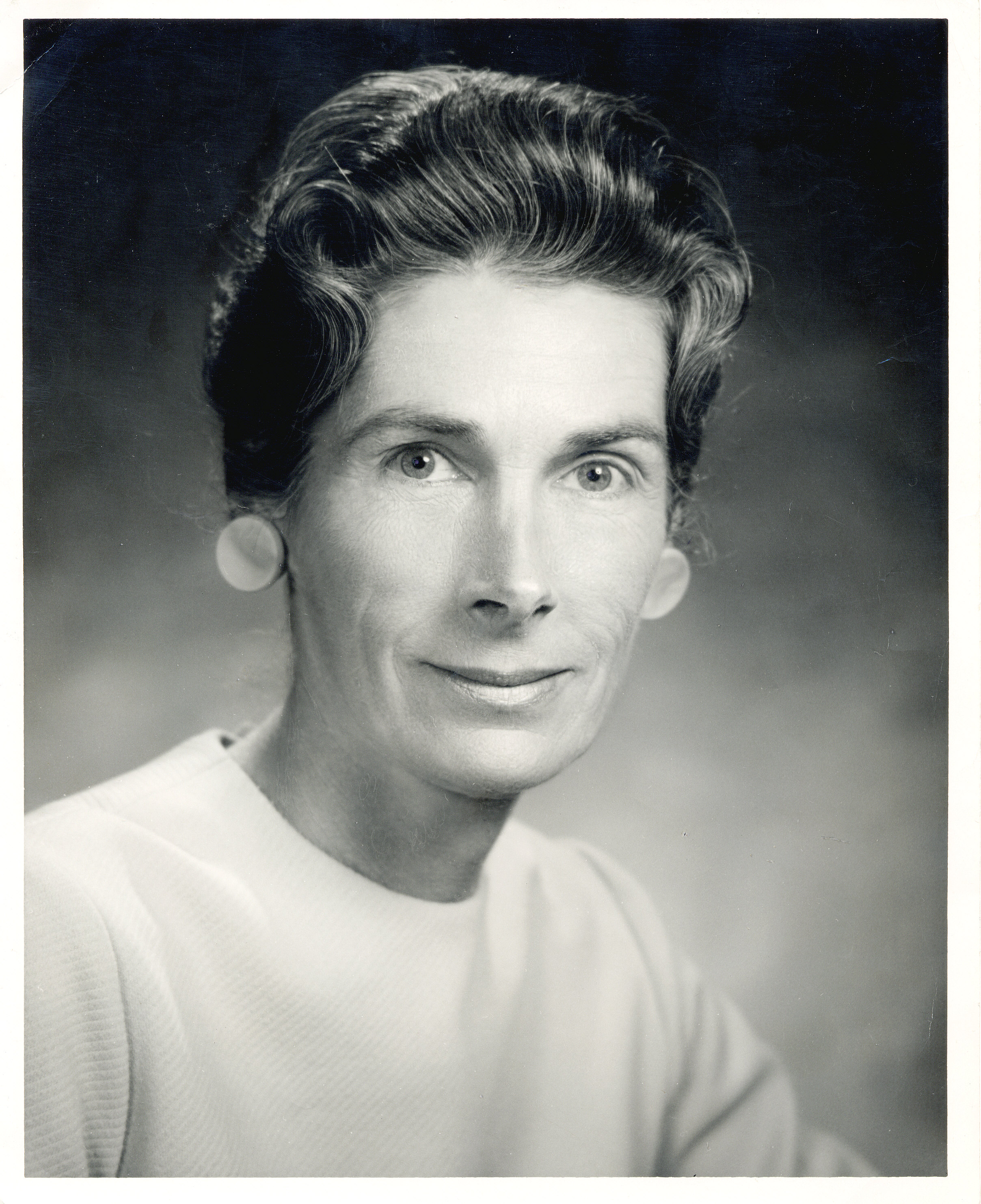
- Born: July 18, 1920; United States of America
- Died: December 16, 1988 (aged 68); Los Angeles
- Education: University of Southern California (BA, MA, PhD)
- Occupations: Developmental Psychologist; Occupational Therapist
- Notable work: Sensory Integration and Learning Disorders (1972)

Anna Jean Ayres (July 18, 1920 – December 16, 1988) was an American occupational therapist, educational psychologist and advocate for individuals with special needs. She became known for her work on sensory integration (SI) theory.

== Education ==
Ayres was born on a walnut farm in Visalia, California, in 1920. Her parents, Fletcher and Louise (Stamm) Ayres, were both school teachers. Growing up, Ayres claimed to have symptoms similar to the dysfunctions she would later study. Ayres received her B.A. in occupational therapy in 1945, her M.A. in occupational therapy in 1954, and her PhD in educational psychology in 1961, all from the University of Southern California in Los Angeles. She began her post-doctoral work in the UCLA Brain Research Institute from 1964 to 1966 under Arthur Parmelee. She was also a faculty member in the occupational therapy and special education departments at the University of Southern California from 1955 to 1984.

Ayres wrote two books and more than thirty journal articles. In 1975 she standardized tests originally known as the Southern California Sensory Integration Tests and later revised the Sensory Integration and Praxis Tests in 1989.

In 1976, Ayres founded a private pediatric practice called the Ayres Clinic in Torrance, California, where she conducted occupational therapy assessment and intervention on children and adults with a variety of disorders, including learning disabilities and autism.

== Development of Sensory Integration theory ==
=== Sensory Integration Dysfunction ===
Building on the work of Charles S. Sherrington and others, she began developing the theory and associated intervention techniques of sensory integration in the 1950s by examining the relationship between the brain and behavior. By the 1960s, Ayres recognized and described "hidden disabilities" or "dysfunction in sensory integrative processes" (Ayres, 1963, 1968), which she later referred to as sensory integrative dysfunction. She originated the theory to "explain the relationship between deficits in interpreting sensation from the body and the environment and difficulties with academic or motor learning." Between 1968 and 1989, Ayres used tests of sensory integrative and practical functions with children with and without learning and sensorimotor difficulties. These were originally published as "Southern California Sensory Integration Tests" (SCSIT; 1975) and later revised as "Sensory Integration and Praxis Tests (SIPT; 1989). She published numerous factor analyses of assessment findings that allowed her to identify patterns of sensory integrative dysfunction, which were later confirmed by other researchers and expanded upon (e.g. in the context of attention deficit and hyperactivity disorder).

=== Sensory Integration ===
"Sensory integration theory is used to explain why individuals behave in particular ways, plan intervention to ameliorate particular difficulties, and predict how behavior will change as a result of intervention" (p. 5). Dr Ayres defined sensory integration as "the organization of sensations for use. Our senses give us information about the physical conditions of our body and the environment around us ... The brain must organize all of our sensations if a person is to move and learn and behave in a productive manner" (p. 5).

Ayres published her definition of "sensory integration" in 1972 as the neurological process that organizes sensation from one's own body and from the environment and makes it possible to use the body effectively within the environment (p. 11). In 1979, Ayres published Sensory Integration and the Child, a book to "help parents to recognize sensory integrative problems in their child, understand what is going on, and do something to help their child"

=== Sensory Integration Therapy ===
As an intervention approach, Sensory integration therapy is used as "a clinical frame of reference for the assessment and treatment of people who have functional disorders in sensory processing" (p. 325). Ayres considered sensory integration intervention "a specialty of occupational therapy" (Ayres 1979, p. 155). Thus, the assessment and intervention from a sensory integration perspective are most commonly used by occupational therapy practitioners in their treatment of children with difficulties in occupational performance and participation related to sensory integrative or sensory processing dysfunction.

She developed the intervention approach through empirical research. However, the effectiveness of this therapy have come into serious question more recently. Many recent studies have not supported the effectiveness of the therapy, and studies that do support the effectiveness of the therapy have been found to have "serious methodological flaws." Many professionals hold that Ayres created one of the first structures for evidence-based practice in occupational therapy through her theory development (Ayres, 1972), model development (Ayres, 1979–2005), assessment development (Ayres, 1989) and intervention strategies (Ayres, 1972).

Sensory integration theory and practice has been met with resistance within the occupational therapy profession as well as other disciplines. A recent review concluded that SIT is "ineffective and that its theoretical underpinnings and assessment practices are unvalidated." Moreover, the authors warned that SIT techniques exist "outside the bounds of established evidence-based practice" and that SIT is "quite possible a misuse of limited resources." These findings corroborate the findings of other studies and reviews on the effectiveness of Sensory Integration Therapy.

== Awards and recognition ==
Ayres received numerous honors from the American Occupational Therapy Association (AOTA) including the Eleanor Clarke Slagle Lectureship in 1963 and the Award of Merit in 1965. She was a charter member of the Academy of Research of the American Occupational Therapy Foundation (AOTF) in 1983. The A. Jean Ayres Award for theory development and application was created by the AOTF in 1988.

She has been described by her students and colleagues as "a pioneer in affective neuroscience" (Schneider, 2005), a "developmental theorist" (Knox, 2005), "one of the original perceptual motor theorists" (Smith Roley, 2005), "a pioneer in our understanding of developmental dyspraxia" (Cermak, 2005), and "an astute observer of human behavior and neurological development" (Bauman, 2005).

Ayres was dedicated to the promotion of science-driven intervention strategies leading a better quality of life for people with disabilities and their families. "Her work made major inroads into the understanding of clinical neuroscience, the importance of experience in brain development, the role of tactile defensiveness and sensory modulation disorders as contributors to behavioral disorders, and the impact of sensory registration in autism, among others."

If I have been productive, it is partly because I have had the advantage of contact with those with the courage as well as the ability to think independently and along unorthodox lines. It has not been easy for the helping professions to conceive of human behavior as an express of the brain, and they are still struggling to do so ... The employing of neural mechanisms to enhance motor development is now well established; the current area of major growth and controversy lies in the use of neurological constructs to aid in understanding and ameliorating cognitive functions such as learning disabilities; the next step may well be a more fruitful attack on emotional and behavior disorders.

— Jean Ayres (1974, p. xi)

== Death ==
Ayres died from complications of breast cancer on December 16, 1988.

== Bibliography ==
- Ayres A. J. (1954). Ontogenetic principles in the development of arm and hand functions. Am. J. Occup. Ther. 8, 95–99, 121.
- Ayres A. J. (1958). The visual-motor function. Am. J. Occup. Ther. 12, 130–138, 155.
- Ayres A. J. (1961). Development of the body scheme in children. Am. J. Occup. Ther. 15, 99–102, 128.
- Ayres A. J. (1963). The development of perceptual-motor abilities: a theoretical basis for treatment of dysfunction. Am. J. Occup. Ther. 27, 221–225.
- Ayres A. J. (1965). Patterns of perceptual-motor dysfunction in children: a factor analytic study. Percept. Mot. Skills 20, 335–368.
- Ayres A. J. (1966). Interrelation of perception, function, and treatment. J. Am. Phys. Ther. Assoc. 46, 741–744.
- Ayres A. J. (1966). Interrelations among perceptual-motor abilities in a group of normal children. Am. J. Occup. Ther. 20, 288–292.
- Ayres, A. J. (1968). Sensory integrative processes and neuropsychological learning disability. Learning Disorders, 3, 41–58.
- Ayres, A. Jean (1970). Sensory Integration and the Child. Western Psychological Services. ISBN 0-87424-437-4.
- Ayres, A. J. (1971). Characteristics of types of sensory integrative dysfunction. American Journal of Occupational Therapy, 25, 329–334.
- Ayres A. J. (1972). Overview. In Sensory Integration and Learning Disorders, Ayres A. J., ed. (Los Angeles, CA, Western Psychological Services; ), pp. 1–12.
- Ayres A. J. (1972). Sensory Integration and Learning Disorders. Los Angeles, CA, Western Psychological Services.
- Ayres A. J. (1972). Some general principles of brain function. In Sensory Integration and Learning Disorders, Ayres A. J., ed. (Los Angeles, CA, Western Psychological Services; ), pp. 13–24
- Ayres, A. J. (1972). Types of sensory integrative dysfunction among disabled learners. American Journal of Occupational Therapy, 26, 13–18.
- Ayres, A. Jean (1973). Sensory Integration and Learning Disorders. Western Psychological Services. ISBN 0-87424-303-3.
- Ayres, A. Jean (1974). The Development of Sensory Integrative Theory and Practice: A Collection of the Works of A. Jean Ayres. Kendall/Hunt Pub Co. ISBN 0-8403-0971-6.
- Ayres A. J. (1975). Sensorimotor foundations of academic ability. In Perceptual and Learning Disabilities in Children, Cruickshank W. M., Hallahan D. P., eds (Syracuse, NY, Syracuse University Press; ), pp. 301–358.
- Ayres, A. J., & Tickle, L. S. (1980). Hyper-responsivity to touch and vestibular stimuli as a predictor of positive response to sensory integration procedures by autistic children. American Journal of Occupational Therapy, 34, 375–381.
- Ayres, A. J. (1989). Sensory integration and praxis tests. Los Angeles, CA: Western Psychological Services.
- Ayres, A. J. (2004). Sensory integration and praxis tests manual: Updated edition. Los Angeles, CA: Western Psychological Services.
- Ayres, A. Jean; Erwin, Philip R.; Mailloux, Zoe (2004). Love, Jean: Inspiration for Families Living With Dysfunction of Sensory Integration. Crestport Press. ISBN 0-9725098-1-X. (posthumous collection of correspondence)

== See also ==
- Occupational therapy
- Sensory processing disorder
- Sensory integration
