= Specific developmental disorder =

- Specialty: Psychiatry

Specific developmental disorders (SDD) was a classification of disorders characterized by delayed development in one specific area or areas. Specific developmental disorders were contrasted to pervasive developmental disorders, which were characterized by delays in the development of multiple basic functions, including socialization and communication.

== ICD-10 taxonomy ==
The tenth revision of the International Statistical Classification of Diseases and Related Health Problems (ICD-10) has four categories of developmental disorders: specific developmental disorders of speech and language, specific developmental disorders of scholastic skills, specific developmental disorder of motor function, and mixed specific developmental disorder.

== DSM-III taxonomy ==
In the third edition of the Diagnostic and Statistical Manual of Mental Disorders (DSM-III), SDD was opposed to the pervasive developmental disorders (PDD). There were two factors that were considered:

- The specificity of the impairment: in SDD there is one single domain that is affected, whereas in PDD multiple areas of functioning are affected.
- The nature of the impairment: development in SDD is delayed but not otherwise abnormal, whereas in PDD there are behavioral deviations that are not typical for any developmental stage.

In the DSM-IV, specific developmental disorders were no longer grouped together. Instead they were reclassified as communication disorders, learning disorders, and motor skills disorders.

== Comparison and conditions ==
ICD-10	DSM-IV-TR	ICD-11
Specific developmental disorders of speech and language (F80): Specific speech articulation disorder (F80.0); Expressive language disorder (F80.1); Receptive language disorder (F80.2); Acquired aphasia with epilepsy Landau–Kleffner syndrome (F80.3); Other developmental disorders of speech and language (F80.8); Developmental disorder of speech and language, unspecified (F80.9)	Communication disorders: Expressive Language Disorder (315.31); Mixed receptive-expressive language disorder (315.32); Phonological Disorder (315.39); Stuttering (307.0); Communication Disorder Not Otherwise Specified (307.9)	Developmental Speech & Language Disorders (6A01): Developmental speech sound disorder (6A01.0); Developmental speech fluency disorder (6A01.1); Developmental language disorder (6A01.2); Developmental language disorder with impairment of receptive and expressive language (6A01.20); Developmental language disorder with impairment of mainly expressive language (6A01.21); Developmental language disorder with impairment of mainly pragmatic language (6A01.22); Developmental language disorder, with other specified language impairment (6A01.23); Other specified developmental speech or language disorders (6A01.Y); Developmental speech or language disorders, unspecified (6A01.Z)
Specific developmental disorders of scholastic skills (F81): Specific reading disorder (F81.0); Specific spelling disorder (F81.1); Specific disorder of arithmetical skills (F81.2); Mixed disorder of scholastic skills (F81.3); Other disorders of scholastic skills (F81.8); Developmental disorder of scholastic skills, unspecified (F81.9)	Learning disorders: Reading Disorder (315.0); Mathematics Disorder (315.1); Disorder of Written Expression (315.2); Learning Disorder Not Otherwise Specified (315.9)	Developmental learning disorder (6A03): Developmental learning disorder with impairment in reading (6A03.0); Developmental learning disorder with impairment in written expression (6A03.1); Developmental learning disorder with impairment in mathematics (6A03.2); Developmental learning disorder with other specified impairment of learning (6A03.3); Developmental learning disorder, unspecified (6A03.Z)
Specific developmental disorder of motor function (F82)	Motor skills disorders: Developmental coordination disorder (315.4)	Developmental motor coordination disorder (6A04)
Mixed specific developmental disorder (F83)		

== See also ==
- Developmental disability
- Global developmental delay
