= Elena Ragozhina =

- Born: Elena Konstantinovna Ragozhina; 14 October 1957 (age 68); Moscow, Soviet Union (now Russia)
- Died: 4 March 2014; London
- Education: Moscow State Automobile and Road Technical University(MADI)
- Occupation: Publisher

Elena Konstantinovna Ragozhina (Russian: Eлена Константиновна Рагожина; (14 October 1957 – 2 March 2014) was a Moscow-born publisher, head of Russian Media House, director of charitable foundation Chance for Life.

== Biography ==
Elena Ragozhina was born in Moscow on 14 October 1957. In 1974, she finished Moscow School No. 3, a German-language specialist school (now School No. 1249). In 1979, she graduated with honours from the Moscow State Automobile and Road Technical University with a degree in Engineering Design. In 1979–1988, she worked as a researcher at the All-Union Research Institute for Construction and Road Machinery. In 1995–2000, she taught Economics at MADI; in 1998 she defended her thesis entitled "Economic Demand Chain Management Methods – the Use of New Technology", and was awarded her PhD in Economics (Candidate of Economic Sciences). Ragozhina died in London on 4 March 2014.

== Great Britain ==
In 2000, she moved with her family to Britain. She became the co-owner of a Russian-language newspaper, which she sold two years later. In 2003, she began publishing the monthly magazine, New Style, a Russian-language publication partly in English (the magazine was originally published under the title Lady Info and renamed in 2004), and in 2005, she began publishing the weekly newspaper Pulse UK. As a publisher, she has hosted annual events which have been attended by all of London's high-profile Russian-speaking residents. Her guests have included numerous famous people who have given interviews to New Style Magazine. Over the past 10 years more than 500 interviews by Elena Ragozhina have been published.

== Philanthropy ==
In 2005–2009, she was a director of Diema’s Dream, a London-based charitable foundation set up by Mary Dudley to provide support for orphaned children with physical and learning difficulties. In 2009, she co-founded the Chance for Life charitable foundation with her colleague Olga Makharinskaya. In recent years she has worked closely with the Maria’s Children Center in Moscow, an arts rehabilitation centre founded by the artist Maria Yeliseyeva, bringing together around 300 children from several Moscow children's homes and correctional boarding schools with various learning difficulties, including developmental delays and cerebral palsy. For eight years she has put on charitable balls and the funds (over £400,000) raised at auctions during these events have been used for rehabilitation and educational programmes for orphaned children.

== Publications ==
Featured interviews:

- Kaas chante Piaf
- Naomie Harris – 21st century Bond girl
- The Road to Fame: Miss London Amy Willerton
- Biographer of Jerusalem: Simon Sebag Montefiore
- I am very proud that I am a Romanov
- Ian Paice: Deep Purple’s legendary drummer
- Love and Children: Natalia Vodianova’s London Ball
- Jeff Fahey: «The door is open for anyone»
- Raymond Blanc – England’s celebrated Frenchman
- Colorful world of Matthew Williamson
- Perfume haute couture: Roja Dove
- Arnaud Bamberger – 33 years with Cartier
- Dmitry Khvorostovsky: best baritone of the age
- Yuri Bashmet: You must have charisma on stage
- From new names to Crescendo: Denis Matsuev
- Duchess of Abercorn and other Pushkin descendants
- Lord Giddens on climate change, politicians, and corruption

Mention in the British press:

- Independent "The arrival of the east European media"
- The World: Insider's view – Russia
- Daily Telegraph "When silence is golden"
- Daily Telegraph "Ruthless, stylish and rich, but what emigrés hire first is a bodyguard"
