= Aide et Action International South Asia =

Nonprofit organization in India

Aide et Action International South Asia is a nonprofit organization in India that provides support to local actors for the implementation of their projects on diverse programs related to education, early childhood care, and education, Livelihood Education for excluded youth from poor and marginalized sections, health, environment, social cohesion, the inclusion of the girl child. The Aide et Action Network discloses the use of funds received by its sponsors, donors, and partners, by publishing its financial statements each year, accessible to all on the Internet.

== History ==
Aide et Action was established in France in 1981 by Pierre-Bernard Le Bas. India was its first country program. In 2007, Aide et Action transformed into Aide et Action International. In 2010, Aide et Action South Asia evolved along with Aide et Action Africa (2010) followed by Aide et Action South East Asia and Latin America-Caribbean (2011). The Aide et Action South Asia operates in India, Sri Lanka, Nepal, and Bhutan with its Head Office located in Chennai and supported by 9 sub-regional offices in Bhopal, Chennai, Delhi, Guwahati, Hyderabad, Jaipur, Patna, Katmandu, and Colombo. Aide et Action South Asia implements 39 projects, along with the support of institutions, government, and individual sponsors. Through its 39 projects, Aide et Action South Asia contributes to the improvement of the access and quality of education for nearly 7,31,000 children and adults. 72 employees and 250 project staff across the South Asia region take part in implementing its educational mission.

== The nine thematic interventions ==
1. Access and Quality Education
2. Early Childhood Care & Education(all activities that promote the development of the child from 0–6 years)
3. Women's Empowerment & Education
4. Inclusive education
5. Education for Global Citizenship
6. Livelihood education
7. Health Education
8. Education for Migrating population
9. Disaster Response, Mitigation, and Preparedness

== Achievements ==
The education for Tribal Girls in Odisha, an initiative of Aide et Action, has been selected as one of the best practices by the United Nations Girl Education Initiative in 2014. The project has been selected for the best practices adopted to arrest school drop-outs rates in the area.

Aide et Action played an active role in developing customized social protection products and services for Internal migrants in India.

iLEAD (Initiative for Livelihood Education and Development) is a flagship program of Aide et Action which has provided livelihood education to 1, 33, 487 youth out of which 75% of whom have been placed.
