= DSM-5 =

2013 edition of the Diagnostic and Statistical Manual of Mental Disorders

Diagnostic and Statistical Manual of Mental Disorders, Fifth Edition
- Author: American Psychiatric Association
- Language: English
- Series: Diagnostic and Statistical Manual of Mental Disorders
- Subject: Classification and diagnosis of mental disorders
- Publication date: May 18, 2013
- Publication place: United States
- Media type: Print (hardcover, softcover); eBook
- Pages: 947
- ISBN: 978-0-89042-554-1
- OCLC: 830807378
- Dewey Decimal: 616.89'075
- LC Class: RC455.2.C4
- Preceded by: DSM-IV-TR
- Followed by: DSM-5-TR
- Text: Diagnostic and Statistical Manual of Mental Disorders, Fifth Edition at Internet Archive

The Diagnostic and Statistical Manual of Mental Disorders, Fifth Edition (DSM-5), is the 2013 update to the Diagnostic and Statistical Manual of Mental Disorders, the taxonomic and diagnostic tool published by the American Psychiatric Association (APA). In 2022, a revised version (DSM-5-TR) was published. In the United States, the DSM serves as the principal authority for psychiatric diagnoses. Treatment recommendations, as well as payment by health insurance companies, are often determined by DSM classifications, so the appearance of a new version has practical importance. However, some providers instead rely on the International Classification of Diseases (ICD), and scientific studies often measure changes in symptom scale scores rather than changes in DSM-5 criteria to determine the real-world effects of mental health interventions. The DSM-5 is the only DSM to use an Arabic numeral instead of a Roman numeral in its title, (Note: However, it was called the DSM-V while under development.) as well as the only living document version of a DSM.

The DSM-5 is not a major revision of the DSM-IV-TR, but the two have significant differences. Changes in the DSM-5 include the re-conceptualization of Asperger syndrome from a distinct disorder to an autism spectrum disorder; the elimination of subtypes of schizophrenia; the deletion of the "bereavement exclusion" for depressive disorders; the renaming and reconceptualization of gender identity disorder to gender dysphoria; the inclusion of binge eating disorder as a discrete eating disorder; the renaming and reconceptualization of paraphilias, now called paraphilic disorders; the removal of the five-axis system; and the splitting of disorders not otherwise specified into other specified disorders and unspecified disorders.

Many authorities criticized the fifth edition both before and after it was published. Critics assert, for example, that many DSM-5 revisions or additions lack empirical support; that inter-rater reliability is low for many disorders; that several sections contain poorly written, confusing, or contradictory information; and that the pharmaceutical industry may have unduly influenced the manual's content, given the industry association of many DSM-5 workgroup participants. The APA itself has published that the inter-rater reliability is low for many disorders, including major depressive disorder and generalized anxiety disorder.

== Content and structure ==
The DSM-5 is divided into three sections, using Roman numerals to designate each section.

=== Section I: DSM-5 basics ===
Section I describes DSM-5 chapter organization, its change from the multiaxial system, and Section III's dimensional assessments. The DSM-5 dissolved the chapter that includes "disorders usually first diagnosed in infancy, childhood, or adolescence" opting to list them in other chapters. A note under Anxiety Disorders says that the "sequential order" of at least some DSM-5 chapters has significance that reflects the relationships between diagnoses.

The introductory section describes the process of DSM revision, including field trials, public and professional review, and expert review. It states its goal is to harmonize with the International Classification of Diseases (ICD) systems and share organizational structures as much as is feasible. Concern about the categorical system of diagnosis is expressed, but the conclusion is the reality that alternative definitions for most disorders are scientifically premature.

=== Section II: Diagnostic criteria and codes ===
Section II contains chapters describing types of mental disorders, such as dissociative, neurodevelopmental, and personality disorders. The chapters begin with a description of the group of disorders in question, followed by the specific diagnoses, such as dissociative identity disorder or autism spectrum disorder. For each disorder, a set of diagnostic criteria is presented, followed by descriptions regarding things such as of diagnostic features and prevalence, as well as a list of other disorders to consider for a differential diagnosis, along with descriptions of the differences between these.

=== Section III: Emerging measures and models ===
Section III includes dimensional measures for the assessment of symptoms, criteria for the cultural formulation of disorders and the Alternative DSM-5 Model for Personality Disorders – a hybrid-dimensional-categorical model of personality disorders, as well as a description of the currently studied clinical conditions. It presents selected tools and research techniques focused on diagnosis, taking into account the sociocultural context.

==== Alternative DSM-5 Model for Personality Disorders ====
The Alternative DSM-5 Model for Personality Disorders (AMPD), introduced in Section III of the Diagnostic and Statistical Manual of Mental Disorders, Fifth Edition (DSM-5), is a dimensional–categorical hybrid model of personality disorders, meaning that it integrates a dimensional model of personality disorders with a categorical one. This is achieved through mapping of individual, categorical personality disorders to specific combinations of impairment in personality functioning and pathological personality traits.

The alternative model features the following specific personality disorders: antisocial, avoidant, borderline, narcissistic, obsessive–compulsive, and schizotypal, constituting a reduction of entities, as the standard model contains the diagnoses of dependent, histrionic, paranoid, and schizoid personality disorders in addition to those in the AMPD. It also contains a trait specified diagnosis for manifestations of personality disorder not covered by the specific diagnoses, such as the four omitted categories.

Designed to address limitations of the categorical classification of personality disorders – such as heterogeneous PD categories, excessive comorbidity, arbitrary thresholds and insufficient diagnostic precision – the AMPD has generally been found to hold validity; however, it remains subject to ongoing debate and research in regards to aspects such as the relationship between traits and functioning level.

==== Conditions for further study ====
These conditions and criteria are set forth to encourage future research and are not meant for clinical use. This chapter includes the following conditions:

- Attenuated psychosis syndrome
- Depressive episodes with short-duration hypomania
- Persistent complex bereavement disorder
- Caffeine use disorder
- Internet gaming disorder
- Neurobehavioral disorder associated with prenatal alcohol exposure
- Suicidal behavior disorder
- Non-suicidal self-injury

== Changes from DSM-IV ==
DSM-5 replaces the Not Otherwise Specified (NOS) categories with two options: other specified disorder and unspecified disorder to increase the utility to the clinician. The first allows the clinician to specify the reason that the criteria for a specific disorder are not met; the second allows the clinician the option to forgo specification.

DSM-5 has discarded the multiaxial system of diagnosis (formerly Axis I, Axis II, Axis III), listing all disorders in Section II. It has replaced Axis IV with significant psychosocial and contextual features and dropped Axis V (Global Assessment of Functioning, known as GAF). The World Health Organization's Disability Assessment Schedule is added to Section III (Emerging measures and models) under Assessment Measures, as a suggested, but not required, method to assess functioning.

=== Changes made to disorders ===
==== Neurodevelopmental disorders ====
- "Mental retardation" was renamed "intellectual disability (intellectual developmental disorder)".
- Speech or language disorders are now called communication disorders—which include language disorder (formerly expressive language disorder and mixed receptive-expressive language disorder), speech sound disorder (formerly phonological disorder), childhood-onset fluency disorder (stuttering), and a new condition characterized by impaired social verbal and nonverbal communication called social (pragmatic) communication disorder.
- Autism spectrum disorder (ASD) is a new diagnosis that incorporates the former diagnoses of classic autism, Asperger disorder, childhood disintegrative disorder, and pervasive developmental disorder not otherwise specified (PDD-NOS). The DSM-5 organizes the symptoms of ASD into two groups: impaired social communication and/or interaction, and restricted and/or repetitive behaviors. The DSM-5 assigns three "severity levels" for ASD, with people in level 1 "requiring support", level 2 "requiring substantial support", and level 3 "requiring very substantial support". The updated classification under ASD reflects a dimensional approach, allowing clinicians to rate symptom severity instead of fitting patients into narrowly defined categories. This change also aimed to simplify diagnosis and improve access to services.
- Attention deficit hyperactivity disorder (ADHD) no longer specifies autism as an exclusionary diagnosis. The requisite age of symptom onset was changed from 7 years old to 12 years old, and symptom thresholds were reduced for diagnosis of ADHD as an adolescent or adult.
- "Specific Learning Disorder" encompasses shortcomings in academic skill development, including dyslexia and dyscalculia.
- A new sub-category, motor disorders, encompasses developmental coordination disorder, stereotypic movement disorder, and the tic disorders including Tourette syndrome.

==== Schizophrenia spectrum and other psychotic disorders ====
- All subtypes of schizophrenia (paranoid, disorganized, catatonic, undifferentiated, and residual) were removed from the DSM-5 in favor of a severity-based rating approach.
- A major mood episode is required for schizoaffective disorder (for a majority of the disorder's duration after criterion A [related to delusions, hallucinations, disorganized speech or behavior, and negative symptoms such as avolition] is met).
- Criteria for delusional disorder changed, and it is no longer separate from shared delusional disorder.
- Catatonia in all contexts requires 3 of a total of 12 symptoms. Catatonia may be a specifier for depressive, bipolar, and psychotic disorders; part of another medical condition; or of another specified diagnosis.

==== Bipolar and related disorders ====
- New specifier "with mixed features" can be applied to bipolar I disorder, bipolar II disorder, bipolar disorder NED (not elsewhere defined, previously called "NOS", not otherwise specified) and MDD.
- Allows other specified bipolar and related disorder for particular conditions.
- Anxiety symptoms are a specifier (called "anxious distress") added to bipolar disorder and to depressive disorders (but are not part of the bipolar diagnostic criteria).

==== Depressive disorders ====
- The bereavement exclusion in DSM-IV was removed from depressive disorders in DSM-5.
- New disruptive mood dysregulation disorder (DMDD) for children up to age 18 years.
- Premenstrual dysphoric disorder moved from an appendix for further study, and became a disorder.
- Specifiers were added for mixed symptoms and for anxiety, along with guidance to physicians for suicidality.
- The term dysthymia now also would be called persistent depressive disorder.

==== Anxiety disorders ====
- For the various forms of phobias and anxiety disorders, DSM-5 removes the requirement that the subject (formerly, over 18 years old) "must recognize that their fear and anxiety are excessive or unreasonable". Also, the duration of at least 6 months now applies to everyone (not only to children).
- Panic attack became a specifier for all DSM-5 disorders.
- Panic disorder and agoraphobia became two separate disorders.
- Specific types of phobias became specifiers but are otherwise unchanged.
- The generalized specifier for social anxiety disorder (formerly, social phobia) changed in favor of a performance only (i.e., public speaking or performance) specifier.
- Separation anxiety disorder and selective mutism are now classified as anxiety disorders (rather than disorders of early onset).

==== Obsessive-compulsive and related disorders ====
- A new chapter on obsessive-compulsive and related disorders includes four new disorders: excoriation (skin-picking) disorder, hoarding disorder, substance-/medication-induced obsessive-compulsive and related disorder, and obsessive-compulsive and related disorder due to another medical condition.
- Trichotillomania (hair-pulling disorder) moved from "impulse-control disorders not elsewhere classified" in DSM-IV, to an obsessive-compulsive disorder in DSM-5.
- A specifier was expanded (and added to body dysmorphic disorder and hoarding disorder) to allow for good or fair insight, poor insight, and "absent insight/delusional" (i.e., complete conviction that obsessive-compulsive disorder beliefs are true).
- Criteria were added to body dysmorphic disorder to describe repetitive behaviors or mental acts that may arise with perceived defects or flaws in physical appearance.
- The DSM-IV specifier "with obsessive-compulsive symptoms" moved from anxiety disorders to this new category for obsessive-compulsive and related disorders.
- There are two new diagnoses: other specified obsessive-compulsive and related disorder, which can include body-focused repetitive behavior disorder (behaviors like nail biting, lip biting, and cheek chewing, other than hair pulling and skin picking) or obsessional jealousy; and unspecified obsessive-compulsive and related disorder.

==== Trauma- and stressor-related disorders ====
- Post traumatic stress disorder (PTSD) is now included in a new section titled "Trauma- and Stressor-Related Disorders."
- The PTSD diagnostic clusters were reorganized and expanded from a total of three clusters to four based on the results of confirmatory factor analytic research conducted since the publication of DSM-IV.
- Separate criteria were added for children six years old or younger.
- For the diagnosis of acute stress disorder and PTSD, the stressor criteria (Criterion A1 in DSM-IV) was modified to some extent. The requirement for specific subjective emotional reactions (Criterion A2 in DSM-IV) was eliminated because it lacked empirical support for its utility and predictive validity. Previously certain groups, such as military personnel involved in combat, law enforcement officers and other first responders, did not meet criterion A2 in DSM-IV because their training prepared them to not react emotionally to traumatic events.
- Two new disorders that were formerly subtypes were named: reactive attachment disorder and disinhibited social engagement disorder.
- Adjustment disorders were moved to this new section and reconceptualized as stress-response syndromes. DSM-IV subtypes for depressed mood, anxious symptoms, and disturbed conduct are unchanged.

==== Dissociative disorders ====
- Depersonalization disorder is now called depersonalization derealization disorder.
- Dissociative fugue became a specifier for dissociative amnesia.
- The criteria for dissociative identity disorder were expanded to include "possession-form phenomena and functional neurological symptoms". It is made clear that "transitions in identity may be observable by others or self-reported". Criterion B was also modified for people who experience gaps in recall of everyday events (not only trauma).

==== Somatic symptom and related disorders ====
- Somatoform disorders are now called somatic symptom and related disorders.
- Patients that present with chronic pain can now be diagnosed with the mental illness somatic symptom disorder with predominant pain; or psychological factors that affect other medical conditions; or with an adjustment disorder.
- Somatization disorder and undifferentiated somatoform disorder were combined to become somatic symptom disorder, a diagnosis which no longer requires a specific number of somatic symptoms.
- Somatic symptom and related disorders are defined by positive symptoms, and the use of medically unexplained symptoms is minimized, except in the cases of conversion disorder and pseudocyesis (false pregnancy).
- A new diagnosis is psychological factors affecting other medical conditions. This was formerly found in the DSM-IV chapter "Other Conditions That May Be a Focus of Clinical Attention".
- Criteria for conversion disorder (functional neurological symptom disorder) were changed.

==== Feeding and eating disorders ====
- Criteria for pica and rumination disorder were changed and can now refer to people of any age.
- Binge eating disorder graduated from DSM-IV's "Appendix B -- Criteria Sets and Axes Provided for Further Study" into a proper diagnosis.
- Requirements for bulimia nervosa and binge eating disorder were changed from "at least twice weekly for 6 months" to "at least once weekly over the last 3 months".
- The criteria for anorexia nervosa were changed; there is no longer a requirement of amenorrhea.
- "Feeding disorder of infancy or early childhood", a rarely used diagnosis in DSM-IV, was renamed to avoidant/restrictive food intake disorder, and criteria were expanded.

==== Elimination disorders ====
- No significant changes.
- Disorders in this chapter were previously classified under disorders usually first diagnosed in infancy, childhood, or adolescence in DSM-IV. Now it is an independent classification in DSM 5.

==== Sleep–wake disorders ====
- "Sleep disorders related to another mental disorder, and sleep disorders related to a general medical condition" were deleted.
- Primary insomnia became insomnia disorder, and narcolepsy is separate from other hypersomnolence.
- There are now three breathing-related sleep disorders: obstructive sleep apnea hypopnea, central sleep apnea, and sleep-related hypoventilation.
- Circadian rhythm sleep–wake disorders were expanded to include advanced sleep phase syndrome, irregular sleep–wake type, and non-24-hour sleep–wake type. Jet lag was removed.
- Rapid eye movement sleep behavior disorder and restless legs syndrome are each a disorder, instead of both being listed under "dyssomnia not otherwise specified" in DSM-IV.

==== Sexual dysfunctions ====
- DSM-5 has sex-specific sexual dysfunctions.
- For females, sexual desire and arousal disorders are combined into female sexual interest/arousal disorder.
- Sexual dysfunctions (except substance-/medication-induced sexual dysfunction) now require a duration of approximately 6 months and more exact severity criteria.
- A new diagnosis is genito-pelvic pain/penetration disorder which combines vaginismus and dyspareunia from DSM-IV.
- Sexual aversion disorder was deleted.
- Subtypes for all disorders include only "lifelong versus acquired" and "generalized versus situational" (one subtype was deleted from DSM-IV).
- Two subtypes were deleted: "sexual dysfunction due to a general medical condition" and "due to psychological versus combined factors".

==== Gender dysphoria ====
- DSM-IV's gender identity disorder is similar to, but not the same as, gender dysphoria in DSM-5. Separate criteria for children, adolescents and adults that are appropriate for varying developmental states are added.
- Subtypes of gender identity disorder based on sexual orientation were deleted.
- Among other wording changes, criterion A and criterion B (cross-gender identification, and aversion toward one's gender) were combined. Along with these changes comes the creation of a separate gender dysphoria in children as well as one for adults and adolescents. The grouping has been moved out of the sexual disorders category and into its own. The name change was made in part due to stigmatization of the term "disorder" and the relatively common use of "gender dysphoria" in the GID literature and among specialists in the area. The creation of a specific diagnosis for children reflects the lesser ability of children to have insight into what they are experiencing and ability to express it in the event that they have insight.

==== Disruptive, impulse-control, and conduct disorders ====
Some of these disorders were formerly part of the chapter on early diagnosis, oppositional defiant disorder; conduct disorder; and disruptive behavior disorder not otherwise specified became other specified and unspecified disruptive disorder, impulse-control disorder, and conduct disorders. Intermittent explosive disorder, pyromania, and kleptomania moved to this chapter from the DSM-IV chapter "Impulse-Control Disorders Not Otherwise Specified".

- Antisocial personality disorder is listed here and in the chapter on personality disorders (but ADHD is listed under neurodevelopmental disorders).
- Symptoms for oppositional defiant disorder are of three types: angry/irritable mood, argumentative/defiant behavior, and vindictiveness. The conduct disorder exclusion is deleted. The criteria were also changed with a note on frequency requirements and a measure of severity.
- Criteria for conduct disorder are unchanged for the most part from DSM-IV. A specifier was added for people with limited "prosocial emotion", showing callous and unemotional traits.
- People over the disorder's minimum age of 6 may be diagnosed with intermittent explosive disorder without outbursts of physical aggression. Criteria were added for frequency and to specify "impulsive and/or anger based in nature, and must cause marked distress, cause impairment in occupational or interpersonal functioning, or be associated with negative financial or legal consequences".

==== Substance-related and addictive disorders ====
- Gambling disorder and tobacco use disorder are new.
- Substance abuse and substance dependence from DSM-IV-TR have been combined into single substance use disorders specific to each substance of abuse within a new "addictions and related disorders" category. "Recurrent legal problems" was deleted and "craving or a strong desire or urge to use a substance" was added to the criteria. The threshold of the number of criteria that must be met was changed and severity from mild to severe is based on the number of criteria endorsed. Criteria for cannabis and caffeine withdrawal were added. New specifiers were added for early and sustained remission along with new specifiers for "in a controlled environment" and "on maintenance therapy".

There are no more polysubstance diagnoses in DSM-5; the substance(s) must be specified.

==== Neurocognitive disorders ====
- Dementia and amnestic disorder became major or mild neurocognitive disorder (major NCD, or mild NCD). DSM-5 has a new list of neurocognitive domains. "New separate criteria are now presented" for major or mild NCD due to various conditions. Substance/medication-induced NCD and unspecified NCD are new diagnoses.

==== Personality disorders ====
- Personality disorder (PD) previously belonged to a different axis than almost all other disorders, but is now in one axis with all mental and other medical diagnoses. However, the same ten types of personality disorder are retained.
- There is a call for the DSM-5 to provide relevant clinical information that is empirically based to conceptualize personality as well as psychopathology in personalities. The issue(s) of heterogeneity of a PD is problematic as well. For example, when determining the criteria for a PD it is possible for two individuals with the same diagnosis to have completely different symptoms that would not necessarily overlap. There is also concern as to which model is better for the DSM - the diagnostic model favored by psychiatrists or the dimensional model that is favored by psychologists. The diagnostic approach/model is one that follows the diagnostic approach of traditional medicine, is more convenient to use in clinical settings, however, it does not capture the intricacies of normal or abnormal personality. The dimensional approach/model is better at showing varied degrees of personality; it places emphasis on the continuum between normal and abnormal, and abnormal as something beyond a threshold whether in unipolar or bipolar cases.

==== Paraphilic disorders ====
- New specifiers "in a controlled environment" and "in remission" were added to criteria for all paraphilic disorders.
- A distinction is made between paraphilic behaviors, or paraphilias, and paraphilic disorders. All criteria sets were changed to add the word disorder to all of the paraphilias, for example, pedophilic disorder is listed instead of pedophilia. There is no change in the basic diagnostic structure since DSM-III-R; however, people now must meet both qualitative (criterion A) and negative consequences (criterion B) criteria to be diagnosed with a paraphilic disorder. Otherwise they have a paraphilia (and no diagnosis).

== Development ==
In 1999, a DSM-5 Research Planning Conference, sponsored jointly by APA and the National Institute of Mental Health (NIMH), was held to set the research priorities. Research Planning Work Groups produced "white papers" on the research needed to inform and shape the DSM-5 and the resulting work and recommendations were reported in an APA monograph and peer-reviewed literature. There were six workgroups, each focusing on a broad topic: Nomenclature, Neuroscience and Genetics, Developmental Issues and Diagnosis, Personality and Relational Disorders, Mental Disorders and Disability, and Cross-Cultural Issues. Three additional white papers were also due by 2004 concerning gender issues, diagnostic issues in the geriatric population, and mental disorders in infants and young children. The white papers have been followed by a series of conferences to produce recommendations relating to specific disorders and issues, with attendance limited to 25 invited researchers.

On July 23, 2007, the APA announced the task force that would oversee the development of DSM-5. The DSM-5 Task Force consisted of 27 members, including a chair and vice chair, who collectively represent research scientists from psychiatry and other disciplines, clinical care providers, and consumer and family advocates. Scientists working on the revision of the DSM had a broad range of experience and interests. The APA Board of Trustees required that all task force nominees disclose any competing interests or potentially conflicting relationships with entities that have an interest in psychiatric diagnoses and treatments as a precondition to appointment to the task force. The APA made all task force members' disclosures available during the announcement of the task force. Several individuals were ruled ineligible for task force appointments due to their competing interests.

The DSM-5 field trials included test-retest reliability which involved different clinicians doing independent evaluations of the same patient—a common approach to the study of diagnostic reliability.

About 68% of DSM-5 task-force members and 56% of panel members reported having ties to the pharmaceutical industry, such as holding stock in pharmaceutical companies, serving as consultants to industry, or serving on company boards.

== Revisions and updates ==
Beginning with the fifth edition, it is intended that diagnostic guideline revisions will be added incrementally. The DSM-5 is identified with Arabic rather than Roman numerals, marking a change in how future updates will be created. Incremental updates will be identified with decimals (DSM-5.1, DSM-5.2, etc.), until a new edition is written. The change reflects the intent of the APA to respond more quickly when a preponderance of research supports a specific change in the manual. The research base of mental disorders is evolving at different rates for different disorders.

=== DSM-5-TR ===
Diagnostic and Statistical Manual of Mental Disorders, Fifth Edition, Text Revision
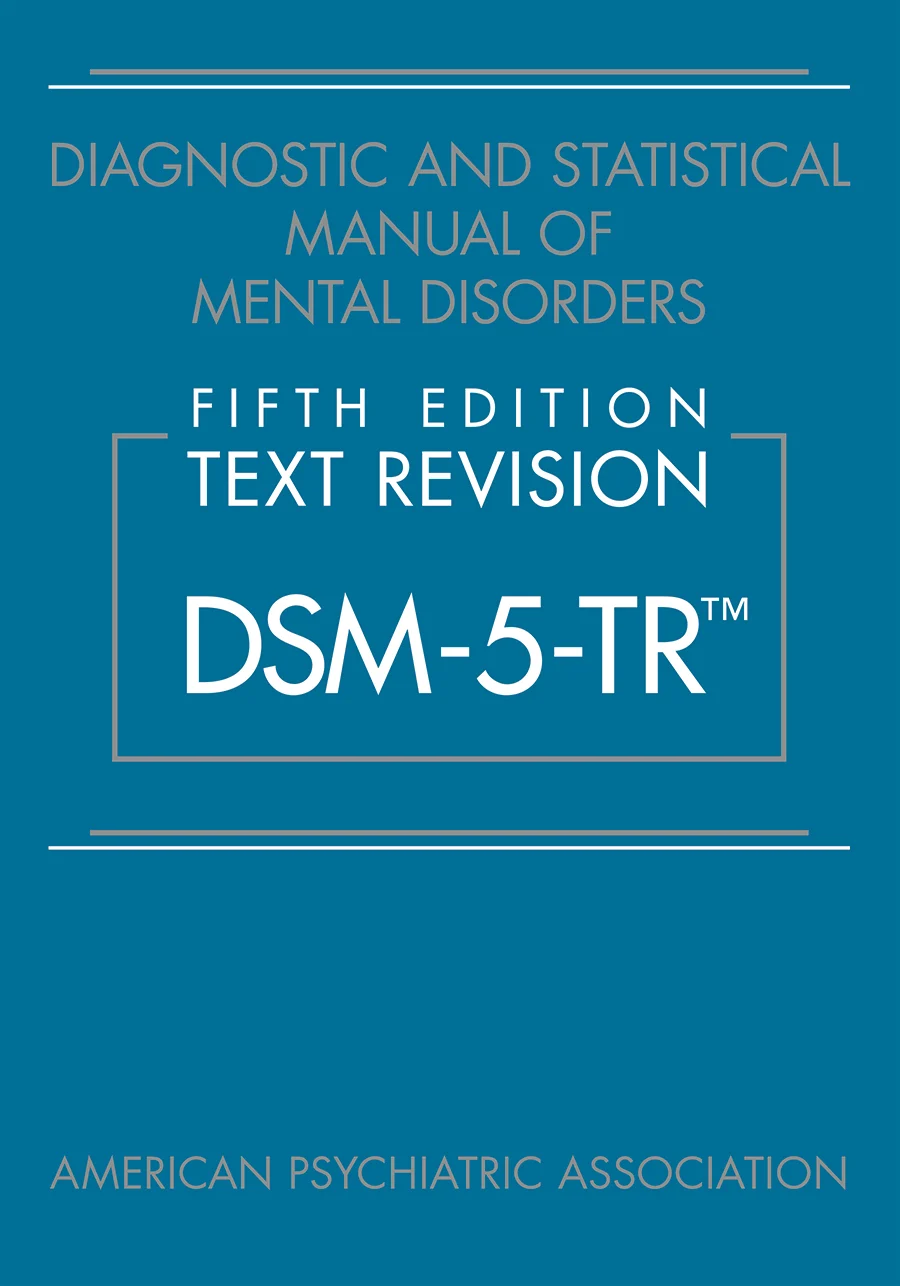
- Author: American Psychiatric Association
- Language: English
- Series: Diagnostic and Statistical Manual of Mental Disorders
- Subject: Classification and diagnosis of mental disorders
- Publication date: March 18, 2022
- Publication place: United States
- Media type: Print (hardcover, softcover); eBook
- Pages: 1120
- ISBN: 978-0-89042-576-3
- Preceded by: DSM-5
- Text: Diagnostic and Statistical Manual of Mental Disorders, Fifth Edition, Text Revision at Internet Archive
- Website: DSM-5-TR at APA website

A revision of DSM-5, titled DSM-5-TR, was published in March 2022, updating diagnostic criteria and ICD-10-CM codes. The diagnostic criteria for avoidant/restrictive food intake disorder were changed, along with adding entries for prolonged grief disorder, unspecified mood disorder, and stimulant-induced mild neurocognitive disorder. Prolonged grief disorder, which had been present in the ICD-11, had criteria agreed upon by consensus in a one day in-person workshop sponsored by the APA.

Three review groups for sex and gender, culture and suicide, along with an "ethnoracial equity and inclusion work group" were involved in the creation of the DSM-5-TR which led to additional sections for each mental disorder discussing sex and gender, racial and cultural variations, and adding diagnostic codes for specifying levels of suicidality and nonsuicidal self-injury for mental disorders.

Other changed disorders included:

- Autism spectrum disorder
- Bipolar I disorder, Bipolar II disorder, and related bipolar disorders
- Obsessive–compulsive personality disorder in the alternative DSM-5 model for personality disorders
- Depressive episodes with short-duration hypomania
- Intellectual developmental disorder
- Delusional disorder
- Disruptive mood dysregulation disorder
- Brief psychotic disorder

== Usage ==
The National Board of Medical Examiners (NBME) which is responsible for creating and publishing board exams for medical students around the United States conforms to the use of DSM-5 criteria.

== Criticism ==
=== General ===
Robert Spitzer, the head of the DSM-III task force, publicly criticized the APA for mandating that DSM-5 task force members sign a nondisclosure agreement, effectively conducting the whole process in secret: "When I first heard about this agreement, I just went bonkers. Transparency is necessary if the document is to have credibility, and, in time, you're going to have people complaining all over the place that they didn't have the opportunity to challenge anything." Allen Frances, chair of the DSM-IV task force, expressed a similar concern.

David Kupfer, chair of the DSM-5 task force, and Darrel A. Regier, MD, MPH, vice chair of the task force, whose industry ties are disclosed with those of the task force, countered that "collaborative relationships among government, academia, and industry are vital to the current and future development of pharmacological treatments for mental disorders". They asserted that the development of DSM-5 is the "most inclusive and transparent developmental process in the 60-year history of DSM". The developments to this new version can be viewed on the APA website. During periods of public comment, members of the public could sign up at the DSM-5 website and provide feedback on the various proposed changes.

In June 2009, Allen Frances issued strongly worded criticisms of the processes leading to DSM-5 and the risk of "serious, subtle, [...] ubiquitous" and "dangerous" unintended consequences such as new "false 'epidemics'". He writes that "the work on DSM-V has displayed the most unhappy combination of soaring ambition and weak methodology" and is concerned about the task force's "inexplicably closed and secretive process". His and Spitzer's concerns about the contract that the APA drew up for consultants to sign, agreeing not to discuss drafts of the fifth edition beyond the task force and committees, have also been aired and debated.

In 2011, psychologist Brent Robbins co-authored a national letter for the Society for Humanistic Psychology that brought thousands into the public debate about the DSM. Approximately 13,000 individuals and mental health professionals signed a petition in support of the letter. Thirteen other American Psychological Association divisions endorsed the petition. In a November 2011 article about the debate in the San Francisco Chronicle, Robbins notes that under the new guidelines, certain responses to grief could be labeled as pathological disorders, instead of being recognized as being normal human experiences. In 2012, a footnote was added to the draft text which explains the distinction between grief and depression.

The DSM-5 has been criticized for purportedly saying nothing about the biological underpinnings of mental disorders. A book-long appraisal of the DSM-5, with contributions from philosophers, historians and anthropologists, was published in 2015.

A 2015 essay from an Australian university criticized the DSM-5 for having poor cultural diversity, stating that recent work done in cognitive sciences and cognitive anthropology is still only accepting western psychology as the norm.

DSM-5 includes a section on how to conduct a "cultural formulation interview", which gives information about how a person's cultural identity may be affecting expression of signs and symptoms. The goal is to make more reliable and valid diagnoses for disorders subject to significant cultural variation.

=== Gender and Sexual Identity Disorders work group ===
The appointment, in May 2008, of two of the taskforce members, Kenneth Zucker and Ray Blanchard, led to an internet petition to remove them. According to MSNBC, "The petition accuses Zucker of having engaged in 'junk science' and promoting 'hurtful theories' during his career, especially advocating the idea that children who are unambiguously male or female anatomically, but seem confused about their gender identity, can be treated by encouraging gender expression in line with their anatomy." According to The Gay City News:

Dr. Ray Blanchard, a psychiatry professor at the University of Toronto, is deemed offensive for his theories that some types of transsexuality are paraphilias, or sexual urges. In this model, transsexuality is not an essential aspect of the individual, but a misdirected sexual impulse.

The National LGBTQ Task Force issued a statement questioning the APA's decision to appoint Kenneth Zucker and Ray Blanchard to the working group for Gender and Sexual Identity Disorders, stating that, "Kenneth Zucker and Ray Blanchard are clearly out of step with the occurring shift in how doctors and other health professionals think about transgender people and gender variance."

Blanchard responded, "Naturally, it's very disappointing to me there seems to be so much misinformation about me on the Internet. [They didn't distort] my views, they completely reversed my views." Zucker "rejects the junk-science charge, saying there 'has to be an empirical basis to modify anything' in the DSM. As for hurting people, 'in my own career, my primary motivation in working with children, adolescents and families is to help them with the distress and suffering they are experiencing, whatever the reasons they are having these struggles. I want to help people feel better about themselves, not hurt them.'"

=== Financial conflicts of interest and perverse dependencies ===
The financial association of DSM-5 panel members with industry continues to be a concern for financial conflict of interest. Of the DSM-5 task force members, 69% report having ties to the pharmaceutical industry, an increase from the 57% of DSM-IV task force members. A study of the DSM-5-TR found that 60% of the American physicians contributing to the revised edition received payments from industry.

Although the APA has since instituted a disclosure policy for DSM-5 task force members, many still believe the association has not gone far enough in its efforts to be transparent and to protect against industry influence. In a 2009 Point/Counterpoint article, Lisa Cosgrove, PhD and Harold J. Bursztajn, MD noted that "the fact that 70% of the task force members have reported direct industry ties—an increase of almost 14% over the percentage of DSM-IV task force members who had industry ties—shows that disclosure policies alone, especially those that rely on an honor system, are not enough and that more specific safeguards are needed".

The role of the DSM-5 in protecting the interests of wealthy and politically powerful owners of the means of production in the United States has been criticized as well. Placing the blame for predictable and common psychological distress caused by the deleterious effects of economic inequality in the United States on individuals by attributing it to mental pathology has been criticized as hindering change of the root causes of the distress. The DSM-5's expansive criteria that attribute mental pathology to people with distress or impairment from a wide-ranging constellation of experiences has been criticized for pathologizing an unhelpful number of people that a psychiatric diagnosis is not beneficial for.

=== Borderline personality disorder controversy ===
In 2003, the Treatment and Research Advancements National Association for Personality Disorders (TARA-APD) campaigned to change the name and designation of borderline personality disorder in DSM-5. The paper How Advocacy is Bringing BPD into the Light reported that "the name BPD is confusing, imparts no relevant or descriptive information, and reinforces existing stigma." Instead, it proposed the name "emotional regulation disorder" or "emotional dysregulation disorder." There was also discussion about changing borderline personality disorder, an Axis II diagnosis (personality disorders and intellectual disability), to an Axis I diagnosis (clinical disorders).

The TARA-APD recommendations do not appear to have affected the American Psychiatric Association, the publisher of the DSM. As noted above, the DSM-5 does not employ a multi-axial diagnostic scheme, therefore the distinction between Axis I and II disorders no longer exists in the DSM nosology. The name, the diagnostic criteria for, and description of, borderline personality disorder remain largely unchanged from DSM-IV-TR.

=== British Psychological Society response ===
The British Psychological Society stated in its June 2011 response to DSM-5 draft versions, that it had "more concerns than plaudits." It criticized proposed diagnoses as "clearly based largely on social norms, with 'symptoms' that all rely on subjective judgements... not value-free, but rather reflect[ing] current normative social expectations," noting doubts over the reliability, validity, and value of existing criteria, that personality disorders were not normed on the general population, and that "not otherwise specified" categories covered a "huge" 30% of all personality disorders.

It also expressed a major concern that "clients and the general public are negatively affected by the continued and continuous medicalisation of their natural and normal responses to their experiences... which demand helping responses, but which do not reflect illnesses so much as normal individual variation."

The Society suggested as its primary specific recommendation, a change from using "diagnostic frameworks" to a description based on an individual's specific experienced problems, and that mental disorders are better explored as part of a spectrum shared with normality:

[We recommend] a revision of the way mental distress is thought about, starting with recognition of the overwhelming evidence that it is on a spectrum with 'normal' experience, and that psychosocial factors such as poverty, unemployment and trauma are the most strongly-evidenced causal factors. Rather than applying preordained diagnostic categories to clinical populations, we believe that any classification system should begin from the bottom up – starting with specific experiences, problems or 'symptoms' or 'complaints'... We would like to see the base unit of measurement as specific problems (e.g. hearing voices, feelings of anxiety etc.)? These would be more helpful too in terms of epidemiology.

While some people find a name or a diagnostic label helpful, our contention is that this helpfulness results from a knowledge that their problems are recognised (in both senses of the word) understood, validated, explained (and explicable) and have some relief. Clients often, unfortunately, find that diagnosis offers only a spurious promise of such benefits. Since – for example – two people with a diagnosis of 'schizophrenia' or 'personality disorder' may possess no two symptoms in common, it is difficult to see what communicative benefit is served by using these diagnoses. We believe that a description of a person's real problems would suffice. Moncrieff and others have shown that diagnostic labels are less useful than a description of a person's problems for predicting treatment response, so again diagnoses seem positively unhelpful compared to the alternatives.

— British Psychological Society, June 2011 response

Many of the same criticisms also led to the development of the Hierarchical Taxonomy of Psychopathology, an alternative, dimensional framework for classifying mental disorders.

=== National Institute of Mental Health ===
National Institute of Mental Health director Thomas R. Insel, MD, wrote in an April 29, 2013 blog post about the DSM-5:

The goal of this new manual, as with all previous editions, is to provide a common language for describing psychopathology. While DSM has been described as a "Bible" for the field, it is, at best, a dictionary, creating a set of labels and defining each. The strength of each of the editions of DSM has been "reliability" – each edition has ensured that clinicians use the same terms in the same ways. The weakness is its lack of validity ... Patients with mental disorders deserve better.

Insel also discussed an NIMH effort to develop a new classification system, Research Domain Criteria (RDoC), currently for research purposes only. Insel's post sparked a flurry of reaction, some of which might be termed sensationalistic, with headlines such as "Goodbye to the DSM-V", "Federal institute for mental health abandons controversial 'bible' of psychiatry", "National Institute of Mental Health abandoning the DSM", and "Psychiatry divided as mental health 'bible' denounced". Other responses provided a more nuanced analysis of the NIMH Director's post.

In May 2013, Insel, on behalf of NIMH, issued a joint statement with Jeffrey A. Lieberman, MD, president of the American Psychiatric Association, that emphasized that DSM-5 "... represents the best information currently available for clinical diagnosis of mental disorders. Patients, families, and insurers can be confident that effective treatments are available and that the DSM is the key resource for delivering the best available care. The National Institute of Mental Health (NIMH) has not changed its position on DSM-5." Insel and Lieberman say that DSM-5 and RDoC "represent complementary, not competing, frameworks" for characterizing diseases and disorders. However, epistemologists of psychiatry tend to see the RDoC project as a putative revolutionary system that in the long run will try to replace the DSM, its expected early effect being a liberalization of the research criteria, with an increasing number of research centers adopting the RDoC definitions.
