= Circle of Friends (disabled care) =

Social inclusion method in disability care

The Circle of Friends approach is a method designed to increase the socialization and inclusion of a disabled person with their peers. A Circle of Friends consists of a "focus" child, for whom the group was established, six to eight classroom peers, and an adult facilitator who meet once weekly to socialize and work on specific goals. Most available resources about the Circle of Friends approach are geared toward its use with school-aged children with various difficulties.

== Background ==
Circle of Friends was originally developed in North America to promote the inclusion of people with disabilities and other difficulties in their local communities and in mainstream educational settings. In the past, it was more common for adults with disabilities to be confined to institutions, and for students with special educational needs to be educated in separate schools. The Circle of Friends approach coincides with a shift in societal attitudes toward inclusion of people with disabilities in mainstream settings. It is intended to promote healthy friendships and to create and reinforce positive social experiences.

Although it was developed in North America, Circle of Friends has been implemented and researched extensively in the United Kingdom in a variety of settings, and with children of varying ages and difficulties. The approach is often used for children with autism spectrum disorders because they have trouble developing social and communication skills. In general, children with emotional, behavioral, and social problems may benefit from the approach because they are often isolated and lack of peer groups. In the UK the approach was promoted as a means of avoiding exclusions as well a practical form of inclusive education by Colin Newton and Derek Wilson of Inclusive Solutions. Their training in the approach was nationally recognised. It was well received in numerous Eastern European countries that valued an approach to inclusion not relied on high-cost resources but on mobilizing the ever-present peer group."

== Structure ==
In the educational setting, general guidelines exist for establishing a Circle of Friends.

- Establishment of prerequisites: Before starting a Circle of Friends, it is necessary to ensure the cooperation and collaboration of school personnel (e.g. principals, teachers) and obtain consent from the focused child's parents or caregivers.
- Class discussion to set up the Circle of Friends: The next step is to meet with the focused child's class. The focused child consents to this meeting but does not attend, so that class members feel comfortable sharing information. The class discussion is meant to introduce the idea of a Circle of Friends. Students are encouraged to think about the benefits of friendship and consider the barriers to friendship the focused child encounters, and also empathize and share their own experiences with friendship. The focused child's strengths and difficulties are discussed, and links between the focused child's behavior and problems with peer relationships are made. Making these links is an important first step in problem-solving solutions. At the end of the meeting, six to eight volunteers are sought to take part in the Circle of Friends.
- Initial meeting of the Circle of Friends: At the initial Circle of Friends meeting, details of the class discussion are summarized for the focus child. Ground rules for the group are then set (i.e. confidentiality, listening, seeking adult help when needed), as well as a schedule for meetings.
- Weekly meetings of the Circle of Friends: At weekly meetings, classmates play an important role in helping the focused child set and reach goals. Some research suggests that all children involved in the Circle of Friends benefit from the experience not just the focused child.

Adapted versions of Circle of Friends exist. One version differs from the original approach in that the focus child is not absent for the initial class meeting. Others have described Circle of Friends meetings taking place on a daily basis.

== See also ==
- Person-centred planning, a set of approaches designed to assist an individual to plan their life and supports
- Circles of Support and Accountability, a similar model used in criminal rehabilitation
