= Developmental language disorder =

Disorder characterized by impaired language development

- Specialty: Neurology

Developmental language disorder (DLD), formerly known as dysphasia, is identified when a child has problems with language development that continue into school age and beyond. The language problems have a significant impact on everyday social interactions or educational progress, and occur in the absence of autism spectrum disorder, intellectual disability, or a known biomedical condition. The most obvious problems are difficulties in using words and sentences to express meanings, but for many children, understanding of language (receptive language) is also a challenge. This may not be evident unless the child is given a formal assessment.

Recent work has moved toward standardising terms for children's language difficulties. In 2017, the CATALISE consortium recommended adopting "developmental language disorder" (DLD) for a subset of language disorder within the broader category of speech, language, and communication needs, with the aim of clearer communication, greater public awareness, and improved access to services. Earlier labels such as "developmental dysphasia" and "developmental aphasia" were discouraged because they suggest parallels with adult, brain-injury related conditions. The North American term "specific language impairment" (SLI) was also judged too narrow, as it focused on language in isolation and did not account for other difficulties that may co-occur.

== Classification ==
=== Terminology ===
The term developmental language disorder (DLD) was endorsed in a consensus study involving a panel of experts (CATALISE Consortium) in 2017. The study was conducted in response to concerns that a wide range of terminology was used in this area, with the consequence that there was poor communication, lack of public recognition, and in some cases children were denied access to services. Developmental language disorder is a subset of language disorder, which is itself a subset of the broader category of speech, language and communication needs.

The terminology for children's language disorders has been extremely wide-ranging and confusing, with many labels that have overlapping but not necessarily identical meanings. In part this confusion reflected uncertainty about the boundaries of DLD, and the existence of different subtypes. Historically, the terms "developmental dysphasia" or "developmental aphasia" were used to describe children with the clinical picture of DLD. These terms have, however, largely been abandoned, as they suggest parallels with adult-acquired aphasia. This is misleading, as DLD is not caused by brain damage.

Although the term DLD has been used for many years, it has been less common than the term specific language impairment (SLI), which has been widely adopted, especially in North America. The definition of SLI overlaps with DLD, but was rejected by the CATALISE panel because it was seen as overly restrictive in implying that the child had relatively pure problems with language in the absence of any other impairments. Children with such selective problems are relatively rare, and there is no evidence that they respond differently to intervention, or have different causal factors, from other children with language problems.

In the UK education system, the term "speech, language and communication needs" is widely used, but this is far broader than DLD, and includes children with speech, language and social communication difficulties arising from a wide range of causes.

The question of whether to refer to children's language problems as a 'disorder' was a topic of debate among the CATALISE consortium, but the conclusion was that 'disorder' conveyed the serious nature and potential consequences of persistent language deficits. It is also parallel with other neurodevelopmental conditions and consistent with diagnostic frameworks such as the DSM-5 and ICD-11. Where there are milder or more transient difficulties, 'language difficulties' may be a more appropriate term.

=== Areas of language difficulty ===
DLD can affect a range of areas of language and the degree of impairment in different areas of language can vary from child to child. However, although there have been attempts to define different subtypes, these have not generally resulted in robust categories. The recommendation of the CATALISE panel was that the specific areas of impairment should be assessed and documented for individual children, while recognizing that different children might have different combinations of problems. The areas which can be affected are:

- Grammar – This involves the ability to combine words into grammatically correct sentences (syntax) and to combine parts of words together (morphology) such as adding grammatical endings to verbs like -ing or -ed or to add prefixes and suffixes like dis- or -ation. These different aspect of grammar are processed in the ventral stream in the same hemisphere (left), but in different parts of the brain: morphology is processed in the left anterior middle temporal gyrus and left anterior inferior temporal sulcus, and syntax is processed right below. This demonstrates the complexities of grammatical structure processing in the brain. A child with DLD might make certain grammar mistakes. For instance, a child may say 'me jump here', instead of 'I jumped here'. Comprehension of sentences can also be affected. For instance, there may be difficulty understanding meaning expressed by word order, and so confusion about what is blue in a sentence like 'the pencil on the shoe is blue', and a tendency to use general knowledge rather than linguistic cues to meaning, or problems in interpreting grammatical markers of number or tense.
- Semantics – This refers to children's ability to understand the meaning of words and how meanings are expressed by combining words together. Semantic processing mainly happens in the left inferior frontal gyrus. Children with DLD often have limited vocabulary and may make heavy use of a small set of words with rather general meanings. Children with developmental language disorder (DLD) often struggle with lexical ambiguity—polysemous words such as "cold", which can denote low temperature, illness, or social distance. In autism spectrum disorder (ASD), research reports difficulties with possessive pronouns and with plural morphology. Some learners avoid plural inflection and instead use a singular noun with a numeral or plural quantifier.
- Word finding – Children with word finding difficulties may know a word, but have difficulty accessing it for production – similar to the tip of the tongue phenomenon. It reflects the inability to access specific lexical items for production, despite awareness of their existence within the mental lexicon. It is a common feature in developmental language disorders (DLD), in which children have trouble retrieving words during conversation and other expressive tasks. These problems can affect expressive vocabulary, disrupt narrative coherence, and impair social communication, and they vary across individuals—from occasional lapses to persistent retrieval deficits.
- Pragmatics – Pragmatics refers to the ability to select the appropriate message, or interpret what others say, in relation to context. It is affected by right hemisphere brain damage. Pragmatic difficulties can give an impression of oddity, with the content of language not fitting the environmental or social context; comprehension may be over-literal; the child may chatter incessantly, be poor at turn-taking in conversation and maintaining a topic.
- Discourse – Discourse refers to a level of organization of language beyond the sentence. A child with limitations in this domain may have limited ability to tell a story or describe a set of events in a logical sequence.
- Verbal memory and learning – Problems with remembering words or sentences can affect both the learning of new vocabulary, and the understanding of long or complex sentences. Young children with DLD may say their first words later than other children. It may also take children with DLD longer to learn and remember novel words. This is due to the effect of DLD on declarative memory.
- Phonology – Phonology is the branch of linguistics concerned with the way sounds are combined in words. Phonological information is stored in the superior temporal sulcus. Children with difficulties with phonology may fail to distinguish between certain speech sounds, such as 't' and 'k', so that 'cake' is produced as 'tate'. Such difficulties are not unusual as part of typical development in toddlers, but they would usually resolve by the time children are 4–5 years old. Difficulties with producing some speech sounds accurately may reduce intelligibility of speech. In addition, more subtle difficulties in recognizing specific sounds in words (phonological awareness) can lead to literacy difficulties.

=== Relationship with speech disorders ===
Speech is the act of articulating sounds, and this can be impaired for all kinds of reasons – a structural problem such as cleft lip and cleft palate, a neurological problem affecting motor control of the speech apparatus dysarthria, or inability to perceive distinctions between sounds because of hearing loss. Some distortions of speech sounds, such as a lisp, are commonly seen in young children. These misarticulations should not be confused with language problems, which involve the ability to select and combine linguistic elements to express meanings, and the ability to comprehend meanings.

Although speech disorders can be distinguished from language disorders, they can also co-occur. When a child fails to produce distinctions between speech sounds for no obvious reason, this is typically regarded as a language problem affecting the learning of phonological contrasts. The classification of and terminology for disorders of speech sound production is a subject of considerable debate. In practice, even for those with specialist skills, it is not always easy to distinguish between phonological disorders and other types of speech production problem. Speech sound disorder is any problem with speech production arising from any cause.

Speech sound disorders of unknown cause that are not accompanied by other language problems are a relatively common reason for young children to be referred to speech-language therapy (speech-language pathology). These often resolve by around 4–5 years of age with specialist intervention, and so would not meet criteria for DLD. Where such problems continue beyond five years of age, they are usually accompanied by problems in broader language domains and have a poorer prognosis, so a diagnosis of DLD with speech sound disorder is then appropriate.

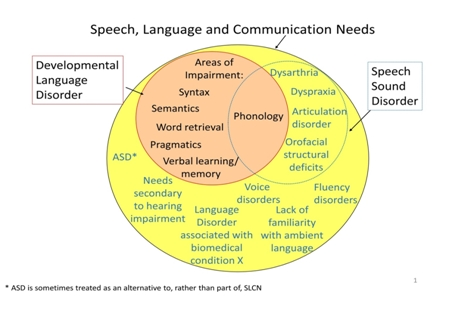
Developmental language disorder impairment compared to other common language related disorders

=== Relationship with other neurodevelopmental disorders ===
DLD often co-occurs with other neurodevelopmental disorders of unknown origin, such as attention-deficit hyperactivity disorder, developmental dyslexia or developmental coordination disorder. These do not preclude a diagnosis of DLD, but should be noted as co-occurring conditions.

== Risk factors ==
It is generally accepted that DLD is strongly influenced by genetic factors. The best evidence comes from the twin study method. Two twins growing up together are exposed to the same home environment, yet may differ radically in their language skills. Such different outcomes are, however, much more common in fraternal (non-identical) twins, who are genetically different. Identical twins share the same genes and tend to be much more similar in language ability. There can be some variation in the severity and persistence of DLD in identical twins, indicating that non-genetic factors affect the course of disorder, but it is unusual to find a child with DLD who has an identical twin with typical language.

There was considerable excitement when a large, multigenerational family with a high rate of DLD were found to have a mutation of the FOXP2 gene just in the affected family members. However, subsequent studies have found that, though DLD runs in families, it is not usually caused by a mutation in FOXP2 or another specific gene. Current evidence suggests that there are many different genes that can influence language learning, and DLD results when a child inherits a particularly detrimental combination of risk factors, each of which may have only a small effect. Nevertheless, study of the mode of action of the FOXP2 gene has helped identify other common genetic variants involved in the same neural pathways that may play a part in causing DLD.

Language disorders are associated with aspects of home environment, and it is often assumed that this is a causal link, with poor language stimulation leading to weak language skills. Twin studies, however, show that two children in the same home environment can have very different language outcomes, suggesting we should consider other explanations for the link. Children with DLD often grow up into adults who have relatively low educational attainments, and their children may share a genetic risk for language disorder.

One non-genetic factor that is known to have a specific impact on language development is being a younger sibling in a large family.

=== Associated factors ===
It has long been noted that males are more affected by DLD than females, with a sex ratio of affected males-to-females around 3 or 4:1. However, the sex difference is much less striking in epidemiological samples, suggesting that similar problems may exist in females but are less likely to be detected. The reason for the sex difference is not well understood.

Poor motor skills are commonly found in children with DLD. Standardized measures of motor ability confirm that children with DLD exhibit deficits in fine and gross motor skill, both simple and complex. These difficulties also extend to speech-motor ability, particularly with the control of their articulatory movements. Children with DLD have difficulty with motor sequence learning and may show deficits in other procedural motor processes as well.

Brain scans do not usually reveal any obvious abnormalities in children with DLD, although quantitative comparisons have found differences in brain size or relative proportions of white or grey matter in specific regions. In some cases, unusual brain gyri are found. To date, no consistent 'neural signature' for DLD has been found, although some studies have noted evidence for involvement of subcortical systems. Differences in the brains of children with DLD versus typically developing children are subtle and may overlap with atypical patterns seen in other neurodevelopmental disorders.

== Diagnosis ==
DLD is defined purely in behavioural terms: there is no biological test. There are three points that need to be met for a diagnosis of DLD:

1. The child has language difficulties that create obstacles to communication or learning in everyday life,
2. The child's language problems are unlikely to resolve by five years of age, and
3. The problems are not associated with a known biomedical condition such as brain injury, neurodegenerative conditions, genetic conditions or chromosome disorders such as Down syndrome, sensorineural hearing loss, autism spectrum disorder, or intellectual disability.

For research and epidemiological purposes, specific cutoffs on language assessments have been used to document the first criterion. Tomblin et al. proposed the EpiSLI criterion, based on five composite scores representing performance in three domains of language (vocabulary, grammar, and narration) and two modalities (comprehension and production). Children scoring in the lowest 10% on two or more composite scores are identified as having language disorder.

The second criterion, persistence of language problems, can be difficult to judge in a young child, but longitudinal studies have shown that difficulties are less likely to resolve for children who have poor language comprehension, rather than difficulties confined to expressive language. In addition, children with isolated difficulties in just one of the areas noted under 'subtypes' tend to make better progress than those whose language is impaired in several areas.

The third criterion specifies that DLD is used for children whose language disorder is not part of another biomedical condition, such as a genetic syndrome, a sensorineural hearing loss, neurological disease, autism spectrum disorder or intellectual disability – these were termed 'differentiating conditions' by the CATALISE panel. Language disorders occurring with these conditions need to be assessed and children offered appropriate intervention, but a terminological distinction is made so that these cases would be diagnosed as language disorder associated with the main diagnosis being specified: e.g. "language disorder associated with autism spectrum disorder." The reasoning behind these diagnostic distinctions is discussed further by Bishop (2017).

=== Benchmarks for children with developmental language disorder ===
Common signs at one year of age:

- No reaction to sound
- No babbling
- Difficulty feeding
- No imitation
- Limited use of gestures

At two years of age:

- Makes minimal attempts to communicate with gestures or words
- Has not spoken their first words
- Difficulty following simple directions
- Inconsistent response to "no"

At three years of age:

- Limited use of speech
- Incomprehensible speech
- Limited understanding of simple questions
- Difficulty naming objects
- Frustration related to communication

At four years of age:

- Uses only 3-word phrases
- Speech is not understandable to parents
- Takes a long time to understand others
- Difficulty asking questions and finding words to express thoughts

At five years of age:

- Speaks only in simple sentences
- Speech is not understandable to teachers
- Difficulty answering questions
- Difficulty with complex directions
- Difficulty telling stories
- Difficulty with peer interactions

=== Assessment ===
Assessment will usually include an interview with the child's caregiver, observation of the child in an unstructured setting, a hearing test, and standardized tests of language. There is a wide range of language assessments in English. Some are restricted for use by experts in speech-language pathology: speech and language therapists (SaLTs/SLTs) in the UK, speech-language pathologists (SLPs) in the US and Australia. A commonly used test battery for diagnosis of DLD is the Clinical Evaluation of Language Fundamentals (CELF). Assessments that can be completed by a parent or teacher can be useful to identify children who may require more in-depth evaluation. The Children's Communication Checklist (CCC–2) is a parent questionnaire suitable for assessing everyday use of language in children aged four years and above who can speak in sentences. Informal assessments, such as language samples, are often used by speech-language therapists/pathologists to complement formal testing and give an indication of the child's language in a more naturalistic context. A language sample may be of a conversation or narrative retell. In a narrative language sample, an adult may tell the child a story using a wordless picture book (e.g. Frog Where Are You?, Mayer, 1969), then ask the child to use the pictures and tell the story back. Language samples can be transcribed using computer software such as the Systematic Analysis of Language Software, and then analyzed for a range of features: e.g., the grammatical complexity of the child's utterances, whether the child introduces characters to their story or jumps right in, whether the events follow a logical order, and whether the narrative includes a main idea or theme and supporting details.

There is, however, a large gap in assessment of developmental language disorder, specifically in bilingual and multilingual children. For a multilingual child to be diagnosed with DLD, they must be assessed in every language that they speak and show signs of DLD in each one. Current assessment practices for diagnosing DLD in multilingual children is inadequate. "Lack of knowledge about bilingual children and their needs is largely responsible for current referral and assessment practices." SLPs do not speak every language and are unable to properly assess many children for language disorders as a result. The best practices for assessing multilingual children involves a combination of approaches including but not limited to questionnaires, parent/guardian interviews, and direct assessment.

=== Autism Spectrum Disorder and Selective Mutism in Children with Speech and Language Delays ===
Identifying autism spectrum disorder can be broadened into three categories: sociability and empathy, imaginative play, and use of language. Sociability and Empathy: Search for limitations in the child's capacity to participate in social interactions, comprehend others' emotions, and deduce their viewpoints. Communicative Use of Language: Evaluate for challenges in utilizing language proficiently for communication. Imaginative Play: Assess the child's capability to participate in inventive and imaginative play. Sensory Responses: Observe any uncommon or modified reactions to sensory stimuli.

Children with Speech-Language Impairment (SLI) have a higher likelihood of ASD compared to the general population. It is essential to conduct a detailed developmental history and a specific evaluation for autism characteristics. Use screening tools to help detect ASD. Verbal Children with Autism can be classified as follows: Impaired: They experience significant challenges with using language. Borderline: They have language abilities but with some impairments. Normal: Their language use falls within typical ranges, considering the context of autism.

Selective mutism is an anxiety disorder where individuals are unable to speak in certain social situations despite being capable of speaking in other environments. This disorder is strongly linked to social anxiety. Children who have selective mutism do not speak in certain social situations, such as at school or with peers, but can speak normally in other contexts, like at home with their family. These children generally have good comprehension of language and can understand conversations and instructions, but they struggle to communicate verbally in specific scenarios. Research demonstrates that these children are capable of speaking normally or nearly normally in some settings, which emphasizes that their challenge lies not in their ability to speak, but in the anxiety related to speaking in particular situations. Compared to those with social phobia alone, children with selective mutism exhibit higher levels of social anxiety and internalizing symptoms. Some children with selective mutism may also have minor difficulties with speech and language, which may not be as obvious in kids with social phobia who mainly show social anxiety without significant language problems. Kids with selective mutism can improve with specific interventions that focus on both their anxiety and any speech and language challenges they may have. It is crucial to refer these children to the right services early on to ensure they receive effective treatment and support.

== Treatment ==
Treatment is usually carried out by speech and language therapists/pathologists, who use a wide range of techniques to stimulate language learning. In the past, there was a vogue for drilling children in grammatical exercises, using imitation and elicitation, but such methods fell into disuse when it became apparent that there was little generalization to everyday situations. Contemporary approaches to enhancing development of language structure, for younger children at least, are more likely to adopt 'milieu' methods, in which the intervention is interwoven into natural episodes of communication, and the therapist builds on the child's utterances, rather than dictating what will be talked about. Interventions for older children, may be more explicit, telling the children what areas are being targeted and giving explanations regarding the rules and structures they are learning, often with visual supports.

In addition, there has been a move away from a focus solely on grammar and phonology toward interventions that develop children's social use of language, often working in small groups that may include typically developing as well as language-impaired peers.

Another way in contemporary remediation differ from the past is that parents are more likely to be directly involved, but this approach is largely used with preschool children, rather than those whose problems persist into school age.

For school-aged children, teachers are increasingly involved in intervention, either in collaboration with speech and language therapists/pathologists, or as the main agents of delivery of the intervention. Evidence for the benefits of a collaborative approach is emerging, but the benefits of asking education staff to be the main deliverers of SLT intervention (the "consultative" approach) are unclear.

In this field, randomized controlled trial methodology has not been widely used, and this makes it difficult to assess clinical efficacy with confidence. Children's language will tend to improve over time, and without controlled studies, it can be hard to know how much of observed change is down to a specific treatment. There is, however, increasing evidence that direct 1:1 intervention with an SLT/P can be effective for improving vocabulary and expressive language. There have been few studies of interventions that target receptive language, though some positive outcomes have been reported. One method that has proven effective to enhance inferential comprehension in children (5-6 years) with developmental language disorder is Oral inferential comprehension intervention.

=== How to help a child with developmental language disorder ===
- Talk to the child often to help them learn new words
- Read to them every day. Point out words you see
- Point to signs in the grocery store, at school, and outside
- Speak to the child in the language you know best
- Listen and answer when the child talks
- Get the child to ask you questions
- Give the child time to answer questions
- Keep them in school: children who are school-refusers have poorer language skills overall, and a higher incidence of language impairments

== Outcome ==
Longitudinal studies indicate that problems are largely resolved by five years of age in around 40% of four-year-olds with early language delays who have no other presenting risk factors. However, for children who still have significant language difficulties at school entry, reading problems are common, even for children who receive specialist help, and educational attainments are typically poor. Poor outcomes are most common in cases where comprehension as well as expressive language is affected. There is also evidence that scores on tests of nonverbal ability of children with DLD decrease over the course of development.

DLD is associated with an elevated risk of social, emotional and mental health concerns. For instance, in a UK survey, 64% of a sample of 11-year-olds with DLD scored above a clinical threshold on a questionnaire for psychiatric difficulties, and 36% were regularly bullied, compared with 12% of comparison children. In the longer-term, studies of adult outcomes of children with DLD have found elevated rates of unemployment, social isolation and psychiatric disorder among those with early comprehension difficulties. However, better outcomes are found for children who have milder difficulties and do not require special educational provision.

== Prevalence ==
Epidemiological studies of children in the US and the UK converge in estimating the prevalence of DLD in five-year-olds at around 7%. Recently, an Australian population-based study demonstrated comparable prevalence of DLD amongst 10 year-old children. Therefore, the prevalence is about one in every 15 children. By these statistics, in a classroom of 30 students, 2 would have DLD. In research by Tomblin et al., prevalence of DLD in racial/ethnic groups was highest in Native Americans, with African Americans being the next highest, followed by Hispanic people, and then White people. No students of Asian descent presented with DLD; however, other research does indicate that DLD is present in children of Asian descent.

== Research ==
Much research has focused on trying to identify what makes language learning difficult for some children. A major divide is between theories that attribute the difficulties to a low-level problem with auditory temporal processing, and those that propose there is a deficit in a specialised language-learning system. Other accounts emphasise deficits in specific aspects of learning and memory. It can be difficult to choose between theories because they do not always make distinctive predictions, and there is considerable heterogeneity among children with DLD. It has also been suggested that DLD may only arise when more than one underlying deficit is present.

Research has also suggested that peer nominations reveal differences in social understanding between children with DLD and their typically developing peers, as evidenced by the unequal distribution of peer acknowledgments. Research on peer and friendship acknowledgments offers insight into the relationship between language development and peer interactions. Children with DLD experience lower levels of acceptance, particularly during the early school years, as indicated by peer nominations. Improvement in peer acknowledgments may not be solely attributed to language and communication interventions, suggesting that other factors influence friendships. Findings from social cognition tasks, the tendency for children with DLD to receive more positive peer nominations, and the discrepancies in their friendship acknowledgments collectively suggest that the ability to comprehend others and identify peers as friends may significantly impact social connections. Swedish qualitative study of school children with DLD and other school stakeholders support the notion that DLD can create challenges in both learning and social relationships, while appropriate individual support may reduce some of these difficulties.

=== Developmental language disorder in adults ===
Relatively little research has been conducted to test the outcomes of DLD in adults. In a study comparing 17 men with DLD to siblings without DLD, researchers found that the DLD men had normal intelligence with higher performance IQ than verbal IQ. The participants still exhibited a severe and persisting language disorder, severe literacy impairments, and significant deficits in theory of mind and phonological processing. Within the DLD cohort, higher childhood intelligence and language were associated with superior cognitive and language ability at final adult outcome. In their mid-thirties, the DLD cohort had significantly worse social adaptation (with prolonged unemployment and a paucity of close friendships and love relationships) compared with both their siblings and National Child Development Study control cohorts, matched on childhood IQ and social class. Self-reports showed a higher rate of schizotypal features but not schizoaffective disorder. Four DLD adults had serious mental health problems (two had developed schizophrenia).

== See also ==
- Auditory processing disorder
- Dyslexia
- Language processing
- Linguistics
- Origin of speech
- Pragmatic language impairment
