= Least dangerous assumption =

Educational philosophy

The least dangerous assumption is an inclusive approach to educational policy and pedagogy. It holds that, "in the absence of conclusive data, educational decisions should be based on assumptions which, if incorrect, will have the least dangerous effect on the student". This concept was coined in 1984 by Anne Donnellan, a researcher in special education. The principle is most closely associated with the areas of intellectual disability and communication disorder, although it can be applied more generally in the domain of learning and teaching, and beyond. In most contexts in which it is used, the principle holds that one should, in the absence of evidence to the contrary, presume competence, rather than non-competence, in others.

The "presumption of competence" can be regarded as the "least dangerous" assumption to make about a person because, the principle holds, it is less damaging to presume competence in another, and to be wrong, than it is to presume non-competence (incompetence) in another, and to be wrong. Take the example of a teacher who is uncertain about the extent to which a given student with a severe communication impairment understands what is said to them. The principle holds that it is less dangerous to assume that the student understands everything that is said, and to be wrong about that, than to assume that the student understands nothing that is said, and to be wrong in that direction. Under the latter assumption, the risk is that the teacher speaks too little to the student (or, in an extreme form of the argument, the teacher may not speak to the student at all). This is potentially 'dangerous' because it deprives the child of the known benefits of a language-rich environment. Under the former assumption the risk is that the teacher will speak too much to the student, which, advocates of this approach maintain, is less dangerous.

Debates about presumed competence often focus on what counts as "conclusive data," particularly when making complex educational decisions about people with disabilities.

== Criticism ==
Some professionals believe the term and concept to be problematic for several reasons, namely the American Speech–Language–Hearing Association , advocating against making any assumptions, be it towards competence or incompetence citing the philosophy's connection to facilitated communication (a discredited technique in which a facilitator supports or guides the hand or arm of a nonverbal individual to help them type or point to letters, purportedly to communicate).

== See also ==
- Dignity of risk
- Social inclusion
