= Inclusion (education) =

Where disabled students spend most of their time with non-disabled students

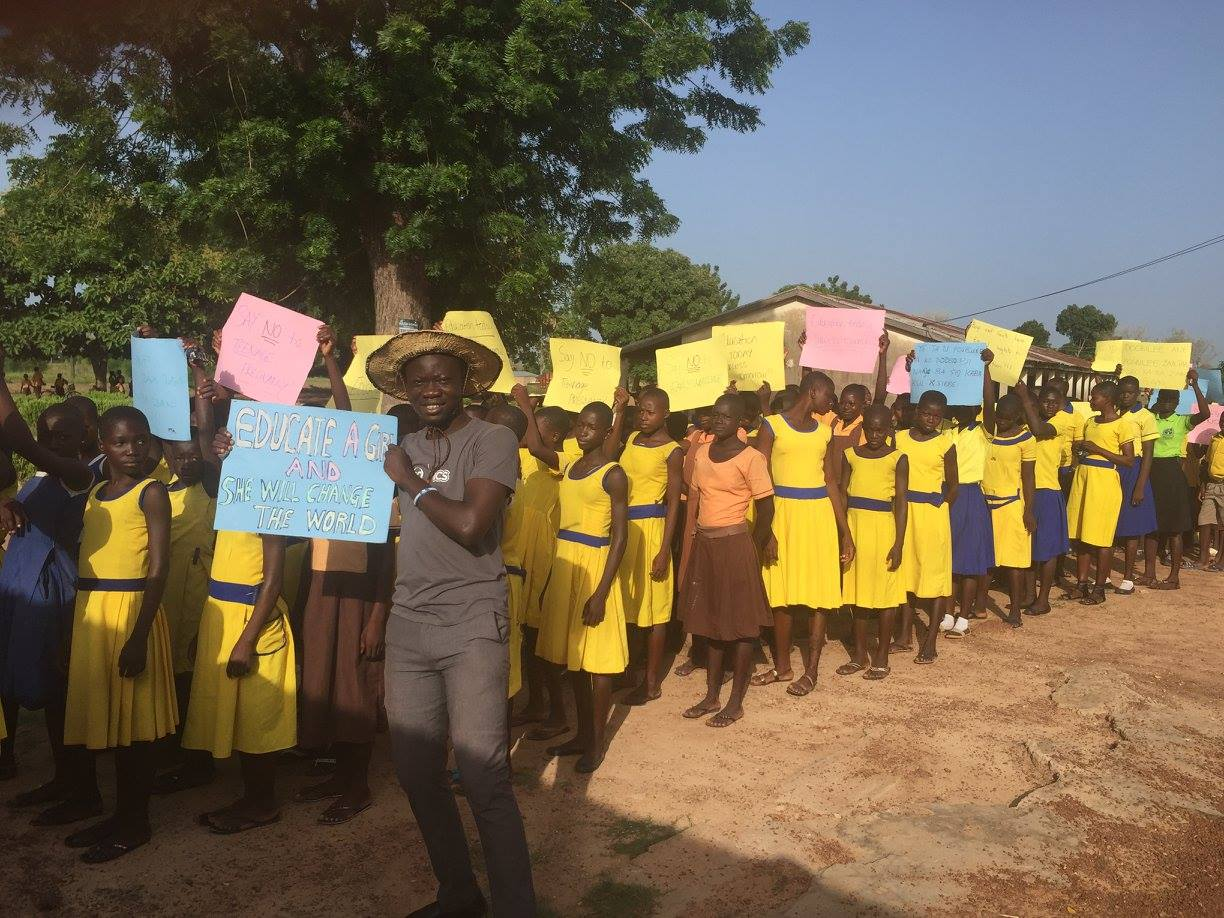
Students in Ghana in a parade for including girls and women in education

Inclusion in education refers to including all students to equal access to equal opportunities of education and learning, and is distinct from educational equality or educational equity. It arose in the context of special education with an individualized education program or 504 plan, and is built on the notion that it is more effective for students with special needs to have the said mixed experience for them to be more successful in social interactions leading to further success in life. The philosophy behind the implementation of the inclusion model does not prioritize, but still provides for the utilization of special classrooms and special schools for the education of students with disabilities. Inclusive education models are brought into force by educational administrators with the intention of moving away from seclusion models of special education to the fullest extent practical, the idea being that it is to the social benefit of general education students and special education students alike, with the more able students serving as peer models and those less able serving as motivation for general education students to learn empathy.

Implementation of these practices varies. Schools most frequently use the inclusion model for select students with mild to moderate special needs. Fully inclusive schools, which are rare, do not separate "general education" and "special education" programs; instead, the school is restructured so that all students learn together.

Inclusive education differs from the 'integration' or 'mainstreaming' model of education, which tended to be a concern. A premium is placed upon full participation by students with disabilities and upon respect for their social, civil, and educational rights. Feeling included is not limited to physical and cognitive disabilities, but also includes the full range of human diversity with respect to ability, language, culture, gender, age and of other forms of human differences. Richard Wilkinson and Kate Pickett wrote, "student performance and behaviour in educational tasks can be profoundly affected by the way we feel, we are seen and judged by others. When we expect to be viewed as inferior, our abilities seem to diminish". This is why the United Nations Sustainable Development Goal 4 recognizes the need for adequate physical infrastructures and the need for safe, inclusive learning environments.

== Integration and mainstreaming ==
Inclusion has different historical roots/background which may be integration of students with severe disabilities in the US (who may previously been excluded from schools or even lived in institutions) or an inclusion model from Canada and the US (e.g., Syracuse University, New York) which is very popular with inclusion teachers who believe in participatory learning, cooperative learning, and inclusive classrooms.

Inclusive education differs from the early university professor's work (e.g., 1970s, Education Professor Carol Berrigan of Syracuse University, 1985; Douglas Biklen, Dean of School of Education through 2011) in integration and mainstreaming which were taught throughout the world including in international seminars in Italy. Mainstreaming (e.g., the Human Policy Press poster; If you thought the wheel was a good idea, you'll like the ramp) tended to be concerned about "readiness" of all parties for the new coming together of students with significant needs. Thus, integration and mainstreaming principally was concerned about disability and 'special educational needs' (since the children were not in the regular schools) and involved teachers, students, principals, administrators, School Boards, and parents changing and becoming 'ready for' students who needed accommodation or new methods of curriculum and instruction (e.g., required federal IEPs – individualized education program) by the mainstream.

By contrast, inclusion is about the child's right to participate and the school's duty to accept the child returning to the US Supreme Court's Brown vs. the Board of Education decision and the new Individuals with Disabilities Education (Improvement) Act (IDEIA). Inclusion rejects the use of special schools or classrooms, which remain popular among large multi-service providers, to separate students with disabilities from students without disabilities. A premium is placed upon full participation by students with disabilities, in contrast to earlier concept of partial participation in the mainstream, and upon respect for their social, civil, and educational rights. Inclusion gives students with disabilities skills they can use in and out of the classroom.

== Principles and necessary resources ==
Although once hailed as a way to increase achievement while decreasing costs, full inclusion does not save money. It is not designed to reduce students' needs, and its first priority may not even be to improve academic outcomes; in most cases, it merely moves the special education professionals (now dual certified for all students in some states) out of "their own special education" classrooms and into a corner of the general classroom or as otherwise designed by the "teacher-in-charge" and "administrator-in-charge". To avoid harm to the academic education of students with disabilities, a full panoply of services and resources is required (of education for itself), including:

- Adequate supports and services for the student
- Well-designed individualized education programs
- Professional development for all teachers involved, general and special educators alike
- Time for teachers to plan, meet, create, and evaluate the students together
- Reduced class size based on the severity of the student needs
- Professional skill development in the areas of cooperative learning, peer tutoring, adaptive curriculum
- Collaboration between parents or guardians, teachers or para educators, specialists, administration, and outside agencies.
- Sufficient funding so that schools will be able to develop programs for students based on student need instead of the availability of funding.

Indeed, the students with special needs do receive funds from the federal government, by law originally the Educational for All Handicapped Children Act of 1974 to the present day, Individuals with Disabilities Education Improvement Act, which requires its use in the most integrated setting.

=== Common practices in inclusive classrooms ===
Students in an inclusive classroom are generally placed with their chronological age-mates, regardless of whether the students are working above or below the typical academic level for their age. Also, to encourage a sense of belonging, emphasis is placed on the value of friendships. Teachers often nurture a relationship between a student with special needs and a same-age student without a special educational need. Another common practice is the assignment of a buddy to accompany a student with special needs at all times (for example in the cafeteria, on the playground, on the bus and so on). This is used to show students that a diverse group of people make up a community, that no one type of student is better than another, and to remove any barriers to a friendship that may occur if a student is viewed as "helpless." Such practices reduce the chance for elitism among students in later grades and encourage cooperation among groups.

Teachers use a number of techniques to help build classroom communities:

- Using games designed to build community
- Involving students in solving problems
- Sharing songs and books that teach community
- Openly dealing with individual differences by discussion
- Assigning classroom jobs that build community
- Teaching students to look for ways to help each other
- Utilizing physical therapy equipment such as standing frames, so students who typically use wheelchairs can stand when the other students are standing and more actively participate in activities
- Encouraging students to take the role of teacher and deliver instruction (e.g. read a portion of a book to a student with severe disabilities)
- Focusing on the strength of a student with special needs
- Create classroom checklists
- Take breaks when necessary
- Create an area for children to calm down
- Organize student desk in groups
- Create a self and welcoming environment
- Set ground rules and stick with them
- Help establish short-term goals
- Design a multi-faceted curriculum
- Communicate regularly with parents and/or caregivers
- Seek support from other special education teachers

Inclusionary practices are commonly utilized by using the following team-teaching models:

- One teach, one support:

In this model, the content teacher will deliver the lesson and the special education teacher will assist student's individual needs and enforce classroom management as needed.

- One teach, one observe:

In this model, the teacher with the most experience in the content will deliver the lesson and the other teacher will float or observe. This model is commonly used for data retrieval during IEP observations or Functional Behavior Analysis.

- Station teaching (rotational teaching):

In this model, the room is divided into stations in which the students will visit with their small groups. Generally, the content teacher will deliver the lesson in his/her group, and the special education teacher will complete a review or an adapted version of the lesson with the students.

- Parallel teaching:

In this model, one half of the class is taught by the content teacher and one half is taught by the special education teacher. Both groups are being taught the same lesson, just in a smaller group.

- Alternative teaching:

In this method, the content teacher will teach the lesson to the class, while the special education teacher will teach a small group of students an alternative lesson.

- Team teaching (content/support shared 50/50):

Both teachers share the planning, teaching, and supporting equally. This is the traditional method, and often the most successful co-teaching model.

Some recent research suggests inclusion can be successful if certain things are done to help teachers become more educated on how to implement inclusion. Len Barton is a professor of Inclusive Education at the Institute of Education at the University of London and gave a lecture on how inclusion can be beneficial if certain criteria are followed. In a lecture he gave, he himself states that inclusion is not the one and only answer to helping education but it is a stepping stone. The conclusion of his studies states many criteria teachers need in order to make inclusion work. The first criterion is making the topic of inclusion the main part of educational programs for teachers in order to emphasize the importance of inclusion in boosting all students learning and participation. Barton says another factor is including disability and equality awareness training to teachers and staff done by trained professionals in order to increase teachers understanding behind inclusion.

=== Children with extensive support needs ===
For children with significant or severe disabilities, the programs may require what are termed health supports (e.g., positioning and lifting; visit to the nurse clinic), direct one-to-one aide in the classroom, assistive technology, and an individualized program which may involve the student "partially" (e.g., videos and cards for "visual stimulation"; listening to responses)in the full lesson plan for the "general education student". It may also require the introduction of teaching techniques commonly used (e.g., introductions and interest in science) that teachers may not use within a common core class.

Another way to think of health supports are as a range of services that may be needed from specialists, or sometimes generalists, ranging from speech and language, to visual and hearing (sensory impairments), behavioral, learning, orthopedics, autism, deaf-blindness, and traumatic brain injury, according to Virginia Commonwealth University's Dr. Paul Wehman. As Dr. Wehman has indicated, expectations can include post secondary education, supported employment in competitive sites, and living with family or other residential places in the community.

In 2005, comprehensive health supports were described in National Goals for Intellectual and Developmental Disabilities as universally available, affordable and promoting inclusion, as supporting well-informed, freely chosen health care decisions, culturally competent, promoting health promotion, and insuring well trained and respectful health care providers. In addition, mental health, behavioral, communication and crisis needs may need to be planned for and addressed.

"Full inclusion" – the idea that all children, including those with severe disabilities, can and should learn in a regular classroom has also taken root in many school systems, and most notably in the province of New Brunswick.

=== Fully inclusive schools and general or special education policies ===
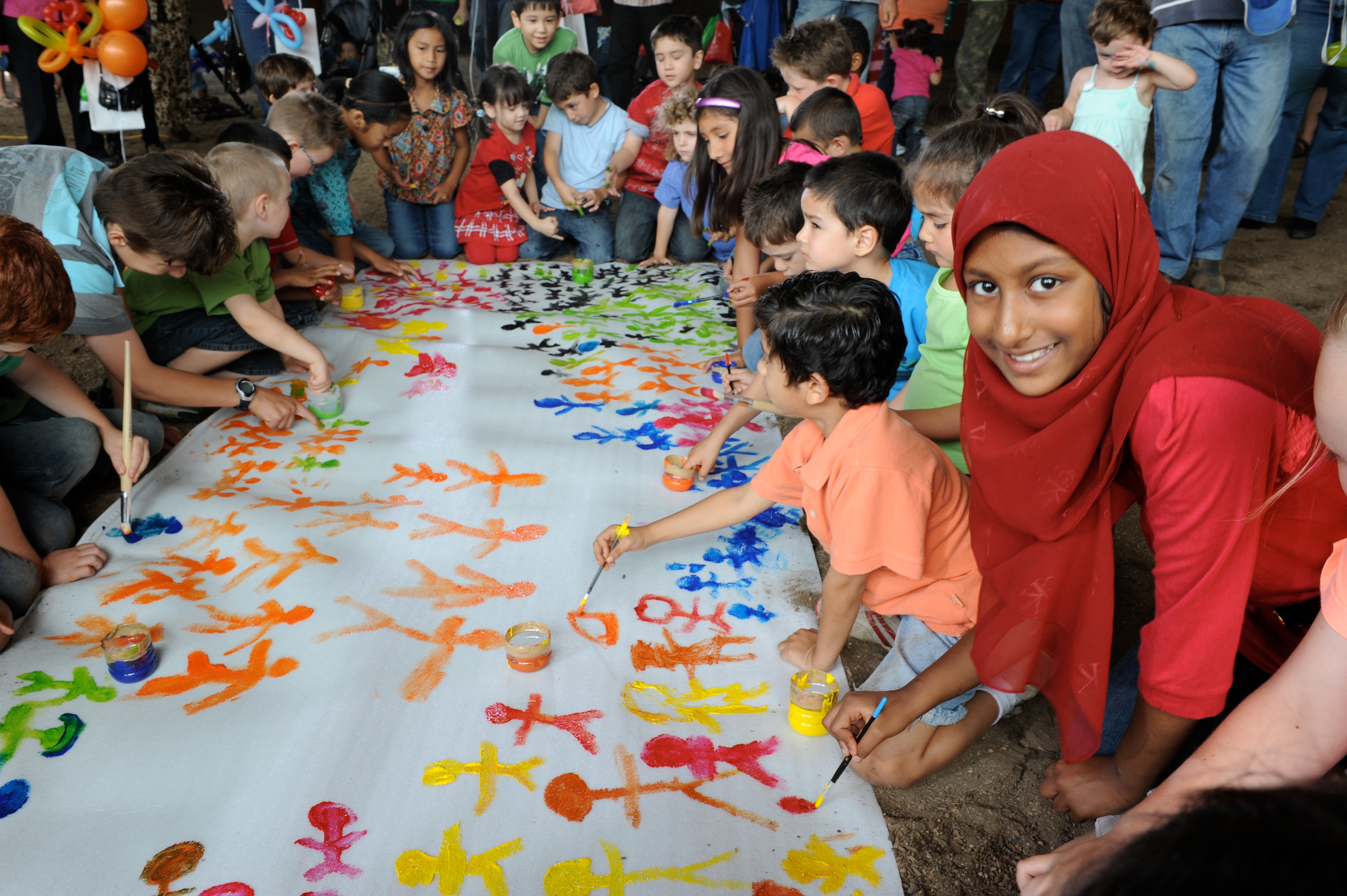
Harmony Day (5475651018)

Fully inclusive schools, which are rare, no longer distinguish between "general education" and "special education" programs which refers to the debates and federal initiatives of the 1980s, such as the Community Integration Project and the debates on home schools and special education-regular education classrooms; instead, the school is restructured so that all students learn together. All approaches to inclusive schooling require administrative and managerial changes to move from the traditional approaches to elementary and high school education.

Inclusion remains in 2015 as part of school (e.g., Powell & Lyle, 1997, now to the most integrated setting from LRE) and educational reform initiatives in the US and other parts of the world. Inclusion is an effort to improve quality in education in the fields of disability, is a common theme in educational reform for decades, and is supported by the UN Convention on the Rights of Persons with Disabilities (UN, 2006). Inclusion has been researched and studied for decades, though reported lightly in the public with early studies on heterogeneous and homogeneous ability groupings (Stainback & Stainback, 1989), studies of critical friends and inclusion facilitators (e.g., Jorgensen & Tashie, 2000), self-contained to general education reversal of 90% (Fried & Jorgensen, 1998), among many others obtaining doctoral degrees throughout the US.

== Classification of students and educational practices ==
Classification of students by disability is standard in educational systems which use diagnostic, educational and psychological testing, among others. However, inclusion has been associated with its own planning, including MAPS which Jack Pearpoint leads with still leads in 2015 and person-centred planning with John O'Brien and Connie Lyle O'Brien who view inclusion as a force for school renewal.

Inclusion has two sub-types: the first is sometimes called regular inclusion or partial inclusion, and the other is full inclusion.

Inclusive practice is not always inclusive but is a form of integration. For example, students with special needs are educated in regular classes for nearly all of the day, or at least for more than half of the day. Whenever possible, the students receive any additional help or special instruction in the general classroom, and the student is treated like a full member of the class. However, most specialized services are provided outside a regular classroom, particularly if these services require special equipment or might be disruptive to the rest of the class (such as speech therapy), and students are pulled out of the regular classroom for these services. In this case, the student occasionally leaves the regular classroom to attend smaller, more intensive instructional sessions in a separate classrooms, or to receive other related services, such as speech and language therapy, occupational and/or physical therapy, psychological services, and social work. This approach can be very similar to many mainstreaming practices, and may differ in little more than the educational ideals behind it.

In the "full inclusion" setting, the students with special needs are always educated alongside students without special needs, as the first and desired option while maintaining appropriate supports and services. Some educators say this might be more effective for the students with special needs. At the extreme, full inclusion is the integration of all students, even those that require the most substantial educational and behavioral supports and services to be successful in regular classes and the elimination of special, segregated special education classes. Special education is considered a service, not a place and those services are integrated into the daily routines (See, ecological inventories) and classroom structure, environment, curriculum and strategies and brought to the student, instead of removing the student to meet his or her individual needs. However, this approach to full inclusion is somewhat controversial, and it is not widely understood or applied to date.

Much more commonly, local educational agencies have the responsibility to organize services for children with disabilities. They may provide a variety of settings, from special classrooms to mainstreaming to inclusion, and assign, as teachers and administrators often do, students to the system that seems most likely to help the student achieve his or her individual educational goals. Students with mild or moderate disabilities, as well as disabilities that do not affect academic achievement, such as using power wheelchair, scooter or other mobility device, are most likely to be fully included; indeed, children with polio or with leg injuries have grown to be leaders and teachers in government and universities; self advocates travel across the country and to different parts of the world. However, students with all types of disabilities from all the different disability categories (See, also 2012 book by Michael Wehmeyer from the University of Kansas) have been successfully included in general education classes, working and achieving their individual educational goals in regular school environments and activities.

=== Alternatives to inclusion programs: school procedures and community development ===
Students with disabilities who are not included are typically either mainstreamed or segregated.

A mainstreamed student attends some general education classes, typically for less than half the day, and often for less academically rigorous or career-oriented classes. For example, a young student with significant intellectual disabilities might be mainstreamed for physical education classes, art classes and storybook time, but spend reading and mathematics classes with other students that have similar disabilities ("needs for the same level of academic instruction"). They may have access to a resource room for remediation or enhancement of course content, or for a variety of group and individual meetings and consultations.

A segregated student attends no classes with non-disabled students with disability a tested category determined before or at school entrance. He or she might attend a special school termed residential schools that only enrolls other students with disabilities, or might be placed in a dedicated, self-contained classroom in a school that also enrolls general education students. The latter model of integration, like the 1970s Jowonio School in Syracuse, is often highly valued when combined with teaching such as Montessori education techniques. Home schooling was also a popular alternative among highly educated parents with children with significant disabilities.

Residential schools have been criticized for decades, and the government has been asked repeatedly to keep funds and services in the local districts, including for family support services for parents who may be currently single and raising a child with significant challenges on their own. Children with special needs may already be involved with early childhood education which can have a family support component emphasizing the strengths of the child and family.

Some students may be confined to a hospital due to a medical condition (e.g., cancer treatments) and are thus eligible for tutoring services provided by a school district. Less common alternatives include homeschooling and, particularly in developing countries, exclusion from education.

=== Gender-sensitive curriculum ===
The notion of a gender-sensitive curriculum acknowledges the current reality of our bi-gender world and attempts to break down socialized learning outcomes that reinforce the notion that girls and boys are good at different things. Research has shown that while girls do struggle more in the areas of math and science and boys in the area of language arts, this is partly a socialization phenomenon. One key to creating a gender-friendly classroom is "differentiation" which essentially means when teachers plan and deliver their instruction with an awareness of gender and other student differences. Teachers can strategically group students for learning activities by a variety of characteristics so as to maximize individual strengths and contributions. Research has also shown that teachers differ in how they treat girls and boys in the classroom. Gender-sensitive practices necessitate equitable and appropriate attention to all learners. Teacher attention to content is also extremely important. For example, when trying to hold boys' attention teachers will often use examples that reference classically male roles, perpetuating a gender bias in content.

In addition to a curriculum that recognizes that gender impacts all students and their learning, other gender-sensitive curricula directly engages gender-diversity issues and topics. Some curricular approaches include integrating gender through story problems, writing prompts, readings, art assignments, research projects, and guest lectures that foster spaces for students to articulate their own understandings and beliefs about gender.

=== LGBTQ-inclusive curriculum ===
LGBTQ-inclusive curriculum is curriculum that includes positive representations of LGBTQ people, history, and events. LGBTQ curriculum also attempts to integrate these narratives without biasing the LGBTQ experience as a separate and fragmented from overarching social narratives and not as intersecting with ethnic, racial, and other forms of diversity that exist among LGBTQ individuals.

The purpose of an LGBTQ-inclusive curriculum is to ensure that LGBTQ students feel properly represented in curriculum narratives and therefore safer coming to school and more comfortable discussing LGBTQ-related topics. A study by GLSEN examined the impact of LGBTQ-inclusive practices on LGBTQ students' perceptions of safety. The study found that LGBT students in inclusive school settings were much less likely to feel unsafe because of their identities and more likely to perceive their peers as accepting and supportive.

Implementation of LGBTQ-inclusive curriculum involves both curriculum decisions and harnessing teachable moments in the classroom. One study by Snapp et al. showed that teachers often failed to intervene in LGBTQ-bullying.

Other research has suggested that education for healthcare professionals on how to better support LGBTQ patients has benefits for LGBTQ-healthcare service. Education in how to be empathic and conscientious of the needs of LGBTQ patients fits within the larger conversation about culturally-responsive healthcare.

=== Social and cultural inclusion ===
As used by UNESCO, inclusion refers to far more than students with special educational needs. It is centered on the inclusion of marginalized groups, such as religious, racial, ethnic, and linguistic minorities, immigrants, girls, the poor, students with disabilities, HIV/AIDS patients, remote populations, and more. In some places, these people are not actively included in education and learning processes. In the U.S. this broader definition is also known as "culturally responsive" education, which differs from the 1980s-1990s cultural diversity and cultural competency approaches, and is promoted among the ten equity assistance centers of the U.S. Department of Education, for example in Region IX (AZ, CA, NV), by the Equity Alliance at ASU. Gloria Ladson-Billings points out that teachers who are culturally responsive know how to base learning experiences on the cultural realities of the child (e.g. home life, community experiences, language background, belief systems). Proponents argue that culturally responsive pedagogy is good for all students because it builds a caring community where everyone's experiences and abilities are valued.

Proponents want to maximize the participation of all learners in the community schools of their choice and to rethink and restructure policies, curricula, cultures and practices in schools and learning environments so that diverse learning needs can be met, whatever the origin or nature of those needs. They say that all students can learn and benefit from education, and that schools should adapt to the physical, social, and cultural needs of students, rather than students adapting to the needs of the school. Proponents believe that individual differences between students are a source of richness and diversity, which should be supported through a wide and flexible range of responses. The challenge of rethinking and restructuring schools to become more culturally responsive calls for a complex systems view of the educational system (see Michael Patton), where one can extend the idea of strength through diversity to all participants in the educational system (e.g. parents, teachers, community members, staff).

Although inclusion is generally associated with elementary and secondary education, it is also applicable in postsecondary education. According to UNESCO, inclusion "is increasingly understood more broadly as a reform that supports and welcomes diversity amongst all learners."

== Education law and disability laws ==
The anti-discrimination laws providing the basis for changes in policy and statutes include:

- The UN Convention on the Rights of the Child (1989) which sets out children's rights in respect of freedom from discrimination and in respect of the representation of their wishes and views.
- The Convention against Discrimination in Education of UNESCO prohibits any discrimination, exclusion or segregation in education.
- The UNESCO Salamanca Statement (1994) which calls on all governments to give the highest priority to inclusive education.
- The UN Convention on the Rights of Persons with Disabilities (2006) which calls on all States Parties to ensure an inclusive education system at all levels.

=== From the least restrictive to the most integrated setting ===
For schools in the United States, the federal requirement that students be educated in the historic least restrictive environment that is a reasonable accommodation encourages the implementation of inclusion of students previously excluded by the school system. However, a critical critique of the LRE principle, commonly used to guide US schools, indicates that it often places restrictions and segregation on the individuals with the most severe disabilities. By the late 1980s, individuals with significant disabilities and their families and caregivers were already living quality lives in homes and local communities. The US Supreme Court has now ruled in the Olmstead Decision (1999) that the new principle is that of the "most integrated setting", as described by the national Consortium of Citizens with Disabilities, which should result in better achievement of national integration and inclusion goals in the 21st century.

== Inclusion rates in the world ==
The proportion of students with disabilities who are included varies by place and by type of disability, but it is relatively common for students with milder disabilities and less common with certain kinds of severe disabilities. In Denmark, 99% of students with learning disabilities like 'dyslexia' are placed in general education classrooms. In the United States, three out of five students with learning disabilities spend the majority of their time in the general education classroom.

Postsecondary statistics (after high school) are kept by universities and government on the success rates of students entering college, and most are eligible for either disability services (e.g., accommodations and aides) or programs on college campuses, such as supported education in psychiatric disabilities or College for Living. The former are fully integrated college degree programs with college and vocational rehabilitation services (e.g., payments for textbooks, readers or translators), and the latter courses developed similar to retirement institutes (e.g., banking for retirees).

== Collaboration ==
Inclusion settings allow children with and without disabilities to play and interact every day, even when they are receiving therapeutic services. When a child displays fine motor difficulty, his ability to fully participate in common classroom activities, such as cutting, coloring, and zipping a jacket may be hindered. While occupational therapists are often called to assess and implement strategies outside of school, it is frequently left up to classroom teachers to implement strategies in school. Collaborating with occupational therapists will help classroom teachers use intervention strategies and increase teachers' awareness about students' needs within school settings and enhance teachers' independence in implementation of occupational therapy strategies.

As a result of the 1997 re-authorization of the Individuals With Disabilities Education Act (IDEA), greater emphasis has been placed on delivery of related services within inclusive, general education environments. [Nolan, 2004] The importance of inclusive, integrated models of service delivery for children with disabilities has been widely researched indicating positive benefits. [Case-Smith& Holland, 2009] In traditional "pull out" service delivery models, children typically work in isolated settings one on one with a therapist, Case-Smith and Holland(2009) argue that children working on skills once or twice a week are "less likely to produce learning that leads to new behaviors and increased competence." [Case Smith &Holland, 2009, pg.419]. In recent years, occupational therapy has shifted from the conventional model of "pull out" therapy to an integrated model where the therapy takes place within a school or classroom.

Inclusion administrators have been requested to review their personnel to assure mental health personnel for children with mental health needs, vocational rehabilitation linkages for work placements, community linkages for special populations (e.g., "deaf-blind", "autism"), and collaboration among major community agencies for after school programs and transition to adulthood. Highly recommended are collaborations with parents, including parent-professional partnerships in areas of cultural and linguistic diversity (e.g., Syracuse University's special education Ph.D.'s Maya Kaylanpur and Beth Harry).

=== Relation to progressive education ===
Some advocates of inclusion promote the adoption of progressive education practices. In the progressive education or inclusive classroom, everyone is exposed to a "rich set of activities", and each student does what he or she can do, or what he or she wishes to do and learns whatever comes from that experience. Inclusive education practices frequently rely on active learning, authentic assessment practices, applied curriculum, multi-level instructional approaches, and increased attention to diverse student needs and individualization. Student inclusion often starts with motivation, in order to reach the goal of engagement while in the classroom.

=== Relation to Universal Design for Learning ===
A pedagogical practice that relates to both inclusive education and progressivist thinking is Universal Design for Learning (UDL). This method of teaching advocates for the removal of barriers in the physical and social environments that students of all abilities are within, as this is the main reason why students are unable to engage with the material presented in class. To implement UDL into a classroom, educators must understand not only the needs of their students, but also their abilities, interests, backgrounds, identities, prior knowledge, and their goals. By understanding their students, educators can then move on to using differentiated instruction to allow students to learn in a way that meets their needs; followed by accommodating and modifying programming to allow everyone to equitably and universally access curriculum. One study describes the applicability of UDL, by explaining that "the criteria for assessment of learning goals remain consistent. In effect, the learning endpoint goals stay the same, and it is the ways that student get to that endpoint of learning that is made more diverse. In this way, each student is challenged to learn to his or her own capacity, and is challenged through both multi-level authentic instruction and assessment".

Some classrooms or schools believe that being inclusive means that students with exceptionalities are in the room, without any attention paid to their need for support staff or modified curriculum expectations. Instead, inclusive education should be about teaching every single student and making the learning and teaching equitable, rather than equal. So, to implement UDL for the benefit of all students in the classroom, educators need to think about inclusivity relative to their students and their multifaceted identities – whether that is including materials written by authors of a particular race that happens to be prominent in their class, or creating more open spaces for a student in a wheel chair. Regardless of these changes, all students can benefit from them in one way or another.

=== Co-Design ===
One form of design that heavily involves the users in the process of designing is co-design. Collaboration with the people who have personal experience with the topic at hand or people who will be using the product design (in this case curriculum or methods for inclusive learning) will result in a more effective product for the users. While most students are capable of learning in current educational settings, implementing co-design can create a more effective learning setting for students. Using co-design has the possibility to create a more accommodating experience. Curriculum designers do not have enough relevant experience to design the best working curriculum and strategies that are implemented for learning along curriculums used in classrooms that do not work for every student. That is why co-designing with teachers and when possible, students can create a more inclusive experience when learning for students to benefit all students and not just students with disabilities or "special needs".

== Arguments for full inclusion in regular neighborhood schools ==
Advocates say that even partial non-inclusion is morally unacceptable. Proponents believe that non-inclusion reduces the disabled students' social importance and that maintaining their social visibility is more important than their academic achievement. Proponents say that society accords disabled people less human dignity when they are less visible in general education classrooms. Advocates say that even if typical students are harmed academically by the full inclusion of certain students with exceptionalities, that the non-inclusion of these students would still be morally unacceptable, as advocates believe that the harm to typical students' education is always less important than the social harm caused by making people with disabilities less visible in society.

A second key argument is that everybody benefits from inclusion. Advocates say that there are many children and young people who don't fit in (or feel as though they don't), and that a school that fully includes all disabled students feels welcoming to all. Moreover, at least one author has studied the impact a diversified student body has on the general education population and has concluded that students with 'mental retardation' [sic] who spend time among their peers show an increase in social skills and academic proficiency.

Advocates for inclusion say that the long-term effects of typical students who are included with disabled students at a very young age have a heightened sensitivity to the challenges that others face, increased empathy and compassion, and improved leadership skills, which benefits all of society.

A combination of inclusion and pull-out (partial inclusion) services has been shown to be beneficial to students with learning disabilities in the area of reading comprehension, and preferential for the special education teachers delivering the services.

Inclusive education can be beneficial to all students in a class, not just students with special needs. Some research show that inclusion helps students understand the importance of working together, and fosters a sense of tolerance and empathy among the student body.

"The inclusion of age-appropriate students in a general education classroom, alongside those with and without disability is beneficial to both parties involved. With inclusive education, all students are exposed to the same curriculum, they develop their own individual potential, and participate in the same activities at the same time. Therefore, there is a variety of ways in which learning takes place because students learn differently, at their own pace and by their own style. Effectively, inclusive education provides a nurturing venue where teaching and learning should occur despite pros and cons. It is evident that students with disabilities benefit more in an inclusive atmosphere because they can receive help from their peers with diverse abilities and they compete at the same level due to equal opportunities given." Research on the topic of inclusive education can contribute to the development of existing knowledge in several ways.

=== Positive effects in regular classrooms ===
There are many positive effects of inclusions where both the students with special needs along with the other students in the classroom both benefit. Research has shown positive effects for children with disabilities in areas such as reaching individualized education program (IEP) goal, improving communication and social skills, increasing positive peer interactions, many educational outcomes, and post school adjustments. Positive effects on children without disabilities include the development of positive attitudes and perceptions of persons with disabilities and the enhancement of social status with non-disabled peers. While becoming less discriminatory, children without disabilities that learn in inclusive classrooms also develop communication and leadership skills more rapidly.
Several studies have been done on the effects of inclusion of children with disabilities in general education classrooms. A study on inclusion compared integrated and segregated (special education only) preschool students. The study determined that children in the integrated sites progressed in social skills development while the segregated children actually regressed.
Another study shows the effect on inclusion in grades 2 to 5. The study determined that students with specific learning disabilities made some academic and affective gains at a pace comparable to that of normal achieving students. Specific learning disabilities students also showed an improvement in self-esteem and in some cases improved motivation.

A third study shows how the support of peers in an inclusive classroom can lead to positive effects for children with autism. The study observed typical inclusion classrooms, ages ranging from 7 years old to 11 years old. The peers were trained on an intervention technique to help their fellow autistic classmates stay on task and focused. The study showed that using peers to intervene instead of classroom teachers helped students with autism reduce off-task behaviors significantly. It also showed that the typical students accepted the student with autism both before and after the intervention techniques were introduced.

Intervening early within the life of a child with Autism Spectrum Disorder (ASD) can essentially change their long-term improvement and quality of life. The foundation of early integration lies in distinguishing and supporting each child's qualities, all whereas tending to their particular challenges.

== Criticism ==
Some see inclusion as harmful to students with special education needs as they may not receive as much attention and help that they need. Today, longitudinal studies follow the outcomes of students with disabilities in classrooms, which include college graduations and quality of life outcomes.

James M. Kauffman and Jeanmarie Badar wrote an article that "special education will one day be looked upon as having gone through a period of shameful neglect of students' needs". The authors argue that the general education classroom is not the appropriate place to give children with special needs an effective education. This claim is backed up by providing six mistaken assumptions that people believe and giving reasons why it will not work and providing alternative ideas. One mistaken assumption they give is that "All students, including those with disabilities, should be expected to meet high standards". To which the authors say each child has their own highest standard and that this outlook should be adapted to all children, no matter if they have a disability or not. They go on to say that special education programs that pull students with disabilities out into separate classrooms and provide them with more attention, more time, and sometimes different assignments are extremely beneficial. The differences in the way students learn are what should be embraced in order to allow them to learn to their highest ability, as their education and understanding of the curriculum are more important than being included in the general classroom at all times.

In 2020, Dr. Chelsea P. Tracy-Bronson of Stockton University did a study looking at what people at the district level are doing to help inclusion in special education run smoothly. The goal of this study was to show modern strategies that are being implemented and that are working in order to create an equitable and inclusive education for all students. The study was done using a qualitative research methodology that looked at the views and experiences of seven special education leaders that were implementing successful and equitable inclusion programs. The research proposes that inclusion in special education can be successful when the district-level leaders encourage inclusive strategies, challenge the long-standing nonexclusive model, and really cultivate an environment for teachers and students to grow and understand the inclusive model. Like Barton, this study shows that inclusion can be a great tool in creating an equitable and inclusive learning environment for students with special needs.

Garry Hornby combines the two opposing sides into one idea that may help everyone. After analyzing teachers' attitudes and procedures directed at making inclusion work, Hornby concluded that inclusion into the general classroom should depend on the needs of the individual child. The ideas he analyzed focused on including and teaching children with special needs all in the same ways, which was not working. These inclusion models not working, frustrated teachers and administrators, making them have negative attitudes towards inclusion. However, if individual situations were addressed and a plan was made for each child with special needs, inclusion models would be more effective as children with very high needs would not spend as much time in the general classroom. This would shift the attention from how to make inclusion work, to a focus on effective education and helping the students reach their personal goals.

Overall, experts in the field of education have done extensive research on the topic of inclusion in regards to special education and have found a lot of data supporting both sides of the debate. As seen, this debate on whether or not inclusion is the right model for special education has been long-lasting, and there is no telling if it will ever really be over.

Critics of full and partial inclusion include educators, administrators and parents. Full and partial inclusion approaches neglect to acknowledge the fact that most students with significant special needs require individualized instruction or highly controlled environments. Thus, general education classroom teachers often are teaching a curriculum while the special education teacher is remediating instruction at the same time. Similarly, a child with serious inattention problems may be unable to focus in a classroom that contains twenty or more active children. Although with the increase of incidence of disabilities in the student population, this is a circumstance all teachers must contend with, and is not a direct result of inclusion as a concept.

Full inclusion may be a way for schools to placate parents and the general public, using the word as a phrase to garner attention for what are in fact illusive efforts to educate students with special needs in the general education environment.

At least one study examined the lack of individualized services provided for students with IEPs when placed in an inclusive rather than mainstreamed environment.

Some researchers have maintained school districts neglect to prepare general education staff for students with special needs, thus preventing any achievement. Moreover, school districts often expound an inclusive philosophy for political reasons, and do away with any valuable pull-out services, all on behalf of the students who have no so say in the matter.

Inclusion is viewed by some as a practice philosophically attractive yet impractical. Studies have not corroborated the proposed advantages of full or partial inclusion. Moreover, "push in" servicing does not allow students with moderate to severe disabilities individualized instruction in a resource room, from which many show considerable benefit in both learning and emotional development.

Parents of disabled students may be cautious about placing their children in an inclusion program because of fears that the children will be ridiculed by other students, or be unable to develop regular life skills in an academic classroom.

Some argue that inclusive schools are not a cost-effective response when compared to cheaper or more effective interventions, such as special education. They argue that special education helps "fix" the students with exceptionalities by providing individualized and personalized instruction to meet their unique needs. This is to help students with special needs adjust as quickly as possible to the mainstream of the school and community. Proponents counter that students with special needs are not fully into the mainstream of student life because they are secluded to special education. Some argue that isolating students with special needs may lower their self-esteem and may reduce their ability to deal with other people. In keeping these students in separate classrooms they aren't going to see the struggles and achievements that they can make together. However, at least one study indicated mainstreaming in education has long-term benefits for students as indicated by increased test scores, where the benefit of inclusion has not yet been proved.

=== Limitations for students ===
Educators generally say that some students with special needs are not good candidates for inclusion. Many schools expect a fully included student to be working at or near grade level, but more fundamental requirements exist: First, being included requires that the student is able to attend school. Students that are entirely excluded from school (for example, due to long-term hospitalization), or who are educated outside of schools (for example, due to enrollment in a distance education program) cannot attempt inclusion.

Additionally, some students with special needs are poor candidates for inclusion because of their effect on other students. For example, students with severe behavioral problems, such that they represent a serious physical danger to others, are poor candidates for inclusion, because the school has a duty to provide a safe environment to all students and staff.

Finally, some students are not good candidates for inclusion because the normal activities in a general education classroom will prevent them from learning. For example, a student with severe attention difficulties or extreme sensory processing disorders might be highly distracted or distressed by the presence of other students working at their desks. Inclusion needs to be appropriate to the child's unique needs.

The students that are most commonly included are those with physical disabilities that have no or little effect on their academic work (diabetes mellitus, epilepsy, food allergies, paralysis), students with all types of mild disabilities, and students whose disabilities require relatively few specialized services.

Bowe says that regular inclusion, but not full inclusion, is a reasonable approach for a significant majority of students with special needs. He also says that for some students, notably those with severe autism spectrum disorders or "mental retardation", as well as many who are deaf or have multiple disabilities, even regular inclusion may not offer an appropriate education. Teachers of students with autism spectrum disorders sometimes use antecedent procedures, delayed contingencies, self-management strategies, peer-mediated interventions, pivotal response training and naturalistic teaching strategies.

=== Negative student accounts ===
Even with inclusive education becoming more popular in both the classroom and in society, there are still some students with exceptionalities that are not reaping the benefits of being in a mainstream classroom. Two recent studies show that there is still work to be done when it comes to implementing inclusivity into practice. One researcher studied 371 students from grades 1–6 in 2 urban and 2 rural mainstream elementary schools in Ireland that implemented inclusive education. Students were asked through questionnaire about the social status of their peers – some of whom are on the spectrum (Autism Spectrum Disorder (ASD)) – in relation to play and work contexts. This was to determine if these students were accepted or rejected socially in an inclusive education setting. "Results showed that children with ASD experienced significantly lower levels of social acceptance and higher levels of social rejection". This demonstrates that even though there are practices in place that work to include students with exceptionalities, there are still some who are rejected by their peers.

Many of the placements in mainstream schools with inclusive education are done because they believe the student is academically able, but rarely do they consider if they are socially able to adjust to these circumstances. One research study examined the experiences of students with ASD in inclusive mainstream schools. The 12 students ranged from 11 to 17 years old with varied symptoms and abilities along the autism spectrum. Results showed that all participants experienced feelings of dread, loneliness, and isolation, while being bullied, misunderstood, and unsupported by their peers and teachers. These feelings and exclusion had an impact on their well-being and demonstrated "that mainstream education is not meeting the needs of all with autism deemed mainstream able; a gap exists between inclusion rhetoric and their lived realities in the classroom". This shows that there is still need for improvement on the social conditions within inclusive education settings, as many with exceptionalities are not benefiting from this environment.

==== Responses to negative student accounts ====
These negative accounts are incredibly important to the understanding of inclusive education as a program and pedagogical method. Though inclusive education aims to universally include and provide equitable education to all students regardless of their ability, there is still more that needs to be done. The aforementioned studies show that a key part of inclusive education – or schooling in general – is social relationships and acceptance. Without social relationships, students will feel the very opposite of what feelings should be evoked through inclusivity. This means that educators and even researchers should further inquire about the inclusion rates in schools and learn how students feel about this programming. What is the point of continuing to do something that is meant to help everyone when it clearly does not? Researchers and students with exceptionalities in suggest that there be more collaborative assignments for students, as this provides an opportunity for relationships and social skills to develop. Further, the focus should be on the other students in increasing empathy and embracing difference. Besides improving the interactions between students, there is also the need for educators to evoke change. Students with ASD have provided several strategies to use to improve their quality of education and the interactions that occur in the classroom, with accommodations being carried out that relate to their specific needs. Some accommodations include having clear expectations, providing socialization opportunities, alternative ways to learn and express said learning, and limit sensory distractions or overload in the classroom. Knowing this, students, educators, researchers, and beyond need to conceptualize and implement the idea of inclusive education as one that treats students with exceptionalities equitably and with respect, based on their strengths, needs, interests, background, identity, and zone of proximal development.

== See also ==
- European Agency for Special Needs and Inclusive Education
- Post Secondary Transition For High School Students with Disabilities
- Discrimination in education
- Teaching for social justice
- Mainstreaming in education
- Special Assistance Program (Australian education)
- Circle of friends (disability)
- Accord Coalition for inclusivity on the grounds of religion (England and Wales)
- Education for All Handicapped Children Act
- The Compass Institute Inc Further education and vocational pathways for young people with disabilities
- Right to education
- Universal access to education
- Community integration
- Inclusive education in Latin America
- Least dangerous assumption

== Sources ==
- Ainscow M., Booth T. (2003) The Index for Inclusion: Developing Learning & Participation in Schools. Bristol: Center for Studies in Inclusive Education
- Thomas, G., & Loxley, A. (2007) Deconstructing Special Education and Constructing Inclusion (2nd Edition). Maidenhead: Open University Press.
- Elementary programming for inclusive classrooms
- Social development: Promoting Social Development in the Inclusive Classroom
- M. Mastropieri, Thomas E. Scruggs. The Inclusive Classroom: Strategies for Effective Instruction
- Mary Beth Doyle. The Paraprofessional's Guide to the Inclusive Classroom
- Conrad M., & Whitaker T. (1997). Inclusion and the law: A principal's proactive approach. The Clearing House
- Jorgensen, C., Schuh, M., & Nisbet, J. (2005). The inclusion facilitator's guide. Baltimore: Paul H. Brookes Publishing Co.
- Gunckel, Kristin L., and Felicia M. Moore. "Including Students and Teachers in the Co-Design of the Enacted Curriculum." Eric.ed.gov, 2005, https://files.eric.ed.gov/fulltext/ED498676.pdf.
