= Social (pragmatic) communication disorder =

Neurodevelopmental disorder affecting social communication

- Other names: Pragmatic language impairment, semantic-pragmatic communication disorder
- Specialty: Speech–language pathology, neuropsychology
- Symptoms: Impaired social relatedness, verbal and nonverbal communication skills, and semantic language skills
- Usual onset: Childhood
- Differential diagnosis: Autism spectrum disorder

Social (pragmatic) communication disorder (SPCD), also known as semantic-pragmatic communication disorder, or pragmatic language impairment (PLI), is a neurodevelopmental disorder characterized by difficulties in the social use of verbal and nonverbal communication. Individuals with SPCD struggle to effectively participate in social interactions and interpret social cues, and may struggle to use words appropriately in social contexts.

This disorder can have a profound impact on an individual's ability to establish and maintain relationships, navigate social situations, and participate in academic and professional settings.

While SPCD shares similarities with other communication disorders, such as autism spectrum disorder (ASD), it is recognized as a distinct diagnostic category with its own set of diagnostic criteria and features.

SPCD was granted its own category in the DSM-5 in 2013. The creation of this new category allowed individuals to be considered affected by a form of communication disorder distinct from autism spectrum disorder (ASD). SPCD lacks behaviors associated with restrictions and repetition which are seen in ASD.

== Signs and symptoms ==
Individuals with social communication disorder have particular trouble understanding the meaning of what others are saying. Children with the disorder often exhibit:

- Delayed language development
- Language disorders (similar to the acquired disorder of aphasia) such as word search pauses, jargoning, word order errors, word category errors, and verb tense errors
- Stuttering or cluttering speech
- Repeating words or phrases
- Tendency to be concrete or prefer facts to stories
- Difficulties with:
  - Pronouns or pronoun reversal
  - Understanding questions
  - Understanding choices and making decisions
  - Following conversations or stories (conversations are "off-topic" or "one-sided")
  - Extracting the key points from a conversation or story; they tend to get lost in the details
  - Verb tenses
  - Explaining or describing an event
  - Understanding satire or jokes and contextual cues
  - Reading comprehension
  - Reading body language
  - Making and maintaining friendships and relationships because of delayed language development
  - Distinguishing offensive remarks

According to Bishop and Norbury (2002), children with semantic pragmatic disorder can have fluent, complex articulated expressive language but exhibit problems with the way their language is used. These children typically are verbose. However, they usually have problems understanding and producing connected discourse, instead giving conversational responses that are socially inappropriate, tangential, and stereotyped. They often develop eccentric interests but are not as strong or obsessional as people with autism.

The current view is that the disorder has more to do with communication and information processing than language. For example, children with semantic-pragmatic disorder will often fail to grasp the central meaning or saliency of events. This then leads to an excessive preference for routine and "sameness" (seen in autism spectrum disorder). Individuals often assume a literal communication. This would mean that obvious, concrete instructions are clearly understood and carried out, whereas simple but non-literal expressions such as jokes, sarcasm, and general social chatting are difficult and can lead to misinterpretation. Lies are also a confusing concept to children with SCD as it involves knowing meaning beyond a literal interpretation.

== Diagnosis ==
Because SPCD has been categorized only since 2013, diagnosis is yet to be fully established. In the DSM-5, the child is diagnosed with SPCD if the child does not meet the criteria for other disorders such as ASD.

The DSM-5 categorizes SPCD as a communication disorder within the domain of neurodevelopmental disorders, listed alongside other disorders of speech and language that typically manifest in early childhood.

=== Assessments and tests ===
Common assessments used to identify SPCD are:

1. The developmental, dimensional, and diagnostic interview (3Di)
2. The child communication checklist (CCC)
3. The strengths and difficulties questionnaire (SDQ)
4. Natural Observation
5. Targeted Observation of Pragmatics in Children's Conversations (TOPICC)
6. Analysis of Language Impaired Children's Conversation (ALICC)
7. Structured Observation
8. Test of Language Competence
9. Assessment of Comprehension and Expression (ACE 6‐11)
10. Test of Pragmatic Language
11. Bus story
12. Expression, Reception, and Recall of Narrative Instrument (ERRNI)

Although several tests can be done to try to identify SPCD, some tests are better suited to diagnose SPCD than others. Also, there is not a specific assessment or test that can diagnose SPCD, unlike other disorders such as ASD, DLD, and PLI.

== Treatment ==
Treatments for SPCD are less established than for treatments for other disorders such as autism. Similarities between SPCD and some aspects of autism lead some researchers to try some treatments for autism with people with SPCD.

Speech therapy can help individuals who have communication disorders. Speech and language therapy treatment focuses on communication and social interaction. Speech therapists can work with clients on communication in various settings.

== Similar or related disorders ==
Hyperlexia is a similar but different disorder where the main characteristics are an above-average ability to read with a below-average ability to understand spoken or written language. Joanne Volden wrote an article in 2002 comparing the linguistic weaknesses of children with a nonverbal learning disability to PLI.

=== Differences between SPCD and autism ===
Communication problems are also part of the autism spectrum disorder (autism); however, individuals with autism also show a restricted pattern of behavior, according to behavioral psychologists. The diagnosis of SPCD can only be given if autism has been ruled out. It is assumed that those with autism have difficulty with the meaning of what is being said due to different ways of responding to social situations.

Before the release of the DSM-5 in 2013, SPCD was not differentiated from a diagnosis of autism. However, there were a large number of cases of children experiencing difficulties with pragmatics that did not meet the criteria for autism. The differential diagnosis of SPCD allows practitioners to account for social and communication difficulties which occur to a lesser degree than in children with autism. Social communication disorder is distinguished from autism by the absence of any history (current or past) of restricted or repetitive patterns of interest or behavior in SPCD.

== History ==
In 1983, Rapin and Allen suggested the term "semantic pragmatic disorder" to describe the communicative behavior of children who presented traits such as pathological talkativeness, deficient access to vocabulary and discourse comprehension, atypical choice of terms, and inappropriate conversational skills. They referred to a group of children who presented with mild autistic features and specific semantic pragmatic language problems. In the late 1990s, the term "pragmatic language impairment" (PLI) was proposed.

Rapin and Allen's definition has been expanded and refined by therapists who include communication disorders that involve difficulty in understanding the meaning of words, grammar, syntax, prosody, eye gaze, body language, gestures, or social context. While autistic children exhibit pragmatic language impairment, this type of communication disorder can also be found in individuals with other types of disorders including auditory processing disorders, neuropathies, encephalopathies, and certain genetic disorders.

Before the release of the DSM-5, there was debate over the relationship between semantic-pragmatic disorder and autistic disorder, as the clinical profile of semantic-pragmatic disorder is often seen in children with high-functioning autism. Before the DSM-5 specified SPCD as a separate diagnosis, people with SPCD symptoms were often diagnosed with pervasive developmental disorder not otherwise specified (PDD-NOS).

As mentioned in the introduction, SPCD has only been around since 2013. Before it emerged as its disorder SPCD could have fallen into ASD, PLI, DLD, etc. The reason is that several of these disorders include an issue with social communication. In terms of developmental language disorder (DLD), individuals with this disorder have issues with language form and content and there seems to be no developmental cause. In social environments, DLD seemed to have fewer difficulties than SPCD.

In regards to ASD, ASD behaviors normally involve repetitive behaviors which are normally not present in SPCD. It does not mean that SPCD does not show such behaviors.

PLI tends to be the disorder that is more common to SPCD than the other disorders because both disorders are focused on the pragmatic difficulties individuals have in language with both disorders. SPCD has an element of social communication that is lacking or undeveloped, unlike PLI.

In terms of Specific language impairment, there tend to be a lot of similarities between SCPD and PLI but SLI deals with Semantic-Pragmatic issues. This means that several issues fall into Semantic-Pragmatic issues such as uncommon word choice, speaking to oneself out loud and interesting, unimpaired phonology, and syntax.

== See also ==
- Alexithymia
- Asperger syndrome
- Attention deficit hyperactivity disorder (ADHD)
- High-functioning autism
- Nonverbal learning disorder
- PDD not otherwise specified
