= Expressive language disorder =

- Specialty: Pediatrics Speech-Language Pathology
- Symptoms: Struggle to describe or explain something
- Usual onset: Early Childhood
- Risk factors: Family History; Injury; Brain Tumor; Infection; Autism
- Treatment: Speech and Language Therapy

Expressive language disorder is one of the "specific developmental disorders of speech and language" recognized by the tenth edition of the International Classification of Diseases (ICD-10). As of the eleventh edition (ICD-11, current 1 January 2022), it is considered to be covered by the various categories of developmental language disorder. Transition to the ICD-11 will take place at a different time in different countries.

The condition is a communication disorder in which there are difficulties with verbal and written expression. It is a specific language impairment characterized by an ability to use expressive spoken language that is markedly below the appropriate level for the mental age, but with a language comprehension that is within normal limits. There can be problems with vocabulary, producing complex sentences, and remembering words, and there may or may not be abnormalities in articulation.

Careful diagnosis is also important because "atypical language development can be a secondary characteristic of other physical and developmental problems that may first manifest as language problems".

== Causes ==
Expressive language disorder is not well understood. It does not have one singular cause, but rather is often a result of many possible causes during development including malnutrition, and damage to the cerebrum such as from injury or disease. Physical abnormalities such as cleft plate and other anomalies that affect oral, pharyngeal, laryngeal structures or neuromuscular functions can be a cause of expressive language disorder by interfering with the patients ability to communicate directly. Environmental problems during early childhood development, including inadequate stimulus, are risk factors as well.

== Symptoms ==
Expressive language disorder is characterized by difficulty communicating in varied ways. Sometimes this manifests as below-average vocabulary skills for an individuals age or use of the incorrect tense when speaking. There can be difficulty forming complex sentences and remembering words. Difficulties are with expression, not with understanding as with Receptive Language Disorder

== Diagnosis ==
Diagnosis for expressive language disorder in children are usually marked by milestones markers of the child age grouping. A child can be diagnosed for expressive language disorder as early as two years old. Many pediatricians and speech and language pathologists look into all grounds of what may be causing speech delay. By the age of 2, children who are unable to use up to 270 one-word phrases and 25 different phonemes, not averaging 75 words per hour during free play, not able to talk in several two-to-three-word phrases with speech intelligibility or at least 65%, and those who are unable to name common objects and pictures are predicted to most likely struggle and be diagnosed with expressive language disorder. In addition, it is also recommended to have a hearing test to diagnosis if the children's ability to communicate is altered by hearing problems. Since age vary on diagnosis, treatment varies as well.

== Treatment ==
Treatment of expressive language disorder does not require medicine most of the time, but instead involves speech and language therapies. However, it is recommended to get a full physical check to rule out other possible disorders such as hearing loss. The recommended way to treat expressive language disorder is to work out a therapy plan by visiting a speech and language therapist. Some therapies may include use of toys, books, figures, and images to help improve the condition. In addition, parents could also aid children at home. For example, parents could have a small conversation with their children with slow, clear, and short words to gradually improve children's condition. In this process, patience is key, and it is also important to not make the children stressed. Additionally, let children repeat a short sentence or say it in their own words could also be helpful. Early diagnosis and treatment is really important to treat expressive language disorder.

== Prognosis ==
The prognosis of this disease is shown to be associated with a class of different issues ranging from broad areas of development in a child's life quality such as social relationships, mental health, literacy, academic abilities, community connections, etc. This is tied into the inability to properly communicate or express language due to the plethora of functional impairments that come with this disorder. Risk detection as well as the severity of the disease has also been linked to age and analyzed through the measurement of the ways these areas have been affected as the child reaches adolescence or adulthood. Additionally, an expressive language disorder that is not caused by any underlying diseases such as autism or brain tumors has been shown to be curable through means that do not involve direct forms of treatment such as medication. A variety of speech and language therapies which include the use of pictures, books, and much more have led to improvements in overall expression, encourages children to participate in many activities, helps them make more friends, and reduces the stress in parents and children. However, if the condition is not treated, it will cause the children to have a decreased performance in school and increased frustration in both the parents and children due to difficulties in communication. In order to tackle and navigate through these difficulties, it is highly recommended for parents to seek out a speech language pathologist and to incorporate a routine that aids the child's condition at home such as an atmosphere where the encouragement for questions and active communications is endorsed. Activities such as reading to the child or the introductions to new words on objects or signs, would be good examples.

== Models of language production ==
Willem Levelt outlined the currently accepted theory of speech production. Words are produced after the concept waiting to be produced is conceptualized, related words are selected, encoded and the sound waves of speech are produced.

== Association with language networks ==
There is significant debate about whether specific language impairments, such as expressive language disorder, are caused by deficits in grammar or by a deficit in processing language information. However, an alternative hypothesis to the cause of SLIs has been posited, called the Procedural Deficit Hypothesis. The Procedural Deficit Hypothesis states that we can explain language impairments due to abnormal development of brain structures that are involved in procedural memory, our memories that remember how to perform different cognitive and motor tasks. The procedural memory system is associated with basal-ganglia circuits in the frontal lobe and further investigation of this particular hypothesis could aid in the development of a clinical neurological picture of what the underlying causes of SLI are.

== History ==
=== Scientific studies of speech and language ===
Some of the earliest discoveries in the field of neuroscience were related to the discovery that damage to certain areas of the brain related to impairments in language, such as the discovery of Wernicke's area and Broca's area. Lesions in these parts of the brain impair language comprehension and language production, respectively. Paul Broca was the first to note that the left hemisphere of the brain appeared to be localized for language function, particularly for right handed patients. Modern neuroscientific research has verified this, though language may be lateralized to the right hemisphere in some right-handed individuals.

=== Developmental verbal dyspraxia ===
In 1990, it was reported that the several generations of the KE family had developmental verbal dyspraxia and orofacial praxis that were inherited in a typical autosomal dominant pattern. Further analysis traced this inheritance pattern back to mutations in the FOXP2 genes. These studies have allowed scientists to begin to investigate how changes to one gene can alter human communication.

FOXP2 is the first gene that has been identified that is specifically linked to speech and language production. Mutant alleles of the normal FOXP2 gene have been found to be the cause of severe speech impairments.

=== Specific language impairment ===
Neuroimaging techniques, such as structural and functional MRI, found no significant differences between individuals with SLI and normal controls. However, more subtle and sophisticated techniques, such as voxel-based morphometry studies have allowed researchers to identify bilateral abnormalities in neural volume in areas of the brain associated with motor functions, such as the caudate nucleus, in the affected members of the KE family when compared to the unaffected family members. This volume reduction showed a high correlation between reduced volume and tests of oral praxis, supporting the idea that odd development of the caudate nucleus is related to the problems in motor control observed in the KE family.

Due to the vague nature of the diagnosis of expressive language disorder, there is little specific scientific research that we can currently locate. A larger body of research exists around neuroscientific studies with children diagnosed with a specific language impairment (SLI). fMRI studies have shown that children with SLI have a significantly smaller left hemispheric pars triangularis (Broca's area) and asymmetry of dominance of language structures, as opposed to the more typical left hemisphere dominance. Scientists are beginning to elucidate differences in activation patterns in children with SLIs using neuroimaging techniques to capture brain activity while performing different cognitive tasks. A major observation is lack of left hemisphere lateralization in major language structures such as the inferior frontal gyrus-opercularis, inferior frontal gyrus-triangularis, supramarginal gyrus and superior temporal gyrus. The same study reported hypoactivation and hyper activation of other brain regions - the supramarginal junction and anterior insula, respectively. Other in-depth imaging studies report finding previously undiagnosed lesions in the brains of children with well-characterized developmental language development. Together, these findings strongly suggest that language impairments are the result of an underlying neurological defect in an area of the brain related to language.

Studies looking at long-term outcomes for individuals with specific language impairments such as expressive language disorder track these individuals from childhood to adulthood. As Whitehouse and his colleagues suggest, "When childhood language problems persist into adulthood, they can have far reaching consequences in terms of academic, social and vocational outcomes." These researchers found that children diagnosed with an SLI would have persistent problems with language and are more likely to pursue vocational training rather than university, thereby avoiding professions requiring high levels of literacy. A lower socioeconomic status was also noted by adults who were diagnosed with an SLI as a child. Whitehouse also reported that these adults had more difficulties in establishing friendships, most likely due to a decreased ability to express themselves socially.

== Current educational interventions for students with an SLI ==
Specific language impairments are often secondary characteristics of other disorders such as autism spectrum disorder and attention deficit hyperactivity disorder. In these cases, issues with speech and language are often not treated specifically, but rather attention is given to the primary complaint. Due to the high correlation of an SLI with other disorders, it is difficult to tell the difference between "pure SLI" or language impairments due to the presence of another disorder.

== See also ==
- Auditory processing disorder
- Speech-Language Pathology
- Mixed receptive-expressive language disorder
