= Mixed receptive-expressive language disorder =

Communication disorder

- Specialty: Psychiatry

Mixed receptive-expressive language disorder (DSM-IV 315.32) is a communication disorder in which both the receptive and expressive areas of communication may be affected in any degree, from mild to severe. Children with this disorder have difficulty understanding words and sentences. This impairment is classified by deficiencies in expressive and receptive language development that is not attributed to sensory deficits, nonverbal intellectual deficits, a neurological condition, environmental deprivation or psychiatric impairments. Research illustrates that 2% to 4% of five year olds have mixed receptive-expressive language disorder. This distinction is made when children have issues in expressive language skills, the production of language, and when children also have issues in receptive language skills, the understanding of language. Those with mixed receptive-language disorder have a normal left-right anatomical asymmetry of the planum temporale and parietale. This is attributed to a reduced left hemisphere functional specialization for language. Taken from a measure of cerebral blood flow (SPECT) in phonemic discrimination tasks, children with mixed receptive-expressive language disorder do not exhibit the expected predominant left hemisphere activation. Mixed receptive-expressive language disorder is also known as receptive-expressive language impairment (RELI) or receptive language disorder.

== Classification ==
If assessed on the Wechsler Adult Intelligence Scale, for instance, symptoms of mixed receptive-expressive language disorder may show as relatively low scores for Information, Vocabulary and Comprehension (perhaps below the 25th percentile). If a person has difficulty with specific types of concepts, for example spatial terms, such as 'over', 'under', 'here' and 'there', they may also have difficulties with arithmetic, understanding word problems and instructions, or difficulties using words at all. They may also have a more general problem with words or sentences, both comprehension and orally. Some children will have issues with pragmatics – the use of language in social contexts as well; and therefore, will have difficulty with inferring meaning. Furthermore, they have severe impairment of spontaneous language production and for this reason, they have difficulty in formulating questions. Generally, children will have trouble with morphosyntax, which is word inflections. These children have difficulty understanding and applying grammatical rules, such as endings that mark verb tenses (e.g. -ed), third-person singular verbs (e.g. I think, he thinks), plurals (e.g. -s), auxiliary verbs that denote tenses (e.g. was running, is running), and with determiners (the, a). Moreover, children with mixed receptive-expressive language disorders have deficits in completing two cognitive operations at the same time and learning new words or morphemes under time pressure or when processing demands are high. These children also have auditory processing deficits in which they process auditory information at a slower rate and as a result, require more time for processing.

== Presentation ==
=== Related disorders ===
Studies show that low receptive and expressive language at young ages was correlated to increased autism symptom severity in children in their early school years. Below is a chart depicting language deficits of children on the autistic spectrum. This table indicates the lower levels of language processing, receptive/expressive disorders, which is more severe in children with autism. When autistic children speak, they are often difficult to understand, their language is sparse and dysfluent, they speak in single, uninflected words or short phrases, and their supply of words is severely depleted. This leads to limited vocabulary while also having deficits in verbal short-term memory.

Aspect of language	Lower level receptive/expressive disorders
Comprehension:	
Phonology	Very impaired
Syntax	Very impaired
Semantics	Very impaired
Pragmatics	Very impaired
Prosody	Very impaired
Production:	
Phonology	Very impaired
Syntax	Very impaired
Semantics	Very impoverished
Pragmatics	Very impaired
Prosody	Often impaired, monotonous, robotics
Amount of language	Sparse or absent
Fluency	Dysfluent

== Management ==
Children who demonstrate deficiencies early in their speech and language development are at risk for continued speech and language issues throughout later childhood. Similarly, even if these speech and language problems have been resolved, children with early language delay are more at risk for difficulties in phonological awareness, reading, and writing throughout their lives. Children with mixed receptive-expressive language disorder are often likely to have long-term implications for language development, literacy, behavior, social development, and even mental health problems. If suspected of having a mixed receptive-expressive language disorder, treatment is available from a speech therapist or pathologist. Most treatments are short term, and rely upon accommodations made within the environment, in order to minimize interfering with work or school. Programs that involve intervention planning that link verbal short-term memory with visual/nonverbal information may be helpful for these children. In addition, approaches such as parent training for language stimulation and monitoring language through the "watch and see" method are recommended. The watch-and-see technique advises children with mixed receptive-expressive language disorder who come from stable, middle-class homes without any other behavioral, medical, or hearing problems should be vigilantly monitored rather than receive intervention. It is often the case that children do not meet the eligibility criteria established through a comprehensive oral language evaluation; and as a result, are not best suited for early intervention programs and require a different approach besides the "one size fits all" model.

== See also ==
- Expressive language disorder
