= Raymond D. Kent =

American speech scientist and professor emeritus

- Known for: acoustic analysis of speech, Speech motor control, childhood speech development and disorders, Motor speech disorders
- Awards: Honors of the American Speech–Language–Hearing Association (1994); Docteur Honoris Causa, Université de Montréal; Honorary Doctorate, University of Oulu; Honorary Professor, University of Queensland; Visiting Erskine Fellow, University of Canterbury
- Scientific career
- Fields: Speech science, communication disorders, Acoustic phonetics, Motor speech disorders
- Institutions: University of Wisconsin–Madison (Professor Emeritus)

Raymond D. Kent is an American speech scientist and professor emeritus of communication sciences and disorders at the University of Wisconsin–Madison. He is known for his research in acoustic phonetics, speech motor control, childhood speech development and disorders, and motor speech disorders such as dysarthria.

Kent has authored or edited 18 books and more than 250 journal articles, book chapters, and reviews in speech science and speech-language pathology.

== Career ==
Kent is Professor Emeritus in the Department of Communication Sciences and Disorders at the University of Wisconsin–Madison. He has held several editorial positions, serving as editor of the Journal of Speech and Hearing Research (predecessor to the Journal of Speech, Language, and Hearing Research), associate founding editor of Clinical Linguistics & Phonetics, and associate editor of Folia Phoniatrica et Logopaedica.

== Research ==
Kent's research has centered on acoustic analysis of speech, vocal tract development, speech intelligibility in clinical populations, and the study of speech motor control and its disorders. A 2007 collection of essays titled Motor Speech Disorders: Essays for Ray Kent, edited by colleague Gary Weismer and published by Plural Publishing, was produced in his honor and reflects the impact of his work on the field of motor speech disorders.

== Honors and awards ==
In 1994, Kent received the Honors of the American Speech–Language–Hearing Association, the association's highest award recognizing distinguished contributions to the discipline of communication sciences and disorders.

Additional honors include:

- Docteur Honoris Causa (honorary doctorate) from Université de Montréal
- Honorary doctorate from the University of Oulu, Finland
- Honorary Professor at the University of Queensland, Australia
- Visiting Erskine Fellow at the University of Canterbury, New Zealand

These awards are documented in his professional biography.

== Selected bibliography ==
- Shriberg, L.D., Kent, R.D., McAllister, T., Preston, J.L., & Speights, M.L. (2027). Clinical phonetics (6th ed.). Plural Publishing.
- Kent, Raymond D. (2024). Handbook on Children’s Speech: Development, Disorders, and Variations. Plural Publishing.
- Kent, Raymond D., & Bunta, Ferenc (2026). Acoustic Methods for Speech Science. Plural Publishing.
- Kent, Raymond D., & Read, Charles (1992). The Acoustic Analysis of Speech. Singular Publishing Group (with later editions).

== See also ==
- Motor speech disorders
- Acoustic phonetics
