= Laura L. Koenig =

American linguist

Laura L. Koenig is an American linguist and speech scientist.

She is a professor of communication sciences and disorders at Adelphi University. She conducted her thesis work at Haskins Laboratories, and continues there as a Senior Scientist working on differences in laryngeal function across normal populations (men, women, and children) and on the development of speech production in children. Web of Science reports 20 papers in peer-reviewed journals, with over 200 citations. Much of her current work is conducted in collaboration with Jorge C. Lucero of the University of Brasília. She teaches courses in phonetics, linguistics, acoustics, speech science, and research design, and is an Associate Editor for speech production of the Journal of the Acoustical Society of America.

== Representative publications ==
- Koenig, L.L; Lucero, J.C.; Perlman, E. (2008). "Speech production variability in fricatives of children and adults: Results of functional data analysis". Journal of the Acoustical Society of America. 124 (5): 3158–3170. Bibcode:2008ASAJ..124.3158K. doi:10.1121/1.2981639. PMC 2677351. PMID 19045800.
- Lucero, J. C.; Koenig, L. L. (2007). "On the relation of the phonation threshold lung pressure with the oscillation frequency of the vocal folds". Journal of the Acoustical Society of America. 121 (6): 3280–3283. doi:10.1121/1.2722210. PMID 17552679.
- Koenig, L. L.; Mencl, W. E.; Lucero, J. C. (2005). "Multidimensional analyses of voicing offsets and onsets in female speakers". Journal of the Acoustical Society of America. 118 (4): 2535–2550. Bibcode:2005ASAJ..118.2535K. doi:10.1121/1.2033572. PMID 16266174.
- Lucero, J. C.; Koenig, L. L. (2005). "Phonation thresholds as a function of laryngeal size in a two-mass model of the vocal folds". Journal of the Acoustical Society of America. 118 (5): 2798–2801. Bibcode:2005ASAJ..118.2798L. doi:10.1121/1.2074987. PMID 16334896.
- Lucero, J.; Koenig, L. L. (2004). "Simulations of temporal patterns of oral airflow in men and women using a two-mass model of the vocal folds under dynamic control". Journal of the Acoustical Society of America. 117 (3): 1362–1372. doi:10.1121/1.1853235. PMID 15807024.
- Koenig, L. L. (2001). "Distributional characteristics of VOT in children's voiceless aspirated stops and interpretation of developmental trends". Journal of Speech, Language, and Hearing Research. 44 (5): 1058–1068. doi:10.1044/1092-4388(2001/084). PMID 11708527.
- Koenig, L. L. (2000). "Laryngeal factors in voiceless consonant production in men, women, and 5-year-olds". Journal of Speech, Language, and Hearing Research. 43 (5): 1211–1228. doi:10.1044/jslhr.4305.1211. PMID 11063242.
- Lucero, J.; Koenig, L. L. (2000). "Time normalization of voice signals using Functional Data Analysis". Journal of the Acoustical Society of America. 108 (4): 1408–1420. Bibcode:2000ASAJ..108.1408L. doi:10.1121/1.1289206. PMID 11051467.
- Löfqvist, A.; Koenig, L. L.; McGowan, R. S. (1995). "Vocal tract aerodynamics in /aCa/ utterances: Measurements". Speech Communication. 16: 49–66. doi:10.1016/0167-6393(94)00049-G.
- McGowan, R. S.; Koenig, L. L.; Löfqvist, A. (1995). "Vocal tract aerodynamics in /aCa/ utterances: Simulations". Speech Communication. 16: 67–88. doi:10.1016/0167-6393(94)00049-G.

== Memberships ==
She is a member of the Acoustical Society of America (ASA), American Association for the Advancement of Science (AAAS), Linguistic Society of America (LSA), and the New York State Speech-Language-Hearing Association (NYSSHLA).
