= Infantilism =

Infantilism may refer to:

- Infantilism (physiological disorder), obsolete use of the term for some developmental disorders and disabilities
- Infantile speech, also known as infantilism, a speech disorder in which early speech stages persist beyond the age they are normally expected to fade
- Paraphilic infantilism, a paraphilia involving the desire to wear diapers and/or fantasies of a return to infancy
- Psychosexual infantilism, a concept in psychosexual development introduced by Sigmund Freud
- Sexual infantilism, a synonym for delayed puberty
