= Revoicer =

A revoicer provides communication assistance by carefully listening to the speech patterns uttered by an individual with a speech disability, using lipreading (speechreading) and attention to other cues if necessary for full understanding of the utterances, and then repeats the same words in a manner that is more clear and understandable to the listener. Revoicers generally have excellent skills in auditory phonetic/phonemic pattern recognition similar to those utilized by a court reporter or stenographer, to identify the sounds of speech (phonemic sounds) of the speaker.

== Professional revoicers ==
Professional revoicers are requested and utilized by individuals with speech disabilities, and are paid in the same manner as other auxiliary service providers for persons with communication-related disabilities. In the United States, professional revoicers are compensated pursuant to the federal Americans with Disabilities Act of 1990, Section 3, and the Americans with Disabilities Act Amendments of 2008.

== Types of professional revoicers ==
- Professional revoicers are used by individuals with speech disabilities who have normal or near-normal hearing ability.
- Professional DHH revoicers are used by individuals whose speech disabilities were caused by early severe or profound bilateral (both ears) hearing loss who wish to speak in their own words and with their own voices. The professional DHH revoicer is usually highly experienced and is able to function in a dual capacity—acting as a professional revoicer for expressive communications (utilizing lipreading (speechreading) and gestural cues, if necessary), and also acting as a communication assistant for receptive communications (using any method preferred and chosen by the person with the speech disability).

== Professional revoicers for telephone communications ==
Professional Revoicers are also used by telephone companies, under the STS Relay System first established by Robert Segalman, Ph.D., who established the nonprofit organization, Speech Communication Assistance by Telephone Inc (SCT). The STS Relay System uses professional revoicers as Speech-to-Speech Communication Assistants (STS C.A.s). The STS C.A. Revoices the words of the person with a speech disability so that the other person on the call can understand him or her. The STS Relay System is now available at no cost to persons with speech disabilities in many countries. In the United States, the STS Relay System is monitored by the United States Federal Communications Commission, and can be accessed by dialing 711 on any voice telephone and requesting STS Relay Service.

== Other assistive technologies ==
In some situations, technologies such as computerized speech generating devices (also known as voice synthesizers, where a computerized voice is heard by the listeners), are used by some individuals with speech disabilities. However, these systems may not work in some situations. And in other situations, the individual with the speech disability may not be able to effectively utilize these types of devices, due to additional disability difficulties or in situations where interpersonal spoken communication is rapidly paced.

== Criticism of revoicing in the criminal justice system ==
The use of revoicing in criminal trials has been compared to the now widely discredited use of other types of facilitated communication, which is believed to have resulted in innocent people being accused of crimes. One concern is focused on the tendency of the revoicer to have some bias in favor of the alleged victims, as many people claiming to be revoicers available for court testimony also have association with victim advocacy groups.
