= Peabody Picture Vocabulary Test =

The Peabody Picture Vocabulary Test, the 2007 edition of which is known as the PPVT-IV, is an untimed test of receptive vocabulary for Standard American English and is intended to provide a quick estimate of the examinee's receptive vocabulary ability. It can be used with the Expressive Vocabulary Test-Second Edition (EVT-2) to make a direct comparison between the examinee's receptive and expressive vocabulary skills. The PPVT was developed in 1959 by special education specialists Lloyd M. Dunn and Leota M. Dunn. The current version lists L.M. Dunn and his son D.M. Dunn as authors.

== Procedure ==
The test is given verbally and takes between twenty and thirty minutes to complete. No reading is required by the individual, and scoring is rapid. For its administration, the examiner presents a series of pictures to each person. There are four pictures to a page, and each is numbered. The examiner speaks a word describing one of the pictures and asks the individual to point to or say the number of the picture that the word describes. Item responses can also be made by multiple choice selection depending on the age of the person being tested. The total score can be converted to a percentile rank, mental age, or a standard deviation IQ score. Although desirable, no special training is required to properly administer and score the PPVT-IV. The test publisher recommends that anyone interpreting or explaining the test scores should have knowledge in psychological testing and statistics.

== Changes from previous edition ==
The national norms of the PPVT-III were extended to include ages 2 years and 6 months through 90+ years of age. The PPVT-IV was developed from adult norms obtained on 828 persons ages 19 to 40 selected to be nationally representative of geographical regions and major occupational groups. No people with handicaps were included in the norm population. Two parallel forms (A and B) can be used for testing and retesting.

== Clinical use ==
The PPVT-IV provides an estimate of the client's verbal intelligence and has been administered to groups who had reading or speech problems, had intellectual disability, or were emotionally withdrawn. Studies of earlier versions of the test suggested that it tended to underestimate full-scale IQ scores for both intellectually disabled and gifted test-takers. Because the manner of the individual's response to stimulus vocabulary is to point in any fashion to one of four pictures that best fits the stimulus work, these tests also apply to rehabilitation of individuals who have multiple physical impairments, but whose hearing and vision are intact. The PPVT-IV can also be used for assessing the English vocabulary of non-English-speaking individuals and assessing adult verbal ability.

PPVT clinical research publications include thousands of references. To organize PPVT publications into groupings, two different types of database searches for PPVT publications were completed. The first search quarried the American Psychological Association PsycNET. The second search quarried the American Psychological Association PsycINFO.

=== E-assessments research ===
Due to known validity and reliability coefficients of the PPVT since the early 1970s, the PPVT provided an instrument against which questions related to mechanized testing systems could be studied. Mechanized testing systems were testing systems which integrated equipment such as slide projectors and tape players to administer the PPVT. One mechanized testing system employed a Digital Equipment Corporation PDP-12 computer, interfaced with a Universal Digital Controller to control the random access audio system and the slide projector. The PDP-12 was equipped with a Teletype Model 33 and was interfaced with an oscilloscope so that, during PPVT testing, the status readout of the item number and correctness of response of the last item completed to administer the PPVT could be determined.

An e-assessment project, published in the mid-1980s, conducted an examination of both test validity and test reliability using a personal computer (Apple II) for administering the Peabody Picture Vocabulary Test-Revised (PPVT-R) compared to a traditional paper and pencil administration. During the computer-based administration, students' only interaction with an adult occurred when they were led from their classroom to the school library, where each student was seated at a table with the Apple II computer. They were informed that the computer would administer the directions and that they could press the space bar on the computer keyboard to repeat any instructions or words if needed. The PPVT-R software program verbally delivered the test instructions and presented the visual sample test items. After each student met the standard for administering the PPVT-R, the software program followed the PPVT-R standard test instructions, verbally presenting the stimulus word while displaying the visual choices. The software administration also included offering verbal praise to the child for correct responses when appropriate and informing each student when the test was completed.

As computer-human technology improves, future PPVT e-assessments research may include use of visual tracking computer interface such as wearable eye tracking glasses so that disabled adults can respond to PPVT test items by scanning the visual field and fixing their eye gaze on the visual item they select.

Future PPVT e-assessment research could integrate the human nervous system with e-administration of the PPVT. The human nervous system e-assessment would involve assessment of the P300 (P3) wave event related potential (ERP) between visual picture test items and the picture word comparing and contrasting the correct pairing of the word and picture against incorrect pairing of words and pictures. Use of the PPVT with cognitive disabled individuals and their response to the P3 ERP waveform could be used as a measure for the efficacy of various treatments on cognitive function.

== Limits ==
The test is not useful in its present form for blind and deaf people, but can be useful for people with intellectual disability without modification of the test administration procedure. A possible problem with the test for adults is that the illustrations for about the first fifty items typically feature children, and thus may not be appropriate for adult subjects with intellectual disability.
