= STS relay =

STS relay is the speech-to-speech relay service available to any telephone callers or callees with speech disability and to those who wish to talk with them.

== In the US ==
STS Relay is available via 711 in the US through the Telecommunications Relay Service; in a telephone call, first dial 711, then ask for STS. A trained communication assistant will ask you what number you want to call. The assistant will repeat what the caller with the speech disability is saying. The callee can then respond. The caller can then reply. The communication assistant will revoice the caller's message. The callee then responds in this three-way assisted phone conversation.

== In other countries ==
The service is available in Australia, Sweden, and in other nations on a trial basis. STS Relay on the PSTN (public switch telephone network) is available for those who need telephone call assistance because of a speech disability.

== History ==
STS Relay first became available in the US in California, in 1997; the service became available nationally March 1, 2001.

On May 12, 2006, the University of Wisconsin - Madison awarded Robert Z. Segalman, PhD (UW 1972), an honorary Doctor of Science for his work in creating Speech To Speech.
