= Apraxia of speech =

Inability to translate mental speech plans into enunciated sounds

- Other names: Verbal apraxia, speech sound disorder, developmental speech sound disorder
- Symptoms: Oral motor planning, speech delay

Apraxia of speech (AOS), also called verbal apraxia, is a speech sound disorder affecting an individual's ability to translate conscious speech plans into motor plans, which results in limited and difficult speech ability. By the definition of apraxia, AOS affects volitional (willful or purposeful) movement pattern. However, AOS usually also affects automatic speech.

People with AOS have difficulty connecting speech messages from the brain to the mouth. AOS is a loss of prior speech ability resulting from a brain injury such as a stroke or progressive illness.

Developmental verbal dyspraxia (DVD), also known as childhood apraxia of speech (CAS) and developmental apraxia of speech (DAS), is an inability to utilize motor planning to perform movements necessary for speech during a child's language learning process. Although the causes differ between AOS and DVD, the main characteristics and treatments are similar.

== Presentation ==
Apraxia of speech (AOS) is a neurogenic communication disorder affecting the motor programming system for speech production. Individuals with AOS demonstrate difficulty in speech production, specifically with sequencing and forming sounds. The Levelt model describes the speech production process in the following three consecutive stages: conceptualization, formulation, and articulation. According to the Levelt model, apraxia of speech would fall into the articulation region. The individual does not have a language deficiency, but has difficulty in the production of language in an audible manner. Notably, this difficulty is limited to vocal speech, and does not affect sign-language production. The individual knows exactly what they want to say, but there is a disruption in the part of the brain that sends the signal to the muscle for the specific movement. Individuals with acquired AOS demonstrate hallmark characteristics of articulation and prosody (rhythm, stress or intonation) errors. Coexisting characteristics may include groping and effortful speech production with self-correction, difficulty initiating speech, abnormal stress, intonation and rhythm errors, and inconsistency with articulation.

Wertz et al., (1984) describe the following five speech characteristics that an individual with apraxia of speech may exhibit:

Effortful trial and error with groping
Groping is when the mouth searches for the position needed to create a sound. When this trial and error process occurs, sounds may be held out longer, repeated or silently voiced. In some cases, someone with AOS may be able to produce certain sounds on their own, easily and unconsciously, but when prompted by another to produce the same sound the patient may grope with their lips, using volitional control (conscious awareness of the attempted speech movements), while struggling to produce the sound.
Self correction of errors
Patients are aware of their speech errors and can attempt to correct themselves. This can involve distorted consonants, vowels, and sound substitutions. People with AOS often have a much greater understanding of speech than they are able to express. This receptive ability allows them to attempt self correction.
Abnormal rhythm, stress and intonation
People with AOS present with prosodic errors which include irregular pitch, rate, and rhythm. This impaired prosody causes their speech to be: too slow or too fast and highly segmented (many pauses). An AOS speaker also stresses syllables incorrectly and in a monotone. As a result, the speech is often described as 'robotic'. When words are produced in a monotone with equal syllabic stress, a word such as 'tectonic' may sound like 'tec-ton-ic' as opposed to 'tec-TON-ic'. These patterns occur even though the speakers are aware of the prosodic patterns that should be used.
Inconsistent articulation errors on repeated speech productions of the same utterance
When producing the same utterance in different instances, a person with AOS may have difficulty using and maintaining the same articulation that was previously used for that utterance. On some days, people with AOS may have more errors, or seem to "lose" the ability to produce certain sounds for an amount of time. Articulation also becomes more difficult when a word or phrase requires an articulation adjustment, in which the lips and tongue must move in order to shift between sounds. For example, the word "baby" needs less mouth adjustment than the word "dog" requires, since producing "dog" requires two tongue/lips movements to articulate.
Difficulty initiating utterances
Producing utterances becomes a difficult task in patients with AOS, which results in various speech errors. The errors in completing a speech movement gesture may increase as the length of the utterance increases. Since multisyllabic words are difficult, those with AOS use simple syllables and a limited range of consonants and vowels.

== Causes ==
Apraxia of speech can be caused by impairment to parts of the brain that control muscle movement and speech. However, identifying a particular region of the brain in which AOS always occurs has been controversial. Various patients with damage to left subcortical structures, regions of the insula, and Broca's area have been diagnosed with AOS. Most commonly it is triggered by vascular lesions, but AOS can also arise due to tumors and trauma.

=== Acute apraxia of speech ===
Stroke-associated AOS is the most common form of acquired AOS, making up about 60% of all reported acquired AOS cases. This is one of the several possible disorders that can result from a stroke, but only about 11% of stroke cases involve this disorder. Brain damage to the neural connections, and especially the neural synapses, during the stroke can lead to acquired AOS. Most cases of stroke-associated AOS are minor, but in the most severe cases, all linguistic motor function can be lost and must be relearned. Since most with this form of AOS are at least fifty years old, few fully recover to their previous level of ability to produce speech.

Other disorders and injuries of the brain that can lead to AOS include (traumatic) dementia, progressive neurological disorders, and traumatic brain injury.

=== Progressive apraxia of speech ===
Recent research has established the existence of primary progressive apraxia of speech caused by neuroanatomic motor atrophy. For a long time, this disorder was not distinguished from other motor speech disorders such as dysarthria and in particular primary progressive aphasia. Many studies have been done trying to identify areas in the brain in which this particular disorder occurs or at least to show that it occurs in different areas of the brain than other disorders. One study observed 37 patients with neurodegenerative speech disorders to determine whether or not it is distinguishable from other disorders, and if so where in the brain it can be found. Using speech and language, neurological, neuropsychological and neuroimaging testing, the researchers came to the conclusion that PAS does exist and that it correlates to superior lateral premotor and supplementary motor atrophy. However, because PAS is such a rare and recently discovered disorder, many studies do not have enough subjects to observe to make data entirely conclusive.

== Diagnosis ==
Apraxia of speech can be diagnosed by a speech language pathologist (SLP) through specific exams that measure oral mechanisms of speech. The oral mechanisms exam involves tasks such as pursing lips, blowing, licking lips, elevating the tongue, and also involves an examination of the mouth. A complete exam also involves observation of the patient eating and talking. SLPs do not agree on a specific set of characteristics that make up the apraxia of speech diagnosis, so any of the characteristics from the section above could be used to form a diagnosis. Patients may be asked to perform other daily tasks such as reading, writing, and conversing with others. In situations involving brain damage, an MRI brain scan also helps identify damaged areas of the brain.

A differential diagnosis must be used in order to rule out other similar or alternative disorders. Although disorders such as expressive aphasia, conduction aphasia, and dysarthria involve similar symptoms as apraxia of speech, the disorders must be distinguished in order to correctly treat the patients. While AOS involves the motor planning or processing stage of speech, aphasic disorders can involve other language processes.

According to Ziegler et al., this difficulty in diagnosis derives from the unknown causes and function of the disorder, making it hard to set definite parameters for AOS identification. Specifically, he explains that oral-facial apraxia, dysarthria, and aphasic phonological impairment are the three distinctly different disorders that cause individuals to display symptoms that are often similar to those of someone with AOS, and that these close relatives must be correctly ruled out by a Speech Language Pathologist before AOS can be given as a diagnosis. In this way, AOS is a diagnosis of exclusion, and is generally recognized when all other similar speech sound production disorders are eliminated.

=== Possible co-morbid aphasias ===
AOS and expressive aphasia (also known as Broca's aphasia) are commonly mistaken as the same disorder mainly because they often occur together in patients. Although both disorders present with symptoms such as a difficulty producing sounds due to damage in the language parts of the brain, they are not the same. The main difference between these disorders lies in the ability to comprehend spoken language; patients with apraxia are able to fully comprehend speech, while patients with aphasia are not always fully able to comprehend others' speech.

Conduction aphasia is another speech disorder that is similar to, but not the same as, apraxia of speech. Although patients with conduction aphasia have full comprehension of speech, as do those with AOS, there are differences between the two disorders. Patients with conduction aphasia are typically able to speak fluently, but they do not have the ability to repeat what they hear.

Similarly, dysarthria, another motor speech disorder, is characterized by difficulty articulating sounds. The difficulty in articulation does not occur due in planning the motor movement, as happens with AOS. Instead, dysarthria is caused by inability in or weakness of the muscles in the mouth, face, and respiratory system.

== Management ==
In cases of acute AOS (stroke), spontaneous recovery may occur, in which previous speech abilities reappear on their own. All other cases of acquired AOS require a form of therapy; however the therapy varies with the individual needs of the patient. Typically, treatment involves one-on-one therapy with a speech language pathologist (SLP). For severe forms of AOS, therapy may involve multiple sessions per week, which is reduced with speech improvement. Another main theme in AOS treatment is the use of repetition in order to achieve a large number of target utterances, or desired speech usages.

There are various treatment techniques for AOS. One technique, called the Linguistic Approach, utilizes the rules for sounds and sequences. This approach focuses on the placement of the mouth in forming speech sounds. Another type of treatment is the Motor-Programming Approach, in which the motor movements necessary for speech are practiced. This technique utilizes a great amount of repetition in order to practice the sequences and transitions that are necessary in between production of sounds.

Research about the treatment of apraxia has revealed four main categories: articulatory-kinematic, rate/rhythm control, intersystemic facilitation/reorganization treatments, and alternative/augmentative communication.

- Articulatory-kinematic treatments almost always require verbal production in order to bring about improvement of speech. One common technique for this is modeling or repetition in order to establish the desired speech behavior. Articulatory-kinematic treatments are based on the importance of patients to improve spatial and temporal aspects of speech production.
- Rate and rhythm control treatments exist to improve errors in patients' timing of speech, a common characteristic of Apraxia. These techniques often include an external source of control like metronomic pacing, for example, in repeated speech productions.
- Intersystemic reorganization/facilitation techniques often involve physical body or limb gestural approaches to improve speech. Gestures are usually combined with verbalization. It is thought that limb gestures may improve the organization of speech production.
- Finally, alternative and augmentative communication approaches to treatment of apraxia are highly individualized for each patient. However, they often involve a "comprehensive communication system" that may include "speech, a communication book aid, a spelling system, a drawing system, a gestural system, technologies, and informed speech partners".

One specific treatment method is referred to as PROMPT. This acronym stands for Prompts for Restructuring Oral Muscular Phonetic Targets, and takes a hands on multidimensional approach at treating speech production disorders. PROMPT therapists integrate physical-sensory, cognitive-linguistic, and social-emotional aspects of motor performance. The main focus is developing language interaction through this tactile-kinetic approach by using touch cues to facilitate the articulatory movements associated with individual phonemes, and eventually words.

One study describes the use of electropalatography (EPG) to treat a patient with severe acquired apraxia of speech. EPG is a computer-based tool for assessment and treatment of speech motor issues. The program allows patients to see the placement of articulators during speech production thus aiding them in attempting to correct errors. Originally after two years of speech therapy, the patient exhibited speech motor and production problems including problems with phonation, articulation, and resonance. This study showed that EPG therapy gave the patient valuable visual feedback to clarify speech movements that had been difficult for the patient to complete when given only auditory feedback.

While many studies are still exploring the various treatment methods, a few suggestions from ASHA for treating apraxia patients include the integration of objective treatment evidence, theoretical rationale, clinical knowledge and experience, and the needs and goals of the patient.

== History and terminology ==
The term apraxia was first defined by Hugo Karl Liepmann in 1908 as the "inability to perform voluntary acts despite preserved muscle strength." In 1969, Frederic L. Darley coined the term "apraxia of speech", replacing Liepmann's original term "apraxia of the glosso-labio-pharyngeal structures." Paul Broca had also identified this speech disorder in 1861, which he referred to as "aphemia": a disorder involving difficulty of articulation despite having intact language skills and muscular function.

The disorder is currently referred to as "apraxia of speech", but was also formerly termed "verbal dyspraxia". The term apraxia comes from the Greek root "praxis," meaning the performance of action or skilled movement. Adding the prefix "a", meaning absence, or "dys", meaning abnormal or difficult, to the root "praxis", both function to imply speech difficulties related to movement.

== See also ==
- Apraxia
- Aphasia
- Conduction aphasia
- Developmental coordination disorder
- Developmental verbal dyspraxia
- Dysarthria
- FOXP2
- KE family
- Origin of speech
- Speech and language impairment
