= Fis phenomenon =

Phenomenon in linguistics

The fis phenomenon is a phenomenon during a child's language acquisition that demonstrates that perception of phonemes occurs earlier than a child's ability to produce the appropriate allophone. It is also illustrative of a larger theme in child language acquisition: that skills in linguistic comprehension generally precede corresponding skills in linguistic production. The name comes from an incident reported in 1960 by J. Berko and R. Brown, in which a child referred to his inflatable plastic fish as a fis. However, when adults asked him, "Is this your fis?" he rejected the statement. When he was asked, "Is this your fish?" he responded, "Yes, my fis." This shows that although the child could not produce the phoneme /ʃ/, he could perceive it as being different from the phoneme /s/. In some cases, the sounds produced by the child are actually acoustically different, but not significantly enough for others to distinguish since the language in question does not make such contrasts.

== Occurrences in ASL ==
Researchers saw the Fis Phenomenon occur while doing research on Juli, a toddler who speaks ASL. The observers had seen it occur with her use of the word for 'water' when Juli was outside holding rocks in her hand and speaking to the observer through a window. Juli produced the sign [ix-rock water ix-loc(hose)] with the "20" handshape error for "water". The observer saw what Juli had signed, thinking that Juli wanted to eat the rocks in her hand and commented to Juli that she could not eat the rocks. As soon as Juli saw that the observer had interpreted her signing attempt of 'water' being the sign for 'food/eat' she corrected herself and repeated her sign with the 'W' handshape which signaled 'water'. The adult then realized what Juli meant and asked if what she meant was that she wanted to use the water hose and Juli nodded.

== Language acquisition ==
All languages can be deconstructed into smaller elements, they are considered levels of languages that are divided into: The Phonological System, the Reference System, the Morphological System, and the Syntactic System. The Phonological System correlates to the different stages that a child acquires language. The acquisition process begins at birth, the brain begins to specialize in the sounds heard around them and begin to produce vowel-like sounds. This is the cooing stage. The babbling stage, six to 11 months, is when consonants like /m/ and /b/ are combined with vowels, ma-ma-ma ba-ba-ba. The next two stages are the one word stage, 12 to 18 months, and two word stage, 18 months to two years of age. At around two years, the child enters the telegraphic stage, where they learn to put multiple words together. Note that researchers can only estimate the ages in which a child transitions through the stages. This is due to many varying factors when the child is acquiring language, like mental capability, the right language environment, exposure to language, and more.

The Phonological System is broken up into two different categories, perception and production. As the child goes through the stage of acquiring the language, perception and production is being developed in the brain. The Fis Phenomenon occurs due to lack of production ability by the kid, though the child perceives the sound to be correct. The relation between perception, production and the Fis Phenomenon is discussed below.

=== Perception ===
The phonological performance of children is predominantly consistent and predictable, leading to the generally accepted notion that their performance is governed by a set of rules, and it is not a result of random deviations. These rules are used to navigate from the surface form (adult pronunciation) to child pronunciation. This idea might help explain the occurrence of things such as the Fis Phenomenon.

There is evidence to support the idea that a child manipulates isomorphic adult representations of language. This evidence stems from three areas: 1) that a child has the ability to recognize disparities in the adult form that the child is unable to produce 2) that the child understands their own speech and 3) their grammatical and morphological tendencies.

The role of perception in the phonological performance of children is that their lexical representation of the adult form is first passed through the child's perceptual filter. Meaning that the adult pronunciation, or surface form, is not necessarily the form that is being affected by the child's phonological rules. There is a clear difference between the adult form and the child's mental representation. Barton (1976) tested this hypothesis and the results largely supported it, though there were later requests for a “perceptual explanation”.

The most notable example, shown below, illustrates the perception of consonant clusters compared to the child's output. Clusters consisting of [+nasal] followed by a [+voice] or [-voice] consonant are perceived differently by children.

mend → mɛn meant → mɛt

The nasal before a voiced consonant is long and notable (mend).

The nasal before an unvoiced consonant is indistinct, leaving the following consonant as the most notable of the cluster.

The child's mental representation is then converted by a small set of rules called Realization Rules, which are used to reach the final form, the child's pronunciation. An example of the implementation of Realization Rules is informally illustrated in the sample derivation below, where a child consistently produced squat as [gɔp]:

/skwɒt/ → [skwɔp] (harmonizing a coronal to a preceding labialized sequence /kw/)

[skwɔp] → [kwɔp] (deleting pre-consonantal /s/)

[kwɔp] → [kɔp] (deleting post-consonantal sonorants)

[kɔp] → [gɔp] (neutralizing the voicing distinction)

=== Production ===
Although children seem to be able to recognize the correct pronunciation of “fish”, they can only produce an /s/, meaning that they are left saying “fis” instead. Since the problem doesn't seem to be speech perception, experts believe that the problem is associated with mostly the coordination of speech muscles, leaving them to think that these children's speech muscles need practice. One way that experts encourage the practice of speech production in children are by word/phrase repetition. In this case, it'll be helpful to practice words that contain the /ʃ/ sound in “fish”.

== Experiments and studies ==
=== Covert contrast as a stage in the acquisition of phonetics and phonology ===
Scoobie et al. in 1996 looked into the notion of child perception and how they acquire their speech as well as how children contrast minimal pairs. Used Children with phonological disorders and focused on /s/ initial-stop clusters for their acquisition of them.

=== Invariant order of phonological development ===
A 1941 study by Roman Jakobson hypothesized that children who speak English follow a basic phonological order when acquiring their language's feature distinctions and, more strongly, that some elements of this order are sequential with respect to others, i.e., that for some distinctions, a child cannot fully acquire that distinction unless the child has already learned one or more some specific other distinctions. In a 1948 study, Schvachkin hypothesized that Russian-speaking children develop phonetic distinctions in an invariant order. A table is then shown where the “hushing” vs “hissing” sibilants were second to last on the order of acquisition. Given that children are still refining and working on their phonetic production skills, it might be the case that these features are not produced accurately because previous ones still need work.

=== Juliette Blevins and claims ===
Juliette Blevins claimed that children can perceive both their own use of the language minimal pairs along with the adult usages. Though the child may believe that the subtle differences in their use of the minimal pair can be perceived by the adult, because the child themselves can recognize the differences.

== See also ==
- Language acquisition
- Phonological development
- Speech disorder
- Speech–language pathology
- Wug test
