= Lisp =

- Other names: Sigmatism
- Specialty: Speech–language pathology, pediatrics

A lisp is a speech impairment in which a person misarticulates sibilants ([s], [z], [ts], [dz], [ʃ], [ʒ], [t͡ʃ], [d͡ʒ]). These misarticulations often result in unclear speech in languages with phonemic sibilants.

== Types ==
- A frontal lisp occurs when the tongue is placed anterior to the target. Interdental lisping is produced when the tip of the tongue protrudes between the front teeth and dentalized lisping is produced when the tip of the tongue just touches the front teeth. The transcription in the International Phonetic Alphabet for interdental sibilants is [s̪͆] and [z̪͆] and for simple dental sibilants is [s̪] and [z̪]. When a fronted lisp does not have a sibilant quality, due to lack of a grooved articulation, the IPA transcription would be [θ, ð] or variants thereof.
- A lateral lisp occurs when the [s] and [z] sounds are produced with air-flow over the sides of the tongue. It is also called "slushy ess" or a "slushy lisp" in part due to its wet, spitty sound. The symbols for these lateralised sounds in the extensions to the International Phonetic Alphabet for disordered speech are [ʪ] and [ʫ].
- A nasal lisp occurs when part or the entire air stream is directed through the nasal cavity. The transcription for sibilants with nasal frication in the extensions to the IPA is [s̾] and [z̾]; simple nasal fricatives are [s̃] and [z̃].
- A strident lisp results in a high-frequency whistle or hissing sound caused by stream passing between the tongue and the hard surface. In the extensions to the IPA, whistled sibilants are transcribed [s͎] and [z͎].
- A palatal lisp is where the speaker attempts to make a sibilant while the middle of the tongue is in contact with the soft palate, or with a posterior articulation of the sibilant. The latter may be transcribed [s̠] and [z̠], [ʃ] and [ʒ], or the like.

== Causes ==
Successful treatments have shown that causes are functional rather than physical: that is, most lisps are caused by errors in tongue placement or density of the tongue within the mouth rather than caused by any injury or congenital or acquired deformity to the mouth. The most frequently discussed of these problems is tongue thrust in which the tongue protrudes beyond the front teeth. This protrusion affects speech as well as swallowing and can lead to lisping. Ankyloglossia or tongue tie can also be responsible for lisps in children — however, it is unclear whether these deficiencies are caused by the tongue tie itself or the muscle weakness following the correction of the tongue tie. Overbites and underbites may also contribute to non lingual lisping. Temporary lisps can be caused by dental work, excess saliva, mouthguards, dental appliances such as dentures, dental braces, or retainers or by swollen or bruised tongues.

== Treatment ==
=== Frenectomy ===
Lisps caused by tongue tie can be treated by a dentist or otolaryngologist (ENT) with a lingual frenectomy, or laser incision, which takes less than 10 to 15 minutes to complete.

=== Speech therapy ===
With an interdental lisp, the therapist teaches the student how to keep the tongue behind the two front incisors.

One popular method of correcting articulation or lisp disorders is to isolate sounds and work on correcting the sound in isolation. The basic sound, or phoneme, is selected as a target for treatment. Typically the position of the sound within a word is considered and targeted. The sound appears in the beginning of the word, middle, or end of the word (initial, medial, or final).

Take for example, correction of an "S" sound (lisp). Most likely, a speech language pathologist (SLP) would employ exercises to work on the sibilant [s]. Starting practice words would most likely consist of "S-initial" words such as "say, sun, soap, sip, sick, said, sail." According to this protocol, the SLP slowly increases the complexity of tasks (context of pronunciations) as the production of the sound improves. Examples of increased complexity could include saying words in phrases and sentences, saying longer multi syllabic words, or increasing the tempo of pronunciation.

Using this method, the SLP achieves success with their student by targeting a sound in a phonetically consistent manner. Phonetic consistency means that a target sound is isolated at the smallest possible level (phoneme, phone, or allophone) and that the context of production must be consistent. Consistency is critical, because factors such as the position within the word, grouping with other sounds (vowels or consonants), and the complexity all may affect production.

Another popular method for treating a lisp is using specially designed devices that go in the mouth to provide a tactile cue of exactly where the tongue should be positioned when saying the "S" sound. This tactile feedback has been shown to correct lisp errors twice as fast as traditional therapy.

Using either or both methods, the repetition of consistent contexts allows the student to align all the necessary processes required to properly produce language; language skills (ability to formulate correct sounds in the brain: What sounds do I need to make?), motor planning (voicing and jaw and tongue movements: How do I produce the sound?), and auditory processing (receptive feedback: Was the sound produced correctly? Do I need to correct?).

A student with an articulation or lisp disorder has a deficiency in one or more of these areas. To correct the deficiency, adjustments have to be made in one or more of these processes. The process to correct it is more often than not, trial and error. With so many factors, however, isolating the variables (the sound) is imperative to getting to the result faster.

A phonetically consistent treatment strategy means practicing the same thing over and over. What is practiced is consistent and does not change. The words might change, but the phoneme and its positioning is the same (say, sip, sill, soap, ...). Thus, successful correction of the disorder is found in manipulating or changing the other factors involved with speech production (tongue positioning, cerebral processing, etc.). Once a successful result (speech) is achieved, then consistent practice becomes essential to reinforcing correct productions.

When the difficult sound is mastered, the student will then learn to say the sound in syllables, then words, then phrases and then sentences. When a student can speak a whole sentence without lisping, attention is then focused on making correct sounds throughout natural conversation. Towards the end of the course of therapy, the student will be taught how to monitor their own speech, and how to correct as necessary. Speech therapy can sometimes fix the problem, but in some cases speech therapy fails to work.

== See also ==
- Rhotacism (speech impediment), 'lisp' on the letter R
- Gay male speech
- Speech sound disorder
