= Infantilism (physiological disorder) =

Physiological trouble

In medicine, infantilism is an obsolete term for various, often unrelated disorders of human development, up to developmental disability, which consist of retention of the physical and/or psychological characteristics of early developmental stages (infant, toddler, child, adolescent) into a relatively advanced age.

Various types of infantilism were recognized, lumped together in the above superficial description. With better understanding of the endocrine system and genetic disorders, various disorders which included the word "infantilism" received other names. For example, Brissaud's infantilism, described by Édouard Brissaud in 1907, is now known as myxedema (a form of hypothyroidism); "intestinal infantilism" of Christian Archibald Herter is called coeliac disease. The Turner syndrome was described as "a syndrome of infantilism" by Henry Turner himself.

Terms such as "genital infantilism" (infantilism in development of genitals, hypogenitalism), or "sexual infantilism" (lack of sexual development after expected puberty or delayed puberty) may still be seen, and are considered to be synonyms of hypogonadism. "Somatic infantilism" refers to infantilism of overall bodily development. Speech infantilism is a speech disorder.

Similarly to some other medical terms (cretinism, idiotism), "infantilism"/"infantile" may be used pejoratively (synonymous to "immature").

== See also ==
- Infantilization
- Peter Pan syndrome
- Age regression in hypnotherapy
