= Motor speech disorders =

Speech disorders involving difficulty articulating phonemes

Motor speech disorders are a class of speech disorders that disturb the body's natural ability to speak due to neurologic impairments. Altogether, motor speech disorders are a group of speech output dysfunctions due to neurological complications. These neurologic impairments make it difficult for individuals with motor speech disorders to plan, program, control, coordinate, and execute speech productions. Disturbances to the individual's natural ability to speak vary in their etiology based on the integrity and integration of cognitive, neuromuscular, and musculoskeletal activities. Speaking is an act dependent on thought and timed execution of airflow and oral motor / oral placement of the lips, tongue, and jaw that can be disrupted by weakness in oral musculature (dysarthria) or an inability to execute the motor movements needed for specific speech sound production (apraxia of speech or developmental verbal dyspraxia). Such deficits can be related to pathology of the nervous system (central and /or peripheral systems involved in motor planning) that affect the timing of respiration, phonation, prosody, and articulation in isolation or in conjunction.

== Causes ==
The overarching cause of motor speech disorders is due to neurological dysfunction. Lesions in a cranial nerve might be a factor. Stroke, head injuries, neoplasms, degenerative disorders, are examples of what might drive the onset of one of the motor speech disorders. Malfunctioning of neural transmission to the muscles leads to the inability to use certain vocal or facial muscles appropriately.

== Treatments ==
Speech-language therapy has been shown to assist patients with motor speech disorders, even in severe cases such as years after a brain injury. Various goals are employed when treating a patient with speech therapy: restoration, compensation, and adjustment. To restore, the speech therapy will aim to reduce the impairment itself and its effects. In some cases, compensation is required, which may include the use of prosthetics. Adjustment might require lifestyle changes to help the patient manage their reduced ability to communicate.

Early intervention is associated with higher success rates of treatment for patients, Speech-language therapists treat patients following a hierarchical model, gradually becoming more specific. Delays in successful treatment may occur if the patient does not practice as instructed. For stroke patients, teams of healthcare professionals often work together, while in other cases such as Parkinson's, the use of pharmaceuticals might be necessary.

Sometimes goals need to be met via a multidisciplinary approach. The length of time for treatment relies on the severity of the disorder. There are many factors that are involved in treatment. Other facets of this multidimensional approach may include prosthetics, behavioral management, and more. Voice amplifiers might be required for some. Behavioral approaches aim to assist the person with communicating within their surrounding environment. Speaker oriented approaches and communication oriented approaches are two ways in which this can be achieved. For instance, controlling posture and the mobility of articulators might be part of a typical treatment plan in which behavioral management is employed. Assessment might include tools such as the Dysarthria Impact Profile. Apraxia is most properly diagnosed when the patient is asked to demonstrate certain tool related tasks or communication related gestures. The scales available today likely need more research and development as many are considered to be mostly invalid.

Group therapy is another treatment method that can be utilized for dysarthria. The benefits can potentially span from improved communication abilities to overall well-being. Singing has been studied and might require further research, though has been noted to help some, as well as loudness based group therapies.

== Dysarthria ==
Dysarthria is the reduced ability to motor plan volitional movements needed for speech production as the result of weakness/paresis and/or paralysis of the musculature of the oral mechanism needed for respiration, phonation, resonance, articulation, and/or prosody.

Dysarthria refers to the speech disorders in which neuromotor pathologies are at play. The symptoms of speech are described are being constant, predictable disturbances of articulation, sound production, speech breathing, changes in voice quality, pitch, and more. Muscle weakness and the inability to coordinate the movements that enable a person to speak are the key characteristics of these disorders. Dysarthria is due to sensorimotor impairments. The muscles, lower motor neuron, or areas concerning the sensorimotor cortex might be damaged.

== Apraxia ==
There are two types of apraxia. Developmental (or childhood apraxia of speech) or acquired Apraxia. Childhood apraxia of speech is a neurological childhood speech sound disorder that involves impaired precision and consistency of movements required for speech production without any neuromuscular deficits (ASHA, 2007a, Definitions of CAS section, para. 1). Both are the inability to plan volitional motor movements for speech production in the absence of muscular weakness. Apraxia is not a result of sensory problems, or physical issues with the articulatory structures themselves, simply the way the brain plans to move them.

Apraxia refers to a motor speech disorder in which the person demonstrates slow speech, irregularities in sound, numerous pauses. The major causes of apraxia is neurological dysfunction, due to damage via neurodegenerative illnesses or stroke particularly in the left hemisphere. Problems with the left middle cerebral artery in particular is associated with apraxia of speech. Brain lesion areas are likely to be located in the supplementary motor areas, sensorimotor cortex, insula, or others. Impairments include language forming or speech motor planning. Additionally, problems with the cerebellum or basal ganglia might be at play as well. Additionally however, those with apraxia might not be able to produce any speech at all, referred to as apraxic mutism.

There are two types of Apraxia. Developmental (or Childhood Apraxia of speech) or acquired Apraxia. Childhood apraxia of speech (CAS) is a neurological childhood speech sound disorder that involves impaired precision and consistency of movements required for speech production without any neuromuscular deficits. Developmental verbal dyspraxia refers to an impairment in coordinating the physical gestures required for speech as well as difficulty with expressive or receptive linguistics. Research has suggested links to the FOXP2 gene. Both are the inability to plan volitional motor movements for speech production in the absence of muscular weakness. Apraxia is not a result of sensory problems, or physical issues with the articulatory structures themselves, simply the way the brain plans to move them.

However, apraxia can also be put into specific categories: ideomotor, ideational, and limb-kinetic. Ideomotor apraxia describes disorders in which the person can describe how to use a tool, but cannot physically conduct the task using the tool. Ideational apraxia refers to struggles that are more conceptual, such as not being able to conceptualize a task, although they are able to name the objects in front of them. Limb-kinetic apraxia is more physical in nature, in which the person cannot certain gestures that involve fine motor skills or dexterity of the fingers or hands.

== See also ==
- KE family
