= Speech sound disorder =

- Other names: Phoneme-muteness, partial muteness
- Specialty: Speech–language pathology, phoniatrics

A speech sound disorder (SSD) is a speech disorder affecting the ability to pronounce speech sounds, which includes speech articulation disorders and phonemic disorders, the latter referring to some sounds (phonemes) not being produced or used correctly. The term "protracted phonological development" is sometimes preferred when describing children's speech, to emphasize the continuing development while acknowledging the delay.

A study in the United States estimated that among 6-year-olds, 5.3% of African-American children and 3.8% of white children have a speech sound disorder.

== Classification ==
Speech sound disorders may be further subdivided into two primary types, articulation disorders (also called phonetic production disorders) and phonemic disorders (also called phonological disorders). However, some may have a mixed disorder in which both articulation and phonological problems exist. Though speech sound disorders are associated with childhood, some residual errors may persist into adulthood. Several different sources suggest that 1 to 2% of the young adult population overall continue to present with speech sound disorder errors.

=== Articulation disorders ===
Articulation disorders (also called phonetic production disorders, or simply "artic disorders" for short) are based on difficulty learning to physically produce the intended phonemes. Articulation disorders have to do with the main articulators which are the lips, teeth, alveolar ridge, hard palate, velum, glottis, and the tongue. If the disorder has anything to do with any of these articulators, then it is an articulation disorder. There are usually fewer errors than with a phonemic disorder, and distortions are more likely (though any omissions, additions, and substitutions may also be present). They are often treated by teaching the child how to physically produce the sound and having them practice its production until it (hopefully) becomes natural. Articulation disorders should not be confused with motor speech disorders, such as dysarthria (in which there is actual paralysis of the speech musculature) or developmental verbal dyspraxia (in which motor planning is severely impaired).

==== Types ====
- Deltacism (from the Greek letter delta) is a difficulty in producing /d/.
- Etacism (from the Greek letter eta) is a difficulty in producing sounds associated with the letter ⟨e⟩.
- Gammacism (from the Greek letter gamma) is a difficulty in producing /ɡ/.
- Hitism is a difficulty in producing /h/.
- Iotacism (from the Greek letter iota) is a difficulty in producing /j/.
- Kapacism (from the Greek letter kappa) is a difficulty in producing /k/.
- Lambdacism (from the Greek letter lambda) is a difficulty in producing lateral consonants.
- Rhotacism (from the Greek letter rho) is a difficulty in producing rhotic consonants in the respective language's standard pronunciation.
  - In Czech there is a specific type of rhotacism called rhotacismus bohemicus, which is an inability to pronounce the specific sound ⟨ř⟩ /r̝/.
- Sigmatism (from the Greek letter sigma) is a difficulty in producing /s/, /z/ and similar sounds (sibilants).
- Tetacism is a difficulty in producing /t/.
- Tetism is replacement of /s/, /k/ and similar sounds with /t/ and of /z/ and similar sounds with /d/.

=== Phonemic disorders ===
In a phonemic disorder (also called a phonological disorder) the child has trouble learning the sound system of the language, failing to recognize which sound-contrasts also contrast meaning. For example, the sounds /k/ and /t/ may not be recognized as having different meanings, so "call" and "tall" might be treated as homophones, both being pronounced as "tall." This is called phoneme collapse, and in some cases many sounds may all be represented by one — e.g., /d/ might replace /t/, /k/, and /ɡ/. As a result, the number of error sounds is often (though not always) greater than with articulation disorders and substitutions are usually the most common error. Phonemic disorders are often treated using minimal pairs (two words that differ by only one sound) to draw the child's attention to the difference and its effect on communication.

Some children with phonemic disorders can hear that two phonemes are different from each other when others speak, but are not aware that those phonemes sound the same when they themselves speak. This is called the fis phenomenon, after a scenario in which a speech pathologist says, "You said 'fis,' did you mean 'fish'?" And the child responds, "No, I didn't say 'fis,' I said 'fis'." In some cases, a child is making sounds, that, while similar, are acoustically distinct. Others don’t hear that difference, however, because the two sounds are not treated as separate phonemes in the language being spoken.

Though phonemic disorders are often considered language disorders in that it is the language system that is affected, they are also speech sound disorders in that the errors relate to the use of phonemes. This makes them different from specific language impairment, which is primarily a disorder of the syntax (grammar) and usage of language rather than the sound system. However, the two can coexist, affecting the same person.

Other disorders can deal with a variety of different ways to pronounce consonants. Some examples are glides and liquids. Glides occur when the articulatory posture changes gradually from consonant to vowel. Liquids can include /l/ and /ɹ/.

=== Mixed speech sound disorders ===
In some cases phonetic and phonemic errors may coexist in the same person. In such case the primary focus is usually on the phonological component but articulation therapy may be needed as part of the process, since teaching a child how to use a sound is not practical if the child does not know how to produce it.

=== Residual errors ===
Even though most speech sound disorders can be successfully treated in childhood, and a few may even outgrow them on their own, errors may sometimes persist into adulthood rather than only being not age appropriate. Such persisting errors are referred to as "residual errors" and may remain for life.

== Presentation ==
Errors produced by children with speech sound disorders are typically classified into four categories:

- Omissions: Certain sounds are not produced — entire syllables or classes of sounds may be deleted; e.g., fi' for fish or 'at for cat. This differs from features like non-rhoticity, h-dropping or l-vocalization which are part of various regional, national, and ethnic accents and are generally not considered disorders.
- Additions (or Epentheses/Commissions): an extra sound or sounds are added to the intended word; e.g. puh-lane for plane.
- Distortions: Sounds are changed slightly so that the intended sound may be recognized but sounds "wrong," or may not sound like any sound in the language.
- Substitutions: One or more sounds are substituted for another; e.g., wabbit for rabbit or tow for cow.

Sometimes, even for experts, telling exactly which type has been made is not obvious — some distorted forms of /ɹ/ may be mistaken for /w/ by a casual observer, yet may not actually be either sound but somewhere in between. Further, children with severe speech sound disorders may be difficult to understand, making it hard to tell what word was actually intended and thus what is actually wrong with it. Some terms can be used to describe more than one of the above categories, such as lisp, which is often the replacement of /s/ with /θ/ (a substitution), but can be a distortion, producing /s/ just behind the teeth resulting in a sound somewhere between /s/ and /θ/.

There are three different levels of classification when determining the magnitude and type of an error that is produced:

1. Sounds the patient can produce
  1. A: Phonemic- can be produced easily; used meaningfully and contrastively
  2. B: Phonetic- produced only upon request; not used consistently, meaningfully, or contrastively; not used in connected speech
2. Stimulable sounds
  1. A: Easily stimulable
  2. B: Stimulable after demonstration and probing (i.e. with a tongue depressor)
3. Cannot produce the sound
  1. A: Cannot be produced voluntarily
  2. B: No production ever observed

Note that omissions do not mean the sound cannot be produced, and some sounds may be produced more easily or frequently when appearing with certain other sounds: someone might be able to say "s" and "t" separately, but not "st," or may be able to produce a sound at the beginning of a word but not at the end. The magnitude of the problem will often vary between different sounds from the same speaker.

== Causes ==
Speech sound disorders (SSDs) can arise from a variety of causes, which are generally categorized into organic and functional factors:

Organic causes

These include physical or neurological issues that affect speech production:

- hearing loss, including temporary hearing loss, such as from ear infections
- developmental disorders (e.g. autism)
- neurological disorders (e.g. cerebral palsy)
- cleft palate or other physical anomalies of the mouth

Functional causes

These are cases where there is no identifiable physical cause:

- disorders: problems in understanding and using the sound system of a language, such as substituting one sound for another.
- disorder where by a child has difficulty in physically producing specific speech sounds.
- motor issues with problems with coordination or strength of the muscles involved in speech, even when no neurological or structural issue is identified.

Other influences

- genetic disorders (e.g. Down syndrome)
- illness
- environmental factors such as education (e.g. parents or teachers with similar disorders), limited exposure to language or specific speech models, or lack of opportunities for practice

Identifying the underlying cause is key to determining the appropriate intervention.

== Diagnosis ==
According to a cross-linguistic study across 27 languages, children acquire most consonants by 5. On average, all plosives, nasals, and glides were acquired by 3 years and 11 months; all affricates were acquired by 4 years and 11 months; all liquids were acquired by 5 years and 11 months; and all fricatives were acquired by 6 years and 11 months (90% criterion). When a child continues to have issues with articulation beyond typical age, it is recommended to see a speech-language pathologist. Misarticulation of certain difficult sounds ([l], [ɹ], [s], [z], [θ], [ð], [t͡ʃ], [d͡ʒ], and [ʒ]) may be normal up to 8 years.

Diagnosing a speech sound disorder involves a structured process that includes the following steps:

1. Case history: The speech-language pathologist (SLP) will gather information about the child's developmental milestones, medical history, family background, and any other relevant factors, like hearing or ear infections.
2. Hearing screening: Since hearing is crucial for speech development, a hearing test is usually performed to rule out hearing loss as a cause.
3. Speech assessment: The SLP evaluates how well the child can produce specific sounds by asking them to say certain words, phrases, or sentences. This often includes articulation tests (to see if the child has trouble physically producing certain sounds) and phonological process tests (to check for patterns of sound errors (like substituting one sound for another)).
4. Oral-motor exam: An exam of the mouth and muscles involved in speech (e.g., lips, tongue, jaw) helps determine if there are any structural or motor problems causing the disorder.
5. Cause identification: Based on the results, the SLP determines the likely cause of the speech sound disorder.

This comprehensive assessment allows the SLP to develop an individualized treatment plan tailored to the child’s specific needs.

== Treatment ==
For most children, the disorder is not lifelong and speech difficulties improve with time and speech–language treatment. Prognosis is poorer for children who also have a language disorder, as that may be indicative of a learning disorder.

There are several treatments available which depends on the cause of speech sound disorders:

- a highly unintelligible child which neurological issues might need core vocabulary therapy
- a child with difficulties across categories of phonological processes might be indicated for contrastive therapy
- a child with a repaired cleft palate and velopharyngeal insufficiency may require articulation therapy
- a child diagnosed with childhood apraxia of speech might need PROMPT or REsT therapy

A certified speech–language pathologist should make a full assessment and diagnosis to indicate appropriate therapy. When a speech-language pathologist trains parents to implement language and communication intervention techniques this can improved outcome for children.

== See also ==
- Accent (sociolinguistics)
- Developmental verbal dyspraxia
- FOXP2
- KE family
- Infantile speech
- Speech and language pathology
- Whistled sibilant s, associated with some speech disorders, though found naturally in languages such as Shona
