= Developmental verbal dyspraxia =

Difficulty in coordinating muscles needed for speech

- Other names: Speech and language disorder with orofacial dyspraxia
- Specialty: Speech–language pathology
- Frequency: 0.0001%

Developmental verbal dyspraxia (DVD), also known as childhood apraxia of speech (CAS) and developmental apraxia of speech (DAS), is a motor speech disorder in which an individual has problems saying sounds, syllables and words. This is not because of muscle weakness or paralysis. The brain has problems planning to move the body parts (e.g., lips, jaw, tongue) needed for speech. The individual knows what they want to say, but their brain has difficulty coordinating the muscle movements necessary to say those words.

The exact cause of this disorder is usually unknown. Many observations suggest a genetic cause of DVD, as many with the disorder have a family history of communication disorders. The gene FOXP2 has been implicated in many studies of the condition, and when this is the cause, the condition is inherited in an autosomal dominant manner, however, roughly 75% of these cases are de novo.

There is no cure for DVD, but with appropriate, intensive intervention, people with the condition can improve significantly.

== Presentation ==
"Childhood apraxia of speech (CAS) is a neurological childhood (pediatric) speech sound disorder in which the precision and consistency of movements underlying speech are impaired in the absence of neuromuscular deficits (e.g., abnormal reflexes, abnormal tone). CAS may occur as a result of known neurological impairment, in association with complex neurobehavioral disorders of known or unknown origin, or as an idiopathic neurogenic speech sound disorder. The core impairment in planning and/or programming spatiotemporal parameters of movement sequences results in errors in speech sound production and prosody." American Speech-Language-Hearing Association (ASHA) Ad Hoc Committee on Apraxia of Speech in Children (2007)

There are three significant features that differentiate DVD/CAS from other childhood speech sound disorders. These features are:

- "Inconsistent errors on consonants and vowels in repeated productions of syllables and words
- Lengthened coarticulatory transitions between sounds and syllables
- Inappropriate prosody, especially in the realization of lexical or phrasal stress"

Even though DVD/CAS is a developmental disorder, it will not simply disappear when children grow older. Children with this disorder do not follow typical patterns of language acquisition and will need treatment in order to make progress.

== Causes ==
DVD/CAS is a motor disorder, which means that the problem is located in the brain and its signals, and not in the mouth. In most cases, the cause is unknown. Possible causes include genetic syndromes and disorders.

Recent research has focused on the significance of the FOXP2 gene in both species and individual development. Research regarding the KE family, where half the members of the extended family, over three generations, exhibited heritable developmental verbal dyspraxia, were found to have a defective copy of the FOXP2 gene. and further studies suggest that the FOXP2 gene as well as other genetic issues could explain DVD/CAS. including 16p11.2 microdeletion syndrome.

New research suggests a role for the sodium channel SCN3A in the development of the perisylvian areas, which maintain key language circuits- Broca and Wernicke Area. Patients with mutations in SCN3A had oral-motor speech disorders.

Birth/prenatal injuries, as well as stroke, can also be causes of DVD/CAS. Furthermore, DVD/CAS can occur as a secondary characteristic to a variety of other conditions. These include autism, some forms of epilepsy, fragile X syndrome, galactosemia and chromosome translocations involving duplications or deletions.

== Diagnosis ==
Developmental verbal dyspraxia can be diagnosed by a speech–language pathologist (SLP) through specific exams that measure oral mechanisms of speech. The oral mechanisms exam involves tasks such as pursing lips, blowing, licking lips, elevating the tongue, and also involves an examination of the mouth. A complete exam also involves observation of the patient eating and talking. Tests such as the Kaufman Speech Praxis test, a more formal examination, are also used in diagnosis. A differential diagnosis of DVD/CAS is often not possible for children under the age of two years old. Even when children are between 2–3 years, a clear diagnosis cannot always occur, because at this age, they may still be unable to focus on, or cooperate with, diagnostic testing.

== Management ==
There is no cure for DVD/CAS, but with appropriate, intensive intervention, people with the disorder can improve significantly.

DVD/CAS requires various forms of therapy which varies with the individual needs of the patient. Typically, treatment involves one-on-one therapy with a speech–language pathologist (SLP). In children with DVD/CAS, consistency is a key element in treatment. Consistency in the form of communication, as well as the development and use of oral communication are extremely important in aiding a child's speech learning process.

Many therapy approaches are not supported by thorough evidence; however, the aspects of treatment that do seem to be agreed upon are the following:

- Treatment needs to be intense and highly individualized, with about 3–5 therapy sessions each week
- A maximum of 30 minutes per session is best for young children
- Principles of motor learning theory and intense speech-motor practice seem to be the most effective
- Non-speech oral motor therapy is not necessary or sufficient
- A multi-sensory approach to therapy may be beneficial: using sign language, pictures, tactile cues, visual prompts, and augmentative and alternative communication (AAC) can be helpful.

Although these aspects of treatment are supported by much clinical documentation, they lack evidence from systematic research studies. In ASHA's position statement on DVD/CAS, ASHA states there is a critical need for collaborative, interdisciplinary, and programmatic research on the neural substrates, behavioral correlates, and treatment options for DVD/CAS.

=== Integral stimulation ===
One technique that is frequently used to treat DVD/CAS is integral stimulation. Integral stimulation is based on cognitive motor learning, focusing on the cognitive motor planning needed for the complex motor task of speech. It is often referred to as the "watch me, listen, do as I do" approach and is founded on a multi-step hierarchy of strategies for treatment. This hierarchy of strategies allows the clinician to alter treatment depending upon the needs of the child. It uses various modalities of presentation, emphasizing the auditory and visual modes. Experts suggest that extensive practice and experience with the new material is key, so hundreds of target stimuli should be elicited in a single session. Furthermore, distributed (shorter, but more frequent) and random treatment, which mix target and non-target utterances, produces greater overall learning.

The six steps of the hierarchy upon which integral stimulation therapy for children is loosely organized are:

- "The child watches and listens and simultaneously produces the stimulus with the clinician.
- The clinician models, then the child repeats the stimulus while the clinician simultaneously mouths it.
- The clinician models and provides cues and the child repeats.
- The clinician models and the child repeats with no cues provided.
- The clinician elicits the stimulus without modeling, such as by asking a question, with the child responding spontaneously.
- The child produces stimuli in less-directed situations with clinician encouragement, such as in role-play or games".

=== Integrated phonological approach ===
Another treatment strategy that has been shown to have positive effects is an integrated phonological approach. This approach "incorporates targeted speech production practice into phonological awareness activities and uses letters and phonological cues to prompt speech production". McNeill, Gillon, & Dodd studied 12 children ages 4–7 with DVD/CAS who were treated with this approach two times a week for two six-week blocks of time (separated by a six-week withdrawal block). They found positive effects for most of the children in the areas of speech production, phonological awareness, word decoding, letter knowledge, and spelling. These results show that it is clinically productive to target speech production, phonological awareness, letter knowledge, spelling, and reading all at once. This is particularly important since children with DVD/CAS often have continuous problems with reading and spelling, even if their production of speech improves.

== See also ==
- Apraxia
- Apraxia of speech
- Developmental coordination disorder
- Dysarthria
- FOXP2 and human evolution
- KE family
- Origin of speech
- Speech and language impairment
