= Speech disorder =

Communication disorder in which normal speech is disrupted

Speech disorders, impairments, or impediments are a type of communication disorder in which normal speech is disrupted. This can mean fluency disorders like stuttering and cluttering. Someone who is unable to speak due to a speech disorder is considered mute. Speech skills are vital to social relationships and learning, and delays or disorders in developing these skills can impact individuals' function. For many children and adolescents, this can present as issues with academics. Speech disorders affect roughly 11.5% of the US population, and 5% of the primary school population. Speech is a complex process that requires precise timing, nerve and muscle control, and as a result is susceptible to impairments. A person who has a stroke, an accident or birth defect may have speech and language problems.

Common speech disorders include articulation disorders, which involves difficulty producing specific sounds correctly; phonological disorders, which is the inability to use all of the speech sounds to form words; disfluency, such as stuttering, which disrupts the natural flow of words such as elongating words, repeating sounds etc.

== Classification ==
There are three different levels of classification when determining the magnitude and type of a speech disorder and the proper treatment or therapy:

1. Sounds the patient can produce
  1. Phonemic – can be produced easily; used meaningfully and constructively
  2. Phonetic – produced only upon request; not used consistently, meaningfully, or constructively; not used in connected speech
2. Stimulate sounds
  1. Easily stimulated
  2. Stimulate after demonstration and probing (i.e. with a tongue depressor)
3. Cannot produce the sound
  1. Cannot be produced voluntarily
  2. No production ever observed

=== Types of disorder ===
- Aphasia
- Apraxia of speech may result from stroke or progressive illness, and involves inconsistent production of speech sounds and rearranging of sounds in a word ("potato" may become "topato" and next "totapo"). Production of words becomes more difficult with effort, but common phrases may sometimes be spoken spontaneously without effort.
- Cluttering, a speech and fluency disorder characterized primarily by a rapid rate of speech, which makes speech difficult to understand.
- Developmental verbal dyspraxia also known as childhood apraxia of speech.
- Dysarthria is a weakness or paralysis of speech muscles caused by damage to the nerves or brain. Dysarthria is often caused by strokes, Parkinson's disease, ALS, head or neck injuries, surgical accident, or cerebral palsy.
- Dysprosody is an extremely rare neurological speech disorder. It is characterized by alterations in intensity, in the timing of utterance segments, and in rhythm, cadence, and intonation of words. The changes to the duration, the fundamental frequency, and the intensity of tonic and atonic syllables of the sentences spoken, deprive an individual's particular speech of its characteristics. The cause of dysprosody is usually associated with neurological pathologies such as brain vascular accidents, cranioencephalic traumatisms, and brain tumors.
- Lisps
- Muteness is the complete inability to speak.
- Speech sound disorders involve difficulty in producing specific speech sounds (most often certain consonants, such as /s/ or /r/), and are subdivided into articulation disorders (also called phonetic disorders) and phonemic disorders. Articulation disorders are characterized by difficulty learning to produce sounds physically. Phonemic disorders are characterized by difficulty in learning the sound distinctions of a language, so that one sound may be used in place of many. However, it is not uncommon for a single person to have a mixed speech sound disorder with both phonemic and phonetic components.
- Stuttering (AKA dysphemia) affects approximately 1% of the adult population.
- Voice disorders are impairments, often physical, that involve the function of the larynx or vocal resonance.

== Causes ==
In some cases the cause is unknown. However, there are various known causes of speech impairments, such as hearing loss, neurological disorders, brain injury, an increase in mental strain, constant bullying, intellectual disability, substance use disorder, physical impairments such as cleft lip and palate, and vocal abuse or misuse. After strokes, there is known to be a higher incidence of apraxia of speech, which is a disorder affecting neurological pathways involved with speech. Poor motor function is also suggested to be highly associated with speech disorders, especially in children. Hereditary causes have also been suggested, as many times children of individuals with speech disorders will develop them as well. 20–40% individuals with a family history of a specific language impairment are likely to be diagnosed, whereas only 4% of the population overall is likely to be diagnosed. There are also language disorders that are known to be genetic, such as hereditary ataxia, which can cause slow and unclear speech.

== Treatment ==
Many of these types of disorders can be treated by speech therapy, but others require medical attention by a doctor in phoniatrics. Other treatments include correction of organic conditions and psychotherapy.

In the United States, school-age children with a speech disorder are often placed in special education programs. Children who struggle to learn to talk often experience persistent communication difficulties in addition to academic struggles. More than 700,000 of the students served in the public schools' special education programs in the 2000–2001 school year were categorized as having a speech or language impairment. This estimate does not include children who have speech and language impairments secondary to other conditions such as deafness". Many school districts provide the students with speech therapy during school hours, although extended day and summer services may be appropriate under certain circumstances.

Patients will be treated in teams, depending on the type of disorder they have. A team can include speech–language pathologists, specialists, family doctors, teachers, and family members.

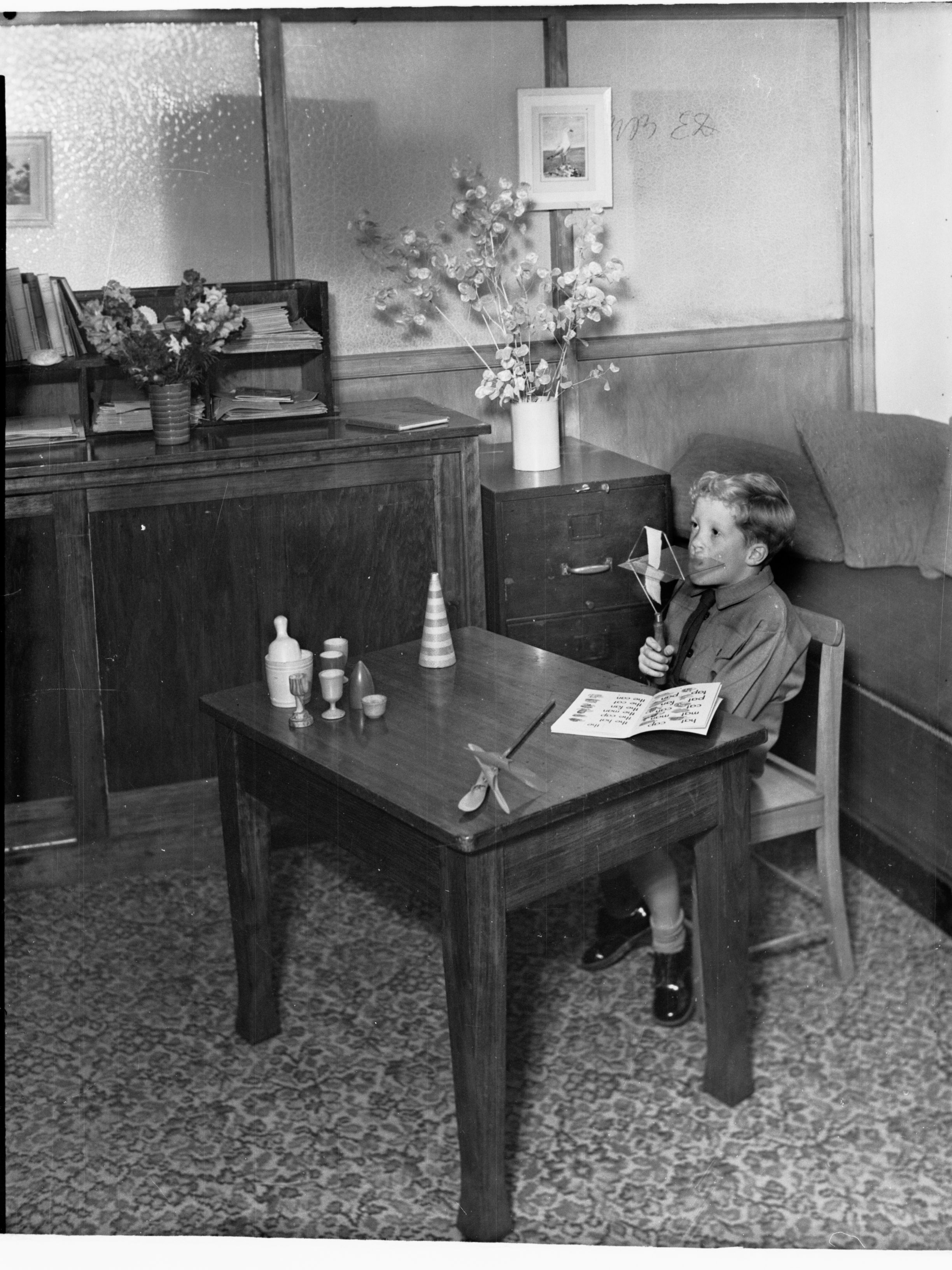
Student doing speech therapy

== Social effects ==
Having a speech disorder can have negative social effects, especially among young children. Those with a speech disorder can be targets of bullying because of their disorder. This bullying can result in decreased self-esteem. Religion and culture also play a large role in the social effects of speech disorders. For example, in many African countries like Kenya cleft palates are largely considered to be caused by a curse from God. This can cause people with cleft palates to not receive care in early childhood, and end in rejection from society. For those with speech disorders, listeners reactions are often negative, which may correlate negative effects to self-esteem. It has also been shown that adults tend to view individuals with stutters in more negative ways than those without them.

== Language disorders ==
Language disorders are usually considered distinct from speech disorders, although they are often used synonymously.

Speech disorders refer to problems in producing the sounds of speech or with the quality of voice, where language disorders are usually an impairment of either understanding words or being able to use words and do not have to do with speech production.

== See also ==
- British Stammering Association
- Extensions to the International Phonetic Alphabet for Disordered Speech
- FOXP2
- SCN3A
- KE family
- Language disorder
- Manner of articulation
- Motor speech disorders
- Revoicer
- Speech perception
- Speech repetition
