= Infantile speech =

Speech disorder

Infantile speech, pedolalia, baby talk, infantile perseveration, or infantilism is a speech disorder, persistence of early speech development stage beyond the age when it is normally expected. It is characterized by the omission of some sounds and the substitution of standard speech sounds observed in children in early developmental stages.

== See also ==
- Speech sound disorder
