= Motor planning =

Processes controlling bodily movement

In psychology and neuroscience, motor planning is a set of processes related to the preparation of a movement that occurs during the reaction time (the time between the presentation of a stimulus to a person and that person's initiation of a motor response). Colloquially, the term applies to any process involved in the preparation of a movement during the reaction time, including perception-related and action-related processes.

== Broad vs. narrow definition ==
In broad definition, motor planning is referred to as any process that occurs during reaction time (RT) as a preparation of the incoming movement. This definition can include motion preparations that are not strictly motor-related. For example, the identification of a task-relevant stimulus is captured by the usual meaning of the term, "motor planning", but this identification process is not strictly motor-related.

Wong and colleagues (2015) have proposed a narrower definition to include only movement-related processes: "Specification of the movement trajectory for the desired action, a description of how the end-effector will produce such an action, and finally a description of the full set of the joint trajectories or muscle activations required to execute the movement."

== Stages and theoretical models of motor planning ==
Motor planning is explained by several competing and complementary theoretical models. Most commonly, motor planning in broad definition is explained to have three distinct hierarchical processes.

=== First stage: Perceptual decision-making ===
This process is first triggered by attention, where a person selects an object of the interest from their surrounding environment. They then apply a cognitive rule (e.g.,"reach to the red mug"), which then lead to a motor goal formation, where attention and the rules are combined to identify the desired outcomes.

=== Second stage: Motor planning (narrow definition) ===
==== 1. Posture-based planning ====
Rosenbaum et al. (2004) introduced a posture-based planning model, which first identifies a best-suited limb configuration or goal posture to perform a goal task, followed by movement specification to achieve that posture. After selecting a posture, a system choose a movement trajectory to reach it.

==== 2. Trajectory optimisation ====
The brain uses an internal mechanism called inverse model or forward model. Inverse model generates motor commands to achieve the desired trajectories automatically. When performing novel task, people are more likely to rely on forward model, which predict sensory outcomes from the given motor commands. Rosenbaum et al. proposed that one motion can carry multiple purposes,(e.g., reaching the red mug while avoiding to touch the stacked glass plates), and such constraints form a hierarchy to resolve indeterminacy (elimination by aspects). Highest level constraint is the final goal ("reach the red mug") and the lower constraints include avoidance of obstacles, effort minimisation and ensuring final stability of the postures. Out of the movement options, central neural system choose the one to execute through optimal selection based on several aspects.

- Limb dynamics – Each limb segment (finger, wrist, forearm) has an optimal amplitude-frequency combination for efficient movement, and longer and heavier limbs (e.g., forearm) favour low-frequency, large amplitude motion while shorter limbs favour otherwise. Optimal trajectory is often selected based on the limb resonance and end-posture comfort.
- Motor memory – Despite the mechanisms to achieve motion-wise efficiency, people often rely on a strategy that was previously used, even if it is effortful and suboptimal. Any goal postures always have multiple solutions, and a choice of trajectories from the possible options can sometimes depend on their previous learning experience. However, when performing a new task and memory is irrelevant, people usually have default bias toward optimisation.
- Optimal feedback control (OFC) – OFC, proposed by Todorov & Jordan (2002) gives sensory feedbacks to guide and correct movements. Recent research added that trajectory selection process involves OFC, which tries to minimise cost of the ongoing motion such as effort, accuracy and probabilistic success on top of the local optimisation of limb segments, especially when performing under uncertainty. This model explains that movements are continuously guided and corrected by the OFC that occur simultaneously as execution, and muscle commands are given to meet the highest constraint while following a rough trajectory sketched by the mechanism. Multiple solutions for the end goal are remained, and feedback evaluate them and commands to switch between one trajectory to another if necessary.

=== Third stage: Execution ===
Motor commands generated in the second stage command the muscles to move, tailoring them according to the OFC given simultaneously. Another internal mechanism, called forward models, which predict sensory outcomes from the given motor commands, combined with inverse models, is used to give feedbacks for motion corrections.

== Neural system involved in motor planning ==
A dispersed network of cortical and subcortical areas supports motor planning through preparatory activity. This network uses dynamic interactions to integrate motor commands, internal states, and perceptual decisions. Despite the many attempts to identify roles of each regions, the explicit function of them is still under research.

=== Cortical regions ===
Though the roles differ, primary motor cortex (M1) and ventral and dorsal premotor cortices (PMv, PMd) are found to be the central in motor planning.

PMs translate high-level goals into motor commands, with neurons selectively firing for specific movement required.

Although some researches diverge in the contribution level of M1 in planning stage, more animal studies suggest that preparatory activities are stronger in PM, while M1 is more dominant in movement execution. An fMRI study with human revealed there was less activity in M1 during motor-imagery compared to execution. (Motor imagery and motor planning share neural mechanism especially when using forward model.) However the precise and distinct role of M1 in motor planning is still under research, lacking variation in task nature and sample species.

=== Subcortical regions ===
- Thalamus – Thalamus is responsible for maintaining preparatory activity via bidirectical communications (reciprocal loops) with motor cortex.
- Basal ganglia – Basal ganglia interacts with associated cortical region to select task and participates in identifying appropriate motor action for the given behaviour goal and apply corresponding cognitive rules, and suppress competing/irrelevant movements.
- Cerebellum – There is a general agreement by researches on that cerebellum fine-tunes timing of the motion.

These subcortical and cortical regions form multiple loops directing to each other and within the regions, passing sensory informations, commands and feedbacks for execution.

== Motor planning in development ==
=== Early childhood (ages 4–7) ===
Children in this stage are able to perform simple motion, but have difficulty with more complex movement. They often choose the easiest way to grasp objects, prioritising the start-position comfort rather than adjusting their grip for further movement or end-state comfort.

=== Middle childhood (ages 8–9) ===
This stage is a transition period where children significantly develops motion planning ability. Several studies show temporal decline in planning efficiency (e.g., one-handed strategies) compared to 6-years-old, before being able to coordinating both hands together. This could be due to integrating more sensory and cognitive cues. RT decreases as the age increases, although the time taken for simple task completion is around the same among the most children

=== Late childhood (10–12) ===
Most children are able to use end-state comfort strategy by age 10, and adopt efficient two-handed coordination, while highly complex tasks remain challenging.
