= Market Education =

Book by Andrew J. Coulson

- Author: Andrew J. Coulson
- Publication date: 1999
- ISBN: 9781560004080

Market Education: The Unknown History is a 1999 book by education researcher Andrew J. Coulson outlining the historical role that markets have played in the provision and evolution of education, and arguing that a more free market in education would lead to its improvement faster.

== Reception ==
=== Reviews ===
James E. Bond reviewed the book for The Independent Review. The review was generally favorable. Bond's chief criticism was that "Coulson is less prescient about the fatal flaw in his approach: the inability of the market to supply education to the poor." Bond was not satisfied with Coulson's attempt to argue that a free market in education would lead to a robust availability of private scholarships. Bond predicted that many entrenched interests would oppose the book vociferously.

Allison Halpern of the University of Wisconsin-Madison wrote a highly critical review of the book in Education Review. She wrote, "While Coulson's case for privatized education may be convincing for readers who have not followed closely the debates over school choice, it is seriously flawed." Coulson's reply to Halpern was also published by Education Review.

Melvin Dubnick and Martin West wrote separate reviews of the book for H-Net Online.

Catherine Lugg reviewed the book for the History of Education Quarterly. Her review was critical of Coulson's choice of sources, including sources she considered biased and unreliable. She wrote, "It is painfully apparent that the author has taken a buffet-style approach to history. He slops tasty tidbits of bona fide research onto his plate, only to slather these morsels with "magic mushroom" sauces of propaganda. The result is a highly incredible and surrealistic history." Coulson replied to the review on H-Net Online. He wrote, "Ms. Lugg's review of _Market Education_ is engaging, and her use of metaphor and hyperbole is effective on an emotional level. The reference to "magic mushroom sauce" is especially colorful. But rhetoric is not reason and metaphor is not evidence. In support of her sweeping condemnation of the book, she objects to just two of its 1,100 citations and takes issue with a single aspect of just one of the dozen historical case studies presented. Even if all three of these objections were valid they would amount to nit-picking rather than to the "egregious" and "systemic" flaws she claims them to be. As it happens, however, both of the sources that displease her are corroborated by primary evidence, and her charge against the case study is misguided."

David Hardy reviewed the book for the Journal of School Choice.

== Later work by the author ==
In his later career at the Mackinac Center for Public Policy and then as Director of the Center for Educational Freedom at the Cato Institute from 2005 to 2015, Coulson built on the work he did in his book.

In 2017 PBS showed School Inc., a series about education in which Coulson acted as creator/writer/host. Coulson died in 2016 before completing the series.

== See also ==
- Inside American Education, a 1992 book by Thomas Sowell critical of the state of education in the United States
