= White Girl Bleed a Lot =

2012 book by Colin Flaherty

- Author: Colin Flaherty
- Publisher: WND Books
- Publication date: 2013
- Publication place: United States
- Media type: Print, e-book
- Pages: 380

White Girl Bleed a Lot: The Return of Racial Violence to America and How the Media Ignore It is a 2012 book by Colin Flaherty. It deals with race and crime in the United States, particularly black-on-white crime. It was first published by CreateSpace. The books title relates to a quote made during a racially motivated series of assaults on July 4, 2011, in Milwaukee. A crowd of nearly 100 blacks attacked a group of white teenagers on a picnic, leading to the beating of one white woman. A black woman in the crowd was recorded saying, “Oh, white girl bleed a lot.”

== Key themes ==
- The book documents numerous incidents of black mob violence against non-black individuals and property, often accompanied by racial slurs and hate speech.
- Flaherty argues that the media and law enforcement often ignore or downplay these incidents, perpetuating a culture of denial and cover-up.
- The book highlights the phenomenon of the “knockout game,” where individuals, often black, target unsuspecting victims, usually white, with the goal of rendering them unconscious through a single punch.
- Flaherty presents a comprehensive analysis of the issue, including quotes from various commentators, such as Rev. Jesse Lee Peterson and John Derbyshire, who have spoken out about the problem.

== Reception and criticism ==
White Girl Bleed a Lot has sparked debate and controversy surrounding the topic of racial violence and its coverage in the media. The book has also inspired discussions about the need for greater awareness and action to address these issues.

Thomas Sowell praised the book in the National Review, linking it to his own Intellectuals and Society, and suggested that the book and its message were being ignored or silenced. Radio show host Larry Elder wrote that according to Flaherty's book "the knockout game has gone national." Cathy Young in Newsday brought up the book when discussing the knockout game, and mentioned how she felt Flaherty, while in error in a particular case, brings forth a "narrative [that] raises a painful question" about the media's failure to report incidents accurately when perpetrators are black. That failure, she cautions, undermines the media's credibility and actually risks encouraging racist paranoia.

Flaherty's work has also drawn journalistic and scholarly criticism. Alex Pareene, the editor of Gawker, after checking the sources cited, claimed in Salon that the figures presented by Flaherty were inflated and the reporting misleading. In the Los Angeles Times, Robin Abcarian also wrote that Flaherty's numbers were out of proportion, feeling that Flaherty, amongst other conservative media personalities, was only trying to incite anxiety. Leah Nelson, writing for the Southern Poverty Law Center's Hatewatch blog, noted Flaherty's column at WorldNetDaily and labeled him a "white nationalist propagandist." In The Huffington Post, Terry Kreppel of Media Matters for America, criticized Flaherty, in his postings on WND, and called his postings and book race baiting.
