= Charter Schools and Their Enemies =

2020 book by Thomas Sowell

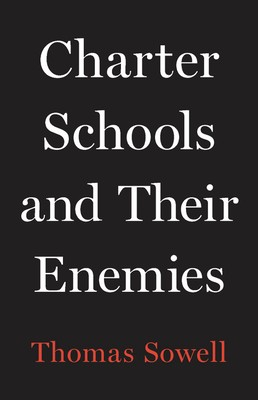
- First edition
- Author: Thomas Sowell
- Language: English
- Subject: Education
- Publisher: Basic Books New York
- Publication date: June 30, 2020
- Publication place: United States
- Media type: Print (Hardcover and Paperback), and audiobook
- Pages: 276
- ISBN: 978-1-541-67513-1
- OCLC: 1137840292
- Preceded by: Discrimination and Disparities

Charter Schools and Their Enemies is a 2020 book by American economist, social theorist and author Thomas Sowell, in which he compares the educational outcomes of school children educated at charter schools with those at conventional public schools. He argues that charter schools on the whole do significantly better in terms of educational outcomes than conventional schools.

He believes the school system in the United States is in need of reform and makes the case for why the charter school movement is a force for good and how it will help to bring about that reform. It is Sowell's 56th book and was published on his 90th birthday.

== Summary ==
Public opinion on charter schools is very divided and Sowell tries to make the case in favour of them. He argues that charter schools are better than conventional schools in numerous ways, but most importantly on educational outcomes. He dispels many claims made about charter schools and tries to demonstrate the need for educational reform in the United States.

Sowell begins by presenting the case of what he sees as a highly successful school in America; Dunbar High School. He highlights the school because he regards it as an institute that brought huge success for black students in the years 1870 to 1955, which showed that this was possible many years before Brown v. Board of Education, which he has criticised. He believes the charter school movement could produce schools as good as Dunbar High but has not yet due to the constant push back against charter schools from teachers unions, politicians, and regulators who want to make charter schools more like traditional schools. The hostility of those critics, Sowell says, is a result of the corrupting influence of money, power, and political advantage, but rarely the best interests of children.

He points out that charter schools have been in high demand by parents ever since they began in the 1990s with long waiting lists and a lottery for available slots. This has happened despite strong political and procedural pressures against them.

Sowell presents a great deal of data and statistics comparing the performance of students within charter and public schools. He concludes that charter schools are an effective weapon against an "achievement gap" between white students and black students with the former often doing better than the latter in educational outcomes at normal schools.

Sowell claims that charter schools are much more accountable than most typical public schools. This is because while not all charter schools are successful, they can have their charters revoked which cuts off access to public funds. This means that charter schools are incentivised to do better and are accountable to those who are in control of the funding. This, he writes, is not the case with traditional public schools which do not always have their access to public funds cut off if they start to fail.

A notable quotation from Sowell in regards to dangers to education and charter schools was pointed out in a review by the National Review magazine: "What we can do is consider in advance what kind of general principles and specific institutions seem promising. Perhaps the most important of these general principles is that schools exist for the education of children. Schools do not exist to provide iron-clad jobs for teachers, billions of dollars in union dues for teachers unions, monopolies for educational bureaucracies, a guaranteed market for teachers college degrees or a captive audience for indoctrinators".

== Reception ==
Kevin D. Williamson praised the book in National Review, calling it "a bloodbath for Sowell’s intellectual opponents … a neutron bomb in the middle of the school-reform debate.” Charter school advocate Robert Pondiscio agreed and said that the book was a “a metaphorical punch in the nose” for charter school critics and that Sowell “provide[s] ammunition for the fight,” predicting that the book would “embarrass charter critics.” Economists Gary M. Galles and Art Carden, in the Independent Review and the Cato Journal respectively, also wrote positive reviews of the book.

Glenn Sacks, co-chairman of teachers union United Teachers Los Angeles, argues that the high test scores of charter schools are a result of only top students being allowed into charter schools. He cites former Assistant Secretary of Education Diane Ravitch who claimed that charter schools consist only of "the most motivated students and their families" and a study by professor Gordon Lafer that claimed charter admission policies screen out underperforming students who would be the neediest and most expensive to serve. Sowell argues that these criticisms are either invalid or blown out of proportion relative to the benefits of many charter schools, especially for demographic groups that have typically been underserved by their local school district, such as minority and low income populations.
