= Wealth, Poverty and Politics =

2015 book by Thomas Sowell

Wealth, Poverty and Politics An International Perspective
- First edition cover
- Author: Thomas Sowell
- Language: English
- Genre: Non-fiction
- Publisher: Basic Books
- Publication place: United States
- ISBN: 0465082939
- OCLC: 949009674
- Preceded by: Basic Economics (5th edition)
- Followed by: Discrimination and Disparities

Wealth, Poverty and Politics: An International Perspective is a book by American economist and social theorist Thomas Sowell. It was originally published by Basic Books in 2015, with an updated version published in 2016. In the work, Sowell argues against the notion that economic equality is solely natural, and examines geographic, cultural, social, and political factors that have contributed to the wealth of groups and nations.

== Reception ==
The response to the book is broadly aligned with partisan views, with support coming mostly from conservative and right-wing critics, and general criticism from politically central and left-leaning publications and journalists.

Writing in The Washington Post, Steven Pearlstein argued that Sowell's pinning of the blame for black poverty on multiculturalism and welfare is unconvincing, and added that "ghetto culture" cannot explain the problems in white America. Pearlstein wrote that the book "is filled with such instances of overreach" and stated, "What we [...] learn from Wealth, Poverty and Politics is that there is apparently no level of inequality of income or opportunity that Thomas Sowell would consider unacceptable." Sowell himself denied accepting unequal opportunity in a Townhall response to Pearlstein.

A writer for Kirkus Reviews provided a mixed response to the book, writing that Sowell's "implied argument that cultural considerations must inform any serious attempt at improving the economic prospects of an underperforming nation or group merits serious consideration". Despite saying that Sowell too often downplays factors that don't support his conservatism, the reviewer also said that Sowell "raises many inconvenient facts that should trouble advocates of diversity and cultural relativism, and he effectively refutes progressives' excuses for why their approaches to eliminating poverty have too often produced government dependence and social breakdown."

In a column for conservative publication The Independent Review, Gary M. Galles of religious college Pepperdine University stated that Sowell "thinks carefully and creatively through widely held premises and the narratives they support, bolstering his analysis with a vast array of evidence that offers insights for the intellectually curious". Galles argued that the author is effective in showing how "massive variations in access to ideas and culture, as well as goods and services, overwhelm any expectation of equality of productivity". In The Washington Times, Wes Vernon lauded the book as a "calmly phrased but damning indictment", praising Sowell's "mountains of research" as disproving opposing arguments. A reviewer for Publishers Weekly wrote, "Open-minded readers will find Sowell’s directness, honesty, and common sense refreshing and often wise." George Mason University economist Walter E. Williams gave the 2016 updated edition a positive review, particularly praising the discussion of earnings differences.

Reihan Salam of National Review criticized Sowell's view on the chief obstacles facing poor native-born blacks, suggesting that their problems "can be explained at least in part by the failure of governments to protect African Americans from violence. For much of U.S. history, officialdom turned a blind eye to 'black-on-black' violence, which in effect meant that predators routinely got away with murder".
