= A Conflict of Visions =

1987 book by Thomas Sowell

- Cover of the hardcover edition
- Author: Thomas Sowell
- Language: English
- Publisher: William Morrow & Co
- Publication date: January 1987
- Publication place: United States
- Media type: Print
- Pages: 273 pp.
- ISBN: 978-0688069124
- Followed by: Preferential Policies

A Conflict of Visions is a book by Thomas Sowell. It was originally published in 1987; a revised edition appeared in 2007.

== Summary ==
Sowell's opening chapter attempts to answer the question of why the same people tend to be political adversaries in issue after issue, when the issues vary enormously in subject matter and sometimes hardly seem connected to one another. The root of these conflicts, Sowell claims, are the "visions", or the intuitive feelings that people have about human nature; different visions imply radically different consequences for how they think about everything from war to justice.

The rest of the book describes two basic visions, the "unconstrained" and "constrained" visions, which are thought to capture opposite ends of a continuum of political thought on which one can place many contemporary Westerners, in addition to their intellectual ancestors of the past few centuries.

The book could be compared with George Lakoff's 1996 book Moral Politics, which aims to answer a very similar question.

Sowell's book has been published both with and without the subtitle "Ideological Origins of Political Struggles".

Steven Pinker's book The Blank Slate calls Sowell's explanation the best theory given to date. In his book, Pinker refers to the "unconstrained vision" as the "utopian vision" and the "constrained vision" as the "tragic vision".

== The competing visions ==
Sowell lays out these concepts in his A Conflict of Visions, and The Vision of the Anointed. These two visions encompass a range of ideas and theories.

=== The unconstrained vision ===
Sowell argues that the unconstrained vision relies heavily on the belief that human nature is essentially good. Those with an unconstrained vision distrust decentralized processes and are impatient with large institutions and systemic processes that constrain human action. They believe there is an ideal solution to every problem, and that compromise is never acceptable. Collateral damage is merely the price of moving forward on the road to perfection. Sowell often refers to them as "the self anointed." Ultimately they believe that man is morally perfectible. Because of this, they believe that there exist some people who are further along the path of moral development, have overcome self-interest and are immune to the influence of power and therefore can act as surrogate decision-makers for the rest of society.

=== The constrained vision ===
Sowell argues that the constrained vision relies heavily on the belief that human nature is essentially unchanging and that man is naturally inherently self-interested, regardless of the best intentions. Those with a constrained vision prefer the systematic processes of the rule of law and experience of tradition. Compromise is essential because there are no ideal solutions, only trade-offs. Those with a constrained vision favor empirical evidence and time-tested structures and processes over intervention and personal experience. Ultimately, the constrained vision demands checks and balances and refuses to accept that all people could put aside their innate self-interest.

== Reception ==
Jonathan Haidt referenced Sowell's work in his book The Righteous Mind: Why Good People are Divided by Politics and Religion.

Steven Pinker referenced the ideas described by Sowell (in this book and the later book The Vision of the Anointed) in his book The Blank Slate: The Modern Denial of Human Nature.

Edward Younkins wrote an introduction to Sowell's work in The Social Critic.
