= Affirmative Action Around the World =

2004 book by Thomas Sowell

- First edition
- Author: Thomas Sowell
- Language: English
- Subject: Affirmative action
- Publisher: Yale University Press
- Publication date: 2004
- Publication place: United States
- Media type: Print (Hardcover)
- Pages: 239
- ISBN: 0300101996
- Dewey Decimal: 331.13/3 21
- LC Class: HF5549.5.A34 S684 2004

Affirmative Action Around the World: An Empirical Study is a 2004 nonfiction work by economist Thomas Sowell.

== Summary ==
Already known as a critic of affirmative action or race-based hiring and promotion, Sowell, himself African-American, analyzes the specific effects of such policies on India, Malaysia, Sri Lanka, and Nigeria, four countries with longer multiethnic histories and then compares them with the recent history of the United States in this regard. He finds that "Such programs have at best a negligible impact on the groups they are intended to assist."

A sample of his thinking about perpetual racial preferences is this passage from page 7:

"People differ—and have for centuries.... Any “temporary” policy whose duration is defined by the goal of achieving something that has never been achieved before, anywhere in the world, could more fittingly be characterized as eternal."

According to Dutch Martin's review of this book:

Among the common consequences of preference policies in the five-country sample are:

- They encourage non-preferred groups to redesignate themselves as members of preferred groups (1) to take advantage of group preference policies;
- They tend to benefit primarily the most fortunate among the preferred group (e.g. black millionaires), often to the detriment of the least fortunate among the non-preferred groups (e.g. poor whites);
- They reduce the incentives of both the preferred and non-preferred to perform at their best—the former because doing so is unnecessary and the latter because it can prove futile—thereby resulting in net losses for society as a whole.

Sowell concludes: "Despite sweeping claims made for affirmative action programs, an examination of their actual consequences makes it hard to support those claims, or even to say that these programs have been beneficial on net balance."

== Arguments ==
First, in repudiating what he refers to as the "myths" surrounding affirmative action, he contends that blacks had both higher rates of labor force participation and higher marriage rates before the 1960s' large-scale institution of civil rights laws and policies countering discrimination. Much of the economic upturn, which Sowell attributes entirely to personal initiative, must be put in the context of the postwar economic boom, which was accompanied by the widespread availability of manual jobs requiring little education. The post-civil rights period coincided with an economy that was experiencing steady de-industrialization. Significantly, manufacturing jobs that had been stepping-stones into the middle class for blacks from the U.S. South and immigrants from southern, eastern, and central Europe in the past, were fast eroding.

Second, he questions the conventional wisdom that has evolved around affirmative action. He claims that there is nothing beyond assertions and anecdotes to prove that diversity enhances the college experience for all students; that there is no systematic evidence that black "role models" are essential to the education of black students; that a "critical mass" of black students in the academic setting might actually be detrimental to the education of black students; and finally that black studies programs are "ideological crusades" which provide sanctuary for intellectual lightweights. It is this last point which makes up the bulk of his discussion on how affirmative action has led to a mismatch between minority students and the institutions they attend, setting them up either for failure or turning them out to be bad doctors and lawyers. Sowell asserts that colleges and universities which pledge to "develop minds and skills that serve society at large cannot be subordinated to the impossible task of equalizing probabilities of academic success for people born and raised in circumstances which have handicapped their development, even if for reasons that are not their fault and are beyond their control" (p. 153).

Third, Sowell is highly critical of William Bowen and Derek Bok, former university presidents of Princeton and Harvard, whose 1998 book The Shape of the River caused quite a stir when it revealed how race-sensitive admissions policies increased the likelihood that blacks would be admitted to selective universities and that upon graduation these students were more likely to become leaders of community and social service organizations.

Fourth, he argues that in the United States as in other countries, the original rationale for affirmative action has little to do with how it actually is practiced. The disproportionate benefit that well-placed, affluent blacks receive, with little if any going to those who continue to suffer the most, has discredited the ethos of affirmative action more than anything. On this last point, few disagree.

== Critical reception ==
The Economist magazine praised the book as "terse, well argued and utterly convincing" and "crammed with striking anecdotes and statistics."

Economic historian Stuart Jones called the book a "brilliant empirical study of affirmative action" and stated that it "deserves to be read widely, especially by politicians and development economists."

A review in the International Journal of Legal Information wrote that "Affirmative Action around the World is an informative, well-written book. The author cogently presents his arguments against group preferences and does not attempt to provide a comprehensive global analysis." The review also notes that there "is no single study that incorporates the five profiled counties or studies the aspects of affirmative action raised by Sowell for each country. The book does not contain the graphs, charts, or variable equations one might expect in a scientific paper."

A review in The Yale Journal of International Law wrote that the book is "an extensively researched, accessibly written, and refreshingly comparative addition to the conservative canon." According to the review, the most important shortcoming of the book is that it "lacks a comprehensive discussion of alternatives to affirmative action and possible ramifications of other options."

Michael Bérubé, writing for The Nation magazine, agreed with Sowell's arguments that affirmative action has gone far beyond what the Civil Rights Act of 1965 intended and that preferential benefits for ethnic groups without historical oppression in the United States are unjustified but criticized Sowell's association of affirmative action with unrest in the countries selected for the study and pointed out the United States has never implemented the racial preference systems of those foreign countries.

Economist Cecilia Conrad wrote that the book "might have been more accurately titled The Case Against Affirmative Action Around the World." Conrad concludes that the book "succeeds in establishing the costs of the policy are similar around the world, but it fails as an overall assessment of affirmative action."

A review in Ethics & International Affairs wrote that "Sowell leaps to conclusions without adequate evidence and oversimplifies complex issues" and that Sowell only presents a "selection of the facts." Additionally, the review concludes that the book is ridden with Sowell's "values and theoretical preconceptions."
