= The Housing Boom and Bust =

2009 book by Thomas Sowell

- Cover of the hardcover edition
- Author: Thomas Sowell
- Language: English
- Subjects: United States housing bubble, Subprime mortgage crisis
- Publisher: Basic Books
- Publication date: April 24, 2009 (1st edition); February 23, 2010 (revised edition)
- Publication place: United States
- Media type: Print (Hardcover and Paperback)
- Pages: 192 (1st edition); 233 (revised edition)
- ISBN: 978-0-465-01880-2
- Followed by: Intellectuals and Society

The Housing Boom and Bust is a non-fiction book written by Thomas Sowell about the United States housing bubble and following subprime mortgage crisis. The book was initially published on April 24, 2009, by Basic Books and reissued on February 23, 2010.

== Summary ==
Sowell, a Senior Fellow at the Hoover Institution, explores political and economic causes of the American housing crisis. For example, he links the Community Reinvestment Act to decreased lending standards that resulted in an increase of subprime mortgages, as the law forced banks to set up quotas of lending to minorities. As a result, "lenders had to resort to 'innovative or flexible' standards."

He also contrasts housing prices for modest middle-class homes in California and Texas and theorizes that California, with open space and various other zoning laws, had homes that were more expensive than those of similar size in Texas, which lacks such laws. Politically, Sowell targets the George W. Bush administration and Congress members of both major political parties for obstructing audits of Fannie Mae and Freddie Mac and enabling banks to make highly risky housing loans. Regarding housing prices, Reason magazine summarized his stance: "the immense local variability in housing prices and failed loans reveals that the government mistook a set of local problems for a national one."

== Critical reception ==
Walter E. Williams, a colleague of Sowell and economics professor at George Mason University, called the book "an eye-opener for anyone interested in the truth about the collapse of the housing market that played a major role in our financial market crisis." For The American Spectator magazine, Joseph Lawler considered The Housing Boom and Bust "an examination of the ruling class's inability to leave well enough alone."

Art Carden wrote in a positive review in Forbes that the book would appeal to both specialists and non-specialists, and argued, "Morality tales featuring clear villains, easy-to-identify victims and valiant saviors riding to the rescue might be appealing, but they obscure the systemic problems that produced the crisis. [...] Sowell, by contrast, offers a more complete explanation in which he identifies the relevant actors, the incentives they faced, and the historical conditions they faced." Robert J. Samuelson, reviewing the book for Newsweek, commented: "Although one-sided, Sowell's account qualifies the standard story that greedy investment bankers and mortgage brokers caused the whole crisis."
