= Applied Economics: Thinking Beyond Stage One =

2003 book by Thomas Sowell

- First edition cover
- Author: Thomas Sowell
- Subject: Economics
- Genre: Nonfiction
- Publisher: Basic Books
- Publication date: 2003
- ISBN: 0465081436

Applied Economics: Thinking Beyond Stage One (ISBN 0465081436) is a 2003 nonfiction work by economist Thomas Sowell. The second edition (ISBN 978-0465003457) came out in 2008.

Sowell discusses how basic economics is generally misapplied because politicians think only in Stage One. Stage One is the immediate result of an action, without determining what happens then. He argues that many politicians cannot see beyond Stage One because they do not think beyond the next election. He gives as an example of Stage One Thinking, a State government which raises taxes on a business. The immediate result is more revenue for the State government. However, over the course of time, that business might move bits and pieces of the company to another state or new businesses may choose another state to place a new factory. Over the course of time, the State will lose revenue because businesses will go to other states.
