= Greenhouse effect (United States Supreme Court) =

Theory that voting grows more liberal throughout the term of a conservative justice (1992)

The Greenhouse effect is a theory of U.S. Supreme Court justices' behavior that postulates a tendency of conservative Supreme Court Justices to vote with the liberals more often as their careers progress, due to a desire for favorable press coverage. The idea was first proposed by Hoover Institution economist Thomas Sowell and popularized by D.C. Court of Appeals Senior Judge Laurence Silberman in a speech to The Federalist Society in 1992. Silberman said, "It seems that the primary objective of The Times's legal reporters is to put activist heat on recently appointed Supreme Court justices."

The term "Greenhouse" refers to Linda Greenhouse, a Pulitzer Prize winning reporter who covered the Supreme Court for the New York Times for 40 years. The existence of the Greenhouse effect has been challenged by some commentators, who note it presumes a "vast, hegemonic liberal control over the media and academia" and question whether professional decision makers who have "come to their views despite years of elite education and exposure to elite opinion" are really so malleable.

There is evidence that conservative justices may become liberal more often than liberal justices become conservative. Furthermore, the existence of a more general version of the Greenhouse effect, one not restricted to the media but rather "elites" in general or legal elites, is less controversial. For example, 75% of law professors who began their careers after 1986 identify as liberal, while only 10% identify as conservative. Evidence suggests more "elite" journalists identify as liberal than conservative.

== Origins of the theory ==
The Greenhouse effect refers to Linda Greenhouse, a Pulitzer Prize winning New York Times Supreme Court reporter for over three decades, currently a Senior Fellow at Yale Law School. Greenhouse came under fire from conservatives for publicly espousing liberal viewpoints by participating in a 1989 pro-choice march and in remarks at the Radcliffe Institute in 2006.

Greenhouse herself commented on the origins of the theory in an interview with NPR:

Ms. Wertheimer: In a 1992 speech to the Federalist Society, Lawrence Silberman, who is an appeals court judge, referred to the greenhouse effect. By which he partly meant you, and he partly meant activist heat, he said, that the Times legal reporters put on recently appointed justices to try to influence their opinions. It certainly did kind of single you out as being an influential player in the world of the court. Ms. Greenhouse: Well, Judge Silberman is giving credit for coming up with that snarky phrase, but actually, he swiped it off from Tom Bethell, the economist, who had put it in a column shortly before.

It is unclear whether Ms. Greenhouse meant to refer to Mr. Bethell or Mr. Sowell. Mr. Bethell, an editor at the American Spectator and another Hoover Institution fellow, started the "Strange New Respect Awards", which are given to conservatives who have become more liberal. Ms. Greenhouse is said by some to have inspired the award. Mr. Sowell is more often cited as the origin of the name of the theory.

== Example commentary incorporating the theory ==
Pat Buchanan, a conservative political commentator, wrote the passage below, after quoting Linda Greenhouse in reference to Justice John Paul Stevens' advocating a reconsideration of the death penalty in Kennedy v. Louisiana:

For his defection to the abolitionist camp, the 88-year-old justice was rewarded with her patented deep massage by Linda Greenhouse, the veteran — and after 30 years retiring — Supreme Court reporter of The New York Times: "When Justice John Paul Stevens intervened in a Supreme Court argument on Wednesday to score a few points off the lawyer who was defending the death penalty for the rape of a child, the courtroom audience saw a master strategist at work, fully in command of the flow of the argument and the smallest details of the case. For those accustomed to watching Justice Stevens, it was a familiar sight." ... But had Stevens moved from left to right, rather than the reverse, one imagines Greenhouse's enthusiasm for the "master strategist" would have been well contained. What we see here is a textbook example of what U.S. Judge Laurence Silberman calls "The Greenhouse Effect."

== The Supreme Court and the media ==
Supreme Court author Larry Berkson holds that the Supreme Court has two audiences: the highly attentive legal profession and the less engaged general public. If the Supreme Court is without the general public's backing, its authority may be eroded. However, the Court must remain independent of the ongoing political process. Richard Davis discusses this relationship with the Court and the public as, "the paradox of imagemaking – to engage in imagemaking while denying its existence to maintain the image."

Since the majority of the general public does not have the time, interest or expertise to read the opinions for themselves, they must depend on newspapers, periodicals, radio and TV for its information. Justices have also been known to survey reporters to determine if they were interpreting their opinions as intended. In these ways and more the Court also tried to shape the way the media covers the justices and their decisions. The Supreme Court also receives news of the public's reactions to its decisions through the press. Some scholars have postulated that swing justices, who have disproportionate influence over the court, may be more attuned to public opinion since their own policy preferences are weaker than their colleagues.

The demographics of the Supreme Court reveal that Justices tend to be more highly educated and wealthy relative to the rest of the nation. In 2007, 7 of the 9 justices had a net worth of over a million dollars and all but two of the justices had attended Yale University or Harvard University. Social psychological theory holds that people seek approval from those similar to them, and those they interact with more often. In the court's case, this means Justices may be more influenced by elites than by the public.

== Empirical evidence of the effect's existence ==
Lawrence Baum found some evidence that supports the effect's existence. However, the research is not definitive, as it is hampered by the small sample size of Supreme Court justices in the modern era. Furthermore, much of Baum's research focuses on the influence of "elite" opinion, not just the media. However, the evidence for the influence of "elite" opinion is more robust than the evidence for media specifically.

Amicus curiae briefs and law review articles can influence the court by providing precedents or reasoning to support a position. In West Virginia State Board of Education v. Barnette the court overturned the precedent relating to school prayer that it had established in Minersville School District v. Gobitis just three years earlier, ruling that students did not have to salute the flag, which was applauded by liberals. Notably, 31 out of the 39 law review articles commenting on Gobitis condemned the decision. Justice Hugo Black was said by Justice William O. Douglas to have changed his mind because "he had been reading the papers". In Grutter v. Bollinger, an affirmative action case, 83 out of the 102 amicus briefs supported affirmative action, and briefs filed by "elites" such as Fortune 500 companies, colleges, and states displayed even higher levels for support for affirmative action. In Gannett Co. v. Depasquale the court held that the 6th Amendment didn't guarantee public access to trials. The media erupted in a firestorm of criticism, prompting four Justices to make public statements about the meaning of the case. However, one year later, the court reversed itself in Richmond Newspapers v. Virginia.

Throughout the modern era and in a variety of cases, Supreme Court decisions better reflect the opinions of the highly educated than general public opinion. For example, in 1964, 41.4% of those with post-graduate degrees agreed with the court's position on school prayer compared to only 14.9% of those with lower levels of education. There was an equivalent gulf for Texas v. Johnson, the 1990 decision concerning flag burning. In 2003, in Lawrence v. Texas, which legalized homosexual intercourse in states that had anti-sodomy laws, 75% of people with post-graduate degrees agreed with the court, whereas 51% of those with lower levels of education agreed.

Some of the strongest empirical evidence concerns the difference between conservative Justices who lived in Washington, D.C. before they were nominated and those who did not. The evidence from the modern era is summarized in the table below. The table displays the change in pro-civil liberties votes from Justice's early terms and later terms. A higher percentage of pro-civil liberties votes is generally regarded as more liberal.

Change in percentage of pro-civil liberties votes from terms 1–2 to terms 7–10

Justice	Percentage change
Republican Newcomers	Average = +11.1
Warren	+34.8
Harlan	-.3
Stewart	+10.4
Blackmun	+8.9
Powell	+3.3
Stevens	+3.8
O'Connor	+1.4
Kennedy	+13
Souter	+24.4
D.C. Republicans	Average = -4.7
Burger	-6.9
Rehnquist	-3.7
Scalia	-2.3
Thomas	-5.9
Democrats	Average = -1.5
Brennan	+2
White	-11.6
Marshall	0
Ginsburg	+6.9
Breyer	-4.6

== Notable affected justices ==
Only four of the twenty-six Justices serving since 1937 remained relatively stable. Justice Harry Blackmun was famously said to have "evolved" over his career, becoming much more liberal in later decades; Linda Greenhouse herself wrote an article about Blackmun called "The Evolution of a Justice." Notably, he wrote the opinion in favor of legalizing abortion in Roe v. Wade. This is despite the fact that President Richard Nixon asked Justice Harry Blackmun if "he could resist the Washington cocktail party circuit" before his nomination. Several other Republican appointees shifted to the left, such as Brennan, O'Connor, Souter and Stevens. Conversely, some Democratic appointees have shifted to the right, such as Felix Frankfurter and Byron White, but on the whole in the modern era there have been more shifts to the left than the right. Frankfurter began his career in the 1938 term as a slightly left-of-center Justice, closer to the term's likely median. Virtually from the start of his second term, however, Frankfurter appears to have drifted right. By the conclusion of his tenure, Frankfurter was second only to John M. Harlan II as the Court's most extreme conservative voter; he actually ended his service more firmly planted on the right than Chief Justice Rehnquist. Justice Black's movement to the right was not missed by some commentators. As James F. Simon once wrote, Black's "increasingly brittle, unmistakably conservative tilt" actually proved embarrassing to many of his admirers.

Of sitting justices as of 2012, Justice Anthony Kennedy is noted for having become much more liberal. Kennedy had been expected to be the swing vote overturning Roe v. Wade in Planned Parenthood v. Casey, but instead voted to uphold it, with the evidence suggesting he changed his mind between conference and the final vote. Kennedy had previously changed his mind in Lee v. Weisman, concerning school prayer. Kennedy has been observed to be concerned with how he will go down in history. In an interview given just minutes before Casey was handed down, he said: "Sometimes you don't know if you're Caesar about to cross the Rubicon or Captain Queeg cutting your own tow line." Kennedy displays the concern with his historical image that would lend credence to the Greenhouse effect, for example by having his clerks clip all news stories about him.
