= Dispersed knowledge =

Information that is spread throughout the market and not in the hands of a single agent

Dispersed knowledge in economics is the notion that no single agent has information as to all of the factors which influence prices and production throughout the system. The term has been both expanded upon and popularized by American economist Thomas Sowell.

== Overview ==
Each agent in a market for assets, goods, or services possesses incomplete knowledge as to most of the factors which affect prices in that market. For example, no agent has full information as to other agents' budgets, preferences, resources or technologies, not to mention their plans for the future and numerous other factors which affect prices in those markets.

Market prices are the result of price discovery, in which each agent participating in the market makes use of its current knowledge and plans to decide on the prices and quantities at which it chooses to transact. The resulting prices and quantities of transactions may be said to reflect the current state of knowledge of the agents currently in the market, even though no single agent commands information as to the entire set of such knowledge.

Some economists believe that market transactions provide the basis for a society to benefit from the knowledge that is dispersed among its constituent agents. For example, in his Principles of Political Economy, John Stuart Mill states that one of the justifications for a laissez faire government policy is his belief that self-interested individuals throughout the economy, acting independently, can make better use of dispersed knowledge than could the best possible government agency.

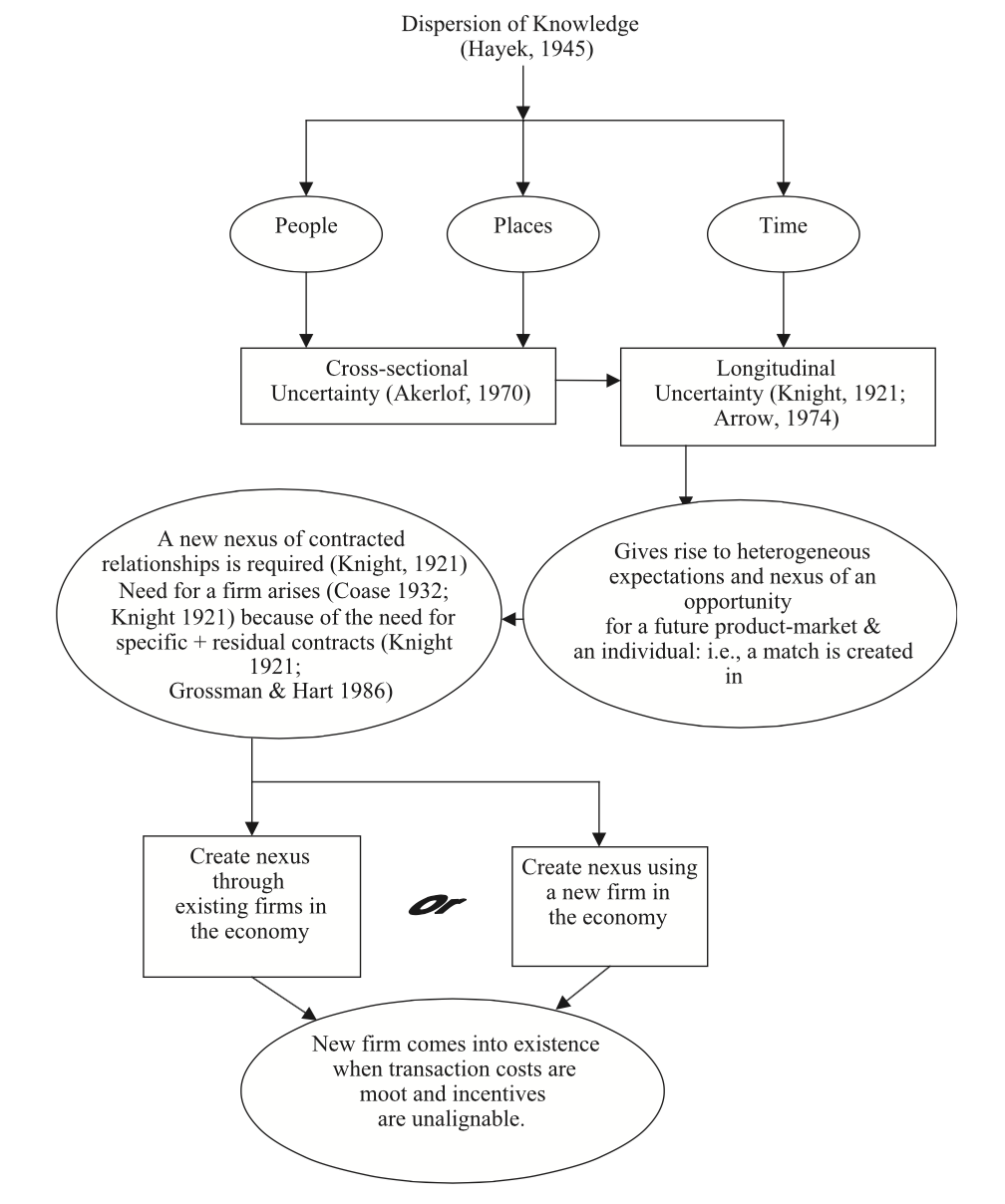

== Key characteristics ==
Friedrich Hayek claimed that "dispersed knowledge is essentially dispersed, and cannot possibly be gathered together and conveyed to an authority charged with the task of deliberately creating order".

Today, the best and most comprehensive book on dispersed knowledge is Knowledge and Decisions by Thomas Sowell, which Hayek called "the best book on general economics in many a year."

== Phenomena ==
- "Dispersed knowledge will give rise to genuine uncertainty, which necessitates the contractual structure that we recognize as a firm."
- "Dispersion of knowledge and genuine uncertainty contribute to the heterogeneity of expectations that must exist in order for one or more individuals to exploit the potential of the contractual structure of the firm."
- "Dispersion of knowledge, genuine uncertainty, and heterogeneous expectations give rise to the nexus of the enterprising individual and the opportunity to discover, create, and exploit new markets."

== Drivers ==
1. Large numbers: Large numbers have a great impact on actions in terms of two aspects. On the one hand, there will be an increase in time and other resource requirements. On the other hand, actors with bounded cognitive resources will lose overview.
2. Asymmetries: Asymmetries have a two-sides effect. Firstly, asymmetries enable more possibilities regarding learning and competence development. Secondly, asymmetries "increase differences between interpretative frameworks and the knowledge and competence profile of the different actors and thus make integration more difficult".
3. Uncertainty: Uncertainty is defined to be one of the drivers of dispersed knowledge which can give rise to management problems.

== Uncertainty ==
Dispersed knowledge will give rise to uncertainty which will lead to different kinds of results.

- 1. Dispersed knowledge causes different opinions and sources in cooperate organizations and it brings creativity.

Richard LeFauve highlights the advantages of organizational structure in companies:

"Before if we had a tough decision to make, we would have two or three different perspectives with strong support of all three. In a traditional organization the bossman decides after he's heard all three alternatives. At Saturn we take time to work it out, and what generally happens is that you end up with a fourth answer which none of the portions had in the first place. but one that all three portions of the organization fully support (AutoWeeR, Oct. 8, 1990. p. 20)."

Companies are supposed to think highly of the dispersed knowledge and make adjustments to meet demands.

- 2. Dispersed knowledge causes management problems at the same time.

Tsoukas stated:

"A firm's knowledge is distributed, not only in a computational sense . . . or in Hayek's (1945, p. 521) sense that the factual knowledge of the particular circumstances of time and place cannot be surveyed as a whole. But, more radically, a firm's knowledge is distributed in the sense that it is inherently indeterminate: nobody knows in advance what that knowledge is or need be. Firms are faced with radical uncertainty: they do not, they cannot, know what they need to know."

== Strategies ==
There are several strategies targeting at the problems caused by dispersed knowledge.

First of all, replacing knowledge by getting access to knowledge can be one of the strategies.

What's more, the capability to complete incomplete knowledge can deal with knowledge gaps created by the dispersed knowledge.

In addition, making a design of institutions with reasonable coordination mechanisms can be regarded as the third strategy.

Besides, resolving organization units into smaller ones should be taken into consideration.

Last but not least, providing more data to decision maker will be helpful for making a correct decision.

== See also ==
- Data acquisition
- Distributed knowledge
- Knowledge sharing
- Polymath
- Transparency
