= Robert Whaples =

American professor of economics

Robert M. Whaples (born 1961) is a professor of economics at Wake Forest University. He is also the editor of The Independent Review.

== Education ==
Whaples graduated from the University of Maryland in 1983 with B.A.'s in economics and history, and received his Ph.D. in 1990 from the University of Pennsylvania. His Ph.D. thesis, "The Shortening of the American Work Week: An Economic and Historical Analysis", won the Allan Nevins Prize from the Economic History Association. It was completed under the supervision of Claudia Goldin.

== Career ==
Whaples began teaching at the University of Wisconsin-Milwaukee in 1988. He moved to Wake Forest University in 1991, and was chair of the economics department there from 2006 to 2013. He served as book review editor of EH.Net since 1996 to 2021 and was director of EH.Net from 2003 to 2008. He has argued that the United States penny should be eliminated, an argument he has supported with a study he conducted regarding the effects of eliminating the penny on prices. In 1995, he conducted a survey of economists regarding the effects of Franklin D. Roosevelt's New Deal policies on the Great Depression, and found that they were almost evenly split regarding whether his policies "served to lengthen and deepen" the Great Depression.

The books he has edited or co-edited include Historical Perspectives on the American Economy: Selected Readings; Public Choice Interpretations of American Economic History; The Handbook of Modern Economic History; The Handbook of Major Events in Economic History; The Economic Crisis in Retrospect: Explanations by Great Economists; Future: Economic Peril or Prosperity?; Pope Francis and the Caring Society; In All Fairness: Liberty, Equality, and the Quest for Human Dignity; and Is Social Justice Just?

== Personal life ==
He and his wife, Regina, have five children (two sons and three daughters).

== Surveys ==
- Whaples, Robert (March 1995). "Where Is There Consensus Among American Economic Historians? The Results of a Survey on Forty Propositions" (PDF). The Journal of Economic History. 55 (1): 139–154. doi:10.1017/S0022050700040602. JSTOR 2123771. S2CID 145691938.
- Whaples, Robert (November 2006). "Do Economists Agree on Anything? Yes!" (PDF). The Economists' Voice. 3 (9): 1–6. doi:10.2202/1553-3832.1156. S2CID 201123406.
- Whaples, Robert (September 2009). "The Policy Views of American Economic Association Members: The Results of a New Survey". Econ Journal Watch. 6 (3): 337–348.
