= Race and Economics =

1975 book by Thomas Sowell

- Paperback cover (1975)
- Author: Thomas Sowell
- Language: English
- Publisher: David McKay Company
- Publication date: 1975
- Publication place: United States
- Media type: Print
- Pages: 276 (paperback)
- ISBN: 0-679-30262-X
- OCLC: 909822366
- Dewey Decimal: 330.9/73
- LC Class: 74019982
- Preceded by: Say's Law: A Historical Analysis
- Followed by: Knowledge and Decisions

Race and Economics is a book by Thomas Sowell, in which the author analyzes the relationship between race and wealth in the United States, specifically contrasting groups like African Americans, Caribbean Americans, Italian Americans, and Japanese Americans. The book was initially published by David McKay Company in 1975 and reprinted by Longman in 1977 and 1982.

The book was praised by Elliott Abrams and James Tobin, and U.S. Supreme Court Justice Clarence Thomas cited the book as a major influence.

== Overview ==
Sowell makes three basic arguments. First, he examines the economic impact of slavery, in the United States, the West Indies, and elsewhere. He distinguishes rural slavery from urban slavery, and circumstances in which blacks so predominated that many economic tasks fell to them of necessity, from circumstances in which blacks were punished for initiative and the development of skills.

Next, he compares the economic skills, circumstances, and successes of American blacks, West Indian blacks, Puerto Ricans, Mexicans, Jews, Irish, Italians, Scottish, and other ethnic groups. He notes statistical quirks; e.g., comparisons of per capita income need to be checked against the median age of the groups concerned. The median age of Russians in the U.S. at the time of the book's publishing (1975) was 47, of the Irish 36, of blacks 23, of Puerto Ricans, 18. Income tends to be higher in higher age cohorts; and unemployment tends to be higher in lower cohorts. If one matches age cohort to age cohort—those in their twenties, in their thirties, in their forties, etc., comparisons are considerably more just.

He also argues that the stark comparisons between white and black people are misleading, for instance, as reviewed by the American Journal of Sociology: "...income from nonlabor sources is grossly underreported and is also concentrated among wealthy whites." Nancy J. Weiss, history professor at Princeton University, also analyzed Sowell's contrast between ethnic groups: "...those who castigate blacks and Puerto Ricans for failing to pull themselves up by their own bootstraps in the manner of Irish or Jewish immigrants of the last century are ignoring a whole complex of cultural and economic factors that need to be understood in historical perspective."

His third argument criticizes past governmental and economic policies, and opens up questions for the future. He has criticisms to make of liberals, radicals, and conservatives, each of whom, he finds, protect their favorite illusions with respect to blacks. In conclusion, Sowell finds that ethnic groups that emphasize individualism, economic assimilation with mainstream society, and emphasis on self-reliance over political power are more successful.

== Reception ==
In a 1977 review for the Journal of Economic Literature, Yale University professor James Tobin had a mixed review, praising the "great deal of wisdom" while criticizing "the long historical view and dispassionate analytical approach". Tobin was complimentary of the book's "disposing of the crude ideologies of exploitation and discrimination" while questioning Sowell's "confidence in the benign outcomes of unfettered markets and social adaptation".

For the American Journal of Sociology, Hofstra University professor Lynn Turgeon called the book "stimulating" and Sowell "a brilliant purveyor of unfashionable economic ideas associated with the Chicago School."

Reviewing the book for Commentary in 1975, Elliott Abrams considered it "extremely useful" for "apply[ing] logic and economic analysis to group history" and "defy[ing] the conventional wisdom".} Allan C. Brownfield called the book "eloquent and honest" in 1976 for The Freeman.

Race and Economics greatly influenced Supreme Court Justice Clarence Thomas.
