= Basic Economics =

2000 book by Thomas Sowell

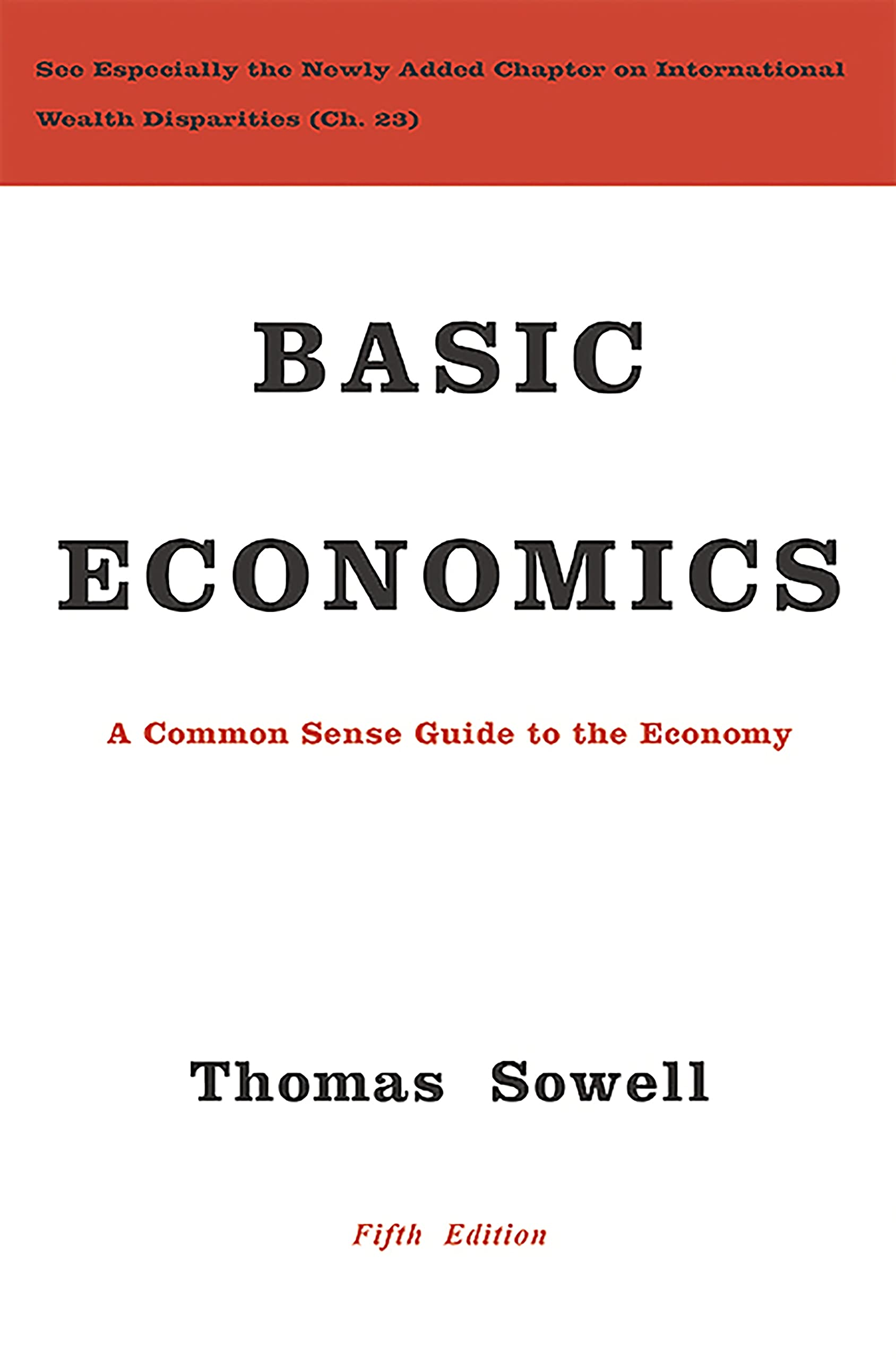
- Fifth Edition cover of Basic Economics
- Author: Thomas Sowell
- Language: English
- Publisher: Basic Books
- Publication date: 2000
- Publication place: United States
- Media type: Print
- Pages: 366 (first edition), 704 (fifth edition) (hardcover)
- ISBN: 978-0465081387
- OCLC: 873007676
- Preceded by: Intellectuals and Race
- Followed by: Wealth, Poverty and Politics

Basic Economics is a non-fiction book by American economist Thomas Sowell published by Basic Books in 2000. The original subtitle was A Citizen's Guide to the Economy, but from the third edition in 2007 on it was subtitled A Common Sense Guide to the Economy.

Basic Economics is focused on how societies create prosperity or poverty for their peoples by the way they organize their economies.

== Content ==
In the introduction to the fifth edition, Sowell writes that he intends to write a book on economics that is written in plain English so that anyone can understand it. The book contains no charts or graphs.

According to the reviewer R. Bastiat in 2004, the book "starts out with a chapter discussing the subject matter and perspective of economics in terms of scarcity and trade-offs. This is followed by six main topical sections, each subdivided into a few short chapters and concluding with an 'overview' that wraps up the main topic of the section." The six main parts of the book cover Prices and Markets, Industry and Commerce, Work and Pay, Time and Risk, The National Economy, and The International Economy. The revised edition concludes with a new section, Special Economic Issues.

This is followed by discussions about the role of prices, incentives, competition, the consequences of price controls, costs as forgone alternatives, trade-offs and substitutes, taxes, and subsidies. The section on industry and commerce delves into the role of markets in coordinating production and distribution in the face of widely dispersed information, and moves on to profit and loss, specialization, monopoly, antitrust, economic regulation, and a comparison of markets versus central planning. Sowell presents arguments about the social and economic consequences of minimum wages, and questions of income distribution, mobility, and poverty. In a 2004 review of the second edition for Cato Journal, R. Bastiat dubbed Basic Economics "an exhilarating tour of the fundamentals of microeconomics, macroeconomics, financial markets, and international trade, with pointed anecdotes and pertinent examples illustrating every analytical point". He praised the Time and Risk section for containing discussion of concepts "that seldom get treated adequately in introductory courses or popular expositions".

== Reception ==
James Higgins argued in Claremont Review of Books that "he scores a bullseye. Anyone who hasn't studied economics formally should read Basic Economics to learn it in a logical, straightforward way. [...] Sowell does not jump in and take sides on big economic issues where serious economists still have legitimate disagreements". Edmund A. Mennis wrote in Business Economics that Sowell gives good examples of government controls having bad consequences, and of the way profits and losses in free markets signal to producers how scarce resources should be used. Mennis referred to the book as "an excellent gift for someone who is interested in learning more about economics without working through the economic jargon, graphs, charts, and equations usually found in textbooks."

There has also been criticism. In an article published in Review of Radical Political Economics, Josef Gregory Mahoney, a Marxist scholar and professor in the East China Normal University, critiqued Sowell's Basic Economics and Applied Economics as "ahistorical", writing that "no knowledge of history, or anything else for that matter" would allow lay readers to place their trust in the works. A reviewer in Kirkus Reviews suggested that Sowell's economics is not truly free of subjective views, and that he downplays the extent of institutionalized racism. The reviewer stated, "Sowell’s economics in a social vacuum is as meaningful as color in the absence of light".

The book has also been reviewed for the academic journals The Appraisal Journal, the Journal of Economic Behavior & Organization, and twice in the micro-review section for The Physics Teacher.

== See also ==
- Government agency
- Laissez-faire
- Rent control
- Supply and demand
