= Francis Boyer Award =

Award formerly presented by American Enterprise Institute for Public Policy Research

The Francis Boyer Award was the highest honor conferred by the American Enterprise Institute for Public Policy Research. It was named for Francis Boyer, a chief executive at Smith, Kline & French in the mid-twentieth century and a strong supporter of AEI who died in 1972. The Boyer Award was replaced in 2003 by the Irving Kristol Award.

== List of recipients ==
Year	Recipient	Nationality	Lecture title
1977	Gerald R. Ford	American	"Toward a Healthy Economy "
1978	Arthur F. Burns	Austro-Hungarian; American	"The Condition of the American Economy "
1979	Paul Johnson	British	"The Things That Are Not Caesar's "
1980	William J. Baroody Sr.	American	Award given posthumously
1981	Henry Kissinger	German; American	"The Realities of Security "
1982	Hanna Holborn Gray	American	"The Higher Learning and the New Consumerism "
1983	Alan Walters	British	"The British Renaissance, 1979-? "
1984	Robert H. Bork	American	"Tradition and Morality in Constitutional Law "
1985	Jeane J. Kirkpatrick	American	"The United States and the World: Setting Limits "
1986	David Packard	American	"Management of America's National Defense "
1987	Paul A. Volcker	American	"Public Service: The Quiet Crisis"
1988	Ronald Reagan	American	"Freedom and Vigilance "
1989	Antonin Scalia	American	
1990	Thomas Sowell	American	"Cultural Diversity: A World View "
1991	Irving Kristol	American	"The Capitalist Future"
1993	Dick Cheney	American	"Getting Our Priorities Right "
1994	Carlos Salinas de Gortari	Mexican	
1995	George F. Will	American	"The Cultural Contradictions of Conservatism "
1996	Alan Greenspan	American	"The Challenge of Central Banking in a Democratic Society "
1997	James Q. Wilson	American	"Two Nations "
1999	Michael Novak	American	"God's Country: Taking the Declaration Seriously "
2000	Christopher DeMuth	American	"After the Ascent: Politics and Government in the Super-Affluent Society "
2001	Clarence Thomas	American	"Be Not Afraid "
2002	Norman Podhoretz	American	"America at War: The One Thing Needful "
