= Black Rednecks and White Liberals =

2005 book by Thomas Sowell

- Hardcover edition
- Author: Thomas Sowell
- Subjects: African American culture, Multiculturalism
- Publisher: Encounter Books
- Publication date: June 25, 2005
- Media type: Print (Hardcover and Paperback)
- Pages: 360 pp.
- ISBN: 978-1-59403-086-4
- OCLC: 57579375

Black Rednecks and White Liberals is a collection of six essays by Thomas Sowell. The collection, published in 2005, explores various aspects of race and culture, both in the United States and abroad. The first essay, the book's namesake, traces the origins of the "ghetto" African-American culture to the culture of Scotch-Irish Americans who migrated from the British Isles to the Antebellum South. The second essay, "Are Jews Generic?", discusses middleman minorities. The third essay, "The Real History of Slavery," discusses the timeline of abolition of slavery and serfdom. The last three essays discuss the history of Germany, African-American education, and a criticism of multiculturalism.

== Essays ==
=== "Black Rednecks and White Liberals" ===
The title essay states Sowell's thesis about the origins of the "black ghetto" culture.

Sowell argues that the black ghetto culture originates in the dysfunctional white southern redneck culture which was prominent in the antebellum South. That culture came, in turn, from the "cracker culture" of Welsh, Highland Scots, Ulster Scots, and border English or "North Britons," who emigrated from the more lawless border regions of Britain in the eighteenth century.

=== "Are Jews Generic?" ===
In the collection's second essay, Sowell explores the origins of anti-Semitism among those harboring jealousy toward Jews for their financial and entrepreneurial successes.

Among other historically persecuted "middlemen minorities" were Lebanese and Chinese immigrant merchants. The resentment is from a perceived "lack of added value" that the middlemen provide, as it is not easily observable.

=== "The Real History of Slavery" ===
In the collection's third essay, Sowell reviews the history of slavery. Contrary to popular impression, which blames Western society and white people as the culprits, Sowell argues that slavery was a universal institution accepted and embraced by nearly all human societies. The world's trade in slaves, followed by slavery itself, was abolished by the British in the 19th century, against opposition in Africa and Asia, where it was considered normal. The economic effects of slavery are also misunderstood since slaves were often a luxury item whose upkeep was a drain on the rich, and the availability of cheap slave labor nowhere resulted in wealthy societies.

=== "Germans and History" ===
The fourth essay features Sowell's argument that Germany should not be defined solely by the 12-year regime of Adolf Hitler from 1933 to 1945. Sowell further argues that Hitler was highly inconsistent in his views toward a unified Germany since he strenuously argued for annexation of the German-dominated Sudetenland, but German-dominated portions of Italy such as Tyrol were ignored in preference for an alliance with Benito Mussolini.

=== "Black Education: Achievements, Myths, and Tragedies" ===
The fifth essay features Sowell's discussion of the early days of Dunbar High School in Washington, DC, and its eventual deterioration from its place of prominence in early black education, which Sowell argues to be a direct consequence of the famed Brown v. Board of Education decision of the US Supreme Court.

Also, Sowell argues that though W. E. B. Du Bois was more activist in his attempts to end Jim Crow laws and other forms of legal discrimination, Booker T. Washington, despite holding a more accommodating position, at times secretly funded and supported efforts to end Jim Crow laws.

=== "History Versus Visions" ===
The final essay features Sowell's criticism of the advantages that multiculturalism is supposed to confer to the society in which it is present.

== Reception ==
In a review for National Review, Jay Nordlinger writes: "What a surprise, Thomas Sowell has written another brilliant book." He adds: "Sowell takes on no issue that is easy, always going for the hard stuff. He is a scholar and writer who chews nails. You may not agree with him — but you must reckon with him."

Washington Post columnist William Raspberry wrote: "If you've followed the writings of Sowell for as long as I have, you'll know that he's not saying anything as simple as racism accounts for today's black poverty. He's saying something much more complex and, to my mind, far more intriguing." Raspberry recommended that Sowell's analysis be read alongside Michael Eric Dyson's book Is Bill Cosby Right? and ended his review by stating "[o]ne thing seems beyond dispute: Maybe we haven't laid racism to rest, but we have reached the point where what we do matters more than what is done to us. That's great, good news."

Diana Schaub, a professor of political science, referred to the book as a "tour de force" and wrote that "Sowell shows that it is illogical to posit racism as the cause of slavery. The enslavement of vulnerable populations...existed for centuries before the advent of racist ideologies...Sowell makes a powerful case that it is the economic activity (and the misunderstanding of that activity as "parasitic"), rather than the mere fact of ethnic or religious differences, that provokes the hostility and violence against middleman minorities...The writings of Thomas Sowell, with their honesty and contrarian untimeliness, are a lesson for all of us."

A review in Publishers Weekly stated: "Many of Sowell's arguments-that the 20th-century resegregation of Northern cities was a response to the uncouthness of black rednecks migrating from the South, or that segregated black schools often succeeded by suppressing redneckism with civilized New England puritanism-will arouse controversy, but these vigorously argued essays present a stimulating challenge to the conventional wisdom."

In a review for The Journal of African American History, economist James B. Stewart criticizes Black Rednecks and Sowell's prior similar works as continuing to "explore ways to pour new wine into old bottles"; Stewart also writes that "Sowell's sloppy treatment of the nature of cultural exchanges leads him to obvious contradictions".

A 2009 study published in Deviant Behavior by sociologists Matthew R. Lee, Shaun A. Thomas, and Graham C. Ousey examined and extended the Cracker Culture/ Black Redneck thesis and found that, "When counties are divided into south and non-south sub-samples, the results are also consistent: a cracker=black redneck culture effect is evident for both racial groups in the south, and is also apparent outside of the southern region."
