= Late talker =

Toddler with delayed language development

Late language emergence
- Other names: Late talker
- Specialty: Developmental psychology
- Treatment: Language interventions (general language stimulation, focused language stimulation, Milieu teaching)
- Frequency: ~13% of two-year-olds

A late talker is a toddler experiencing late language emergence (LLE), which can also be an early or secondary sign of an autism spectrum disorder, or other neurodevelopmental disorders such as fetal alcohol spectrum disorder, attention deficit hyperactivity disorder, intellectual disability, learning disability, hyperlexia, social communication disorder, or specific language impairment. Lack of language development, comprehension skills, and challenges with literacy skills are potential risks as late talkers age. Outlook for late talkers with or without intervention is generally favorable. Toddlers have a high probability of catching up to typical toddlers if early language interventions are put in place.

== Language development ==
=== Expected language emergence ===
Toddlers aged 1–2 years begin to use and comprehend different types of words. Initially, the most prominent types are nouns, and eventually they move on to other word types such as verbs and adjectives. Once toddlers have said their first word, they begin to acquire new words at a rate of roughly one per week. Words are related to things in the toddler's environment, such as body parts, toys, clothes, etc. They often use one word to mean many different things; for example, they may call all types of transport "car".

Around the 15-month mark, toddlers know six words on average, and begin to notice and wonder about things that are a little outside of their environments. Once they reach 18 months, they refer to themselves by their name and eventually start using the pronoun I. During this stage, they also repeat parts of sentences they hear. As they get close to 2 years, toddlers start putting two words together. They begin to learn the use of "no" and ask adults to tell them the name of people and new objects. On average, a 2-year-old knows 50 words and then begins to learn new words at a rate around one per day. From 2 to 3 years of age, their vocabularies grow rapidly. At 30 months old, they are expected to know around 200 words and by 3 are able to participate in very simple conversations.

=== Late talker's language emergence ===
Late language emergence (LLE) occurs when toddlers do not produce or comprehend language at the expected rate for their age. About 13% of two-year-olds experience a delay in language emergence. Late talkers differ from toddlers with developmental language disorder (DLD) and disabilities in the sense that their only characteristic is that they experience limited expressive vocabulary for their age, as opposed to a lack of receptive language or cognitive abilities. LLE can be an indicator of other kinds of disorders or disabilities. If late talkers are not catching up to typical talkers by the age of 4, they could have specific language impairment. Expressive language screening between the ages of 18 and 35 months helps determine if LLE is "secondary to autism spectrum disorder, intellectual disability, hearing impairment, receptive language delay, or demographic risk".

When compared to typical talkers, 24-month-old late talkers do not seem to struggle with verbs and their formation, which are an important part of one's grammatical development. They struggle with nouns more than a typical talker and have difficulty combining words. Late talkers perform lower than typical talkers in cognitive functioning and receptive language skills.

== Characteristics ==
Toddlers are at risk of being a late talker if:

- They produced abnormal babbling from 9 to 21 months of age.
- By 15 months, they are not producing six or more words.
- By 18 months, they do not appear to comprehend more words than they can produce.
- At 18 months old, they are using less than 20 words and lack knowledge of different word types.
- At 24 months old, they are using less than 50 words and are not combining words from different word classes.
- After producing their first word, they demonstrate a lack of "complex syllable structures, lower percentage of consonants correct, and smaller consonant and vowel inventories".
- They show a lack of comprehension and insist on communicating using gestures.
- Between 2 and 3 years of age, they are using short sentences with very simple grammar.

== Diagnosis ==
LLE could be a sign of other types of language disorders or intellectual disabilities, so a risk exists of misdiagnosing a child as just being a late talker. This symptom may be secondary to problems with their vocal tract or hearing, autism, neglect, or abuse. For toddlers to be diagnosed as late talkers, they need to see a doctor and a speech pathologist. A doctor will conduct a full medical examination and a speech pathologist will do a full screening and comprehensive assessment. The Language Development Survey (LDS) is a prevalent screening method used on toddlers aged 18–35 months of age. This tests whether a child's expressive vocabulary and syntax are developing in a standard way. The LDS consists of a parent or caregiver of the child to report on the child's language development in regards to word combination. This screening takes a total of 10 minutes. It also takes risk factors into consideration, such as the child's demographic and history. This test, combined with other forms of assessment, determine whether children are late talkers, or if their language delay is associated with another type of language disorder or intellectual disability.

=== Types of assessment ===
Assessments are carried out to determine the speech and language ability of a child. A speech pathologist works with the parent or caregiver of the child to decide on the most appropriate assessment.

==== Ethnographic interviewing ====
Ethnographic interviewing, a style of assessment, consists of one-on-one interviews between the assessor and assessed. It requires the assessor to ask the child open-ended questions to find information about the child's environment.

==== Language sampling ====
Language sampling is used to obtain random samples of a child's language during play, conversation, or narration. Language sampling must be used with standardized assessments to compare and diagnose a child as a late talker.

==== Dynamic assessment ====
Dynamic assessment involves testing, teaching, and retesting a child. Firstly, the child's knowledge is tested. Then, the child is taught a word. Finally, the child is retested to see if he has learnt the target language. This type of assessment is useful in determining whether a child is a late talker or if his language delay is a factor of another kind of disorder.

==== Standardised assessments ====
===== Norm-referenced test =====
A norm-referenced test consists of comparing and ranking a child's scores to others. This allows a child's results to be compared to a statistical standard. A child can be at risk of being a late talker if his test results are on the lower end of the scale compared to other test takers.

===== Criterion-referenced test =====
A criterion-referenced test consists of comparing a child's scores to a preset standard. A child's scores are taken and analysed to see if they meet the criteria of a typically developing child. This test can be carried out formally or informally.

==== Observation techniques ====
===== Analog tasks =====
Analog tasks consist of the assessor observing the child participate in play in a staged environment that simulates a real-world situation. The assessor can take note of the child's behaviour and language performance, and use it to diagnose the child.

===== Naturalistic observation =====
Naturalistic observation involves observing a child's interaction with others in a trivial social setting. It is often used with criterion-referenced assessments to diagnose a child.

===== Systematic observation and contextual analysis =====
Systematic observation and contextual analysis consist of observing the child in a mixture of contexts. The child is observed while doing a task, playing, or interacting with others. Conclusions are then drawn of his language function, and problems are identified if present.

=== Culture and assessment ===
When choosing tests and assessments for a child, culture is taken in to consideration. The assessments carried out on the child needs to be appropriate for the child's cultural setting. Tests cannot be translated, as this affects the data and can result in a child being misdiagnosed. For children who speak more than one language, assessments must cater to that. A standardized test is not enough to diagnose a child who is bilingual. Bilingual children need to be assessed using a combination of ethnographic interviewing, language sampling, dynamic assessment, standardised tests, and observation techniques to be accurately diagnosed as a late talker.

== Treatment ==
The earlier interventions are put in place to help a toddler overcome LLE, the better the outcome. Language interventions (with the help of speech pathologists) are needed, so late talkers eventually catch up. Some common approaches are monitoring and indirect and direct language stimulation.

Late talkers struggle with learning vocabulary and phonological acquisition. Targeting vocabulary and increasing their vocabulary bank simultaneously improves their phonological development.

When deciding which approach to take in treating a toddler, cultural background should be taken into consideration. Some types of intervention may work for some cultures, but may not work nor be appropriate for others.

=== Language intervention ===
Late talkers can be treated with a variety of language intervention methods. The earlier a child is diagnosed and treated, the better his language skills will develop while growing up.

==== General language stimulation ====
General language stimulation involves providing the child with an environment that is full of language stimulation. This includes giving the child the opportunity to participate in reading books, playing, cooking, and other everyday activities in which the child is interested. The key to this intervention is to follow the late talker's lead. Once a child is interested in a specific object, the parent or caregiver then takes part in parallel talk, that is, talking about the object rather than directly modeling the word. The parent or caregiver is then required to repeat the child's utterance, regardless of how incorrect it is, and complement this with semantic and grammatical detail.

==== Focused language stimulation ====
Focused language stimulation requires the parent or caregiver to have a list of goal words for the child to learn and produce. The average number of target words is 10, but this varies from child to child. The parent or caregiver must allow the child to be exposed to the target language as much as possible. The adult has to produce the target language in a meaningful and functional context, such as in a sentence or question form. The child is then prompted (not instructed) to repeat the target word. If the target word is produced incorrectly, the parent follows with a recast. Once the child has learnt these words, the adult replaces these with new ones and the process is repeated.

==== Milieu teaching ====
Milieu teaching involves changing the child's environment to give them as many opportunities to talk and produce the target language. In this intervention method, having a set of language goals for the child to achieve is necessary. Incorrect production of target language follows by the adult modeling the word for the child to imitate. Correct production of target language follows by the adult providing a recast.

=== Culture and treatment ===
Culture diversity is a considerable factor in choosing the right type of intervention for a child. Speech pathologist are responsible for choosing a treatment that is culturally appropriate for the child and his family. Treatments such as general language stimulation, focused language stimulation, and milieu teaching are designed appropriately to meet the needs of the majority in the United States. These methods are adapted to meet the needs of other cultures in the community for the child to have a higher success rate.

The nature and context of social interactions is observed when modifying a standard treatment to meet the norms of a child's culture and background. For example, in some cultures, parents may not be commonly involved in play with their child. The treatment is then adapted for other family members (siblings, cousins, other peers) to deliver the intervention. The location where these treatments are usually provided is the family home. In many cultures, this is seen as unacceptable. Treatments for these kinds of situations are modified, and options, such as schools, are considered as a place to undertake treatment.

== Outcomes ==
Once late talkers enter kindergarten, most begin to catch up and present language ability within the typical talker range. Late talkers tend to demonstrate poorer language ability and be at the lower end of the normal range than typical talkers. Late talkers exhibit considerably lower scorers on language measures than typical talkers once they reach adolescence. Around 50 to 70% of children who experience LLE reach normal language level by the time they enter school. Their chances of successfully catching up decrease when language delay is still present by the time they are 3 years old. This is only the case for 5–8% of preschool children.

=== Einstein syndrome ===
"Einstein syndrome" is a term coined by economist Thomas Sowell in his 2001 book The Einstein Syndrome: Bright Children Who Talk Late to describe a subset of late talkers who demonstrate advanced abilities in analytical, mathematical, or musical domains despite delayed speech. The term references physicist Albert Einstein, who reportedly did not speak in complete sentences until age five.

Sowell collaborated with speech-language pathologist Stephen Camarata of Vanderbilt University to study this population. Camarata's research found that while approximately 10% of toddlers are late talkers, only a small percentage have autism spectrum disorder, suggesting that late talking alone should not be considered diagnostic of autism. Characteristics associated with Einstein syndrome include exceptional visual-spatial reasoning, selective interests, strong-willed behavior, and a family history of relatives in analytical occupations such as engineering.

Einstein syndrome is not a formal medical diagnosis and does not appear in the DSM-5. In a 2002 review in the Journal of Autism and Developmental Disorders, neurologist Isabelle Rapin described Sowell's "Einstein children" as "rare, extraordinarily gifted children" and acknowledged that providing a definite prognosis in very young children "is hazardous because it is so subject to error." However, some researchers have cautioned that the concept relies substantially on anecdotal evidence and that discouraging professional evaluation could negatively impact children who would benefit from early intervention.

== See also ==
- Speech delay
- Nonverbal autism
