= Knowledge and Decisions =

1980 book by Thomas Sowell

- First edition
- Author: Thomas Sowell
- Language: English
- Publisher: Basic Books
- Publication date: 1980
- Publication place: United States
- Media type: Print
- Pages: 422 (hardcover)
- ISBN: 978-0465037360
- OCLC: 35768274
- Dewey Decimal: 302.3 21
- LC Class: HM73 .S69 1996
- Preceded by: Race and Economics

Knowledge and Decisions is a non-fiction book by American economist Thomas Sowell. The book was initially published in 1980 by Basic Books and reissued in 1996. Sowell analyzes social and economic knowledge and how it is transmitted through society, and how that transmission affects decision making. The book's central theme of dispersed knowledge is drawn from F.A. Hayek's article "The Use of Knowledge in Society." Hayek said that this book expanded admirably on his original concepts and made them clear to lay readers, with examples of economic activity drawn from the real world.

Sowell rejects the tendency to put economic and political decisions and their results in moral terms. Doing so, he argues, ignores the tradeoffs and limitations inherent in every economic system and society. Consistent with his established laissez-faire viewpoints, Sowell also indicts price controls (such as rent control, minimum wage, price fixing, and subsidies) as interfering in the implicit communication between consumers and producers necessary to optimize the choices of each. The fact that some industries or government agencies seem particularly incompetent or corrupt over many turnovers of their staff, he argues, is not bad people performing the duties, but of rational people acting in their own interests responding to whatever incentives have been established in the system.

The last section of the book deals with intellectuals, those whose profession is the distribution of ideas. Sowell questions the popular unwavering faith in the expert intellectual and "articulated rationality" for "solutions" to economic or political problems. He explains that through intellectuals, government agencies, such as the United States Environmental Protection Agency and National Institutes of Health, have become more numerous and more powerful. Sowell explains that agencies make more laws than Congress does, but the agencies are insulated from any sort of consequences of their decisions because the officials are not elected. That has the effect of creating a larger divide between people who make decisions and those who experience the consequences.

Sowell also talks about the recurrent unintended consequences of many intellectual decisions. Consequently, Sowell advocates decentralized decision making by allowing people to make economic choices for themselves rather than assuming that non-elected intellectuals at centralized planning agencies will make better decisions.

== See also ==
- Adam Smith
- Government agency
- Information Rules (book)
- Supply and demand
