= Intellectuals and Society =

2010 book by Thomas Sowell

- Cover of the hardcover edition
- Author: Thomas Sowell
- Language: English
- Subjects: Sociology, social philosophy
- Publisher: Basic Books
- Publication date: January 5, 2010
- Publication place: United States
- Media type: Print eBook audiobook
- Pages: 416
- ISBN: 0-465-01948-X
- Preceded by: The Housing Boom and Bust

Intellectuals and Society is a non-fiction book by Thomas Sowell. The book was initially published on January 5, 2010, by Basic Books.

Intellectuals are defined as "idea workers" who exercise profound influence on policy makers and public opinion, but are often not directly accountable for the results. Intellectuals and Society examines the record of these idea workers and the conditions, methods and incentives driving their points of view that, according to Sowell, have often resulted in disaster for societies where intellectuals have been allowed "undue influence".

== Undue influence of intellectuals ==
Sowell explained undue influence of intellectuals as follows:

"Those whose careers are built on the creation and dissemination of ideas — the intellectuals — have played a role in many societies out of all proportion to their numbers. Whether that role has, on balance, made those around them better off or worse off is one of the key questions of our times.

The quick answer is that intellectuals have done both. But certainly, during the 20th century, it is hard to escape the conclusion that intellectuals have on balance made the world a worse and more dangerous place. Scarcely a mass-murdering dictator of the 20th century was without his supporters, admirers, or apologists among the leading intellectuals — not only within his own country, but in foreign democracies, where intellectuals were free to say whatever they wanted.

...intellectuals are people whose end products are intangible ideas, and they are usually judged by whether those ideas sound good to other intellectuals or resonate with the public. Whether their ideas turn out to work — whether they make life better or worse for others — is another question entirely."

== Summary ==
Sowell argues that intellectuals, whom he defines as people whose occupations deal primarily with ideas (writers, historians, academics, etc.), usually consider themselves as "anointed", or as endowed with superior intellect or insight with which to guide the masses and those who have authority over them. Sowell contends that several characteristics mark such intellectuals.

=== Working with ideas ===
An intellectual's work begins and ends with ideas, not the practical application of ideas to real world problems. These purveyors of ideas may be at all points of the political and ideological spectrum, although Sowell generally reserves his sharpest criticisms for those on the left. Certain common patterns in intellectuals, he argues, cut across specific political ideologies. He argues that intellectuals like to work outside the established power structures and apply what is presumed to be superior insight in order to control the resources and decision-making processes of the masses and their official leaders. For example, both National Socialism and Stalinism attempted to micro-manage the lives of their citizens; both implemented sweeping propaganda campaigns to reframe reality, and both resulted in leadership by an elite outside group.

=== Lack of real accountability ===
The work of intellectuals is ultimately not subject to external (real world) verifiability, as compared to those engaged in more practical pursuits with readily observable results. An intellectual, for example, can condemn a military operation for "excessive force" but has no accountability in regards to the actual outcome of that operation. By contrast, a military commander who fails to deploy sufficient force at the appropriate time can pay with his own life and that of his men. The acclaim given to intellectuals, despite their predictions having failed, is a prime example of the lack of ultimate accountability, Sowell maintains.

=== Narrow and specialized knowledge ===
Intellectuals usually have thorough knowledge in their areas of expertise. Outside these fields, however, they may be as uninformed as the average person. Too often, Sowell argues, this does not stop them from attempting to influence public opinion in areas where they are not fully qualified. Sowell lists several examples that he argues support his thesis.

=== Intellectual climate of distortion and misinformation ===
Sowell states that intellectuals often assume that their specialized knowledge qualifies them to guide others, as do experts in any field of endeavor, practical or otherwise. Sowell argues that what is crucial is their influence on the people who wield decision-making power. The presumption of insight often creates a climate that influences the way events are reported by the media, and may make politicians hesitant to take certain approaches to problem-solving. Before World War II, for example, British intellectuals played a large role in the process of creating the opposition to re-armament, which proved to be a deadly mistake.

=== Verbal virtuosity (rhetoric) versus evidence or logic ===
Sowell suggests that intellectuals rely heavily on what he calls "verbal virtuosity" (clever phrasing, vague euphemisms, witty quotes, deceptive labeling, name-calling and sneering asides) to substitute for evidence, logic and analysis. Other tactics of "verbal virtuosity" include dismissing opposing ideas as simplistic, portraying those making opposing arguments as morally unworthy, invoking "rights" which have no legal basis, vague calls for "change", reliance on the abstract versus the concrete, and a constant "filtering of reality".

=== Ego-involvement and personalization ===
The presumption of wisdom and/or virtue causes intellectuals to personalize situations where contending ideas are involved. This often results in: (a) the demonization of opponents, and (b) personal fulfillment serving as a substitute for debate and evidence. Sowell does not make it clear if intellectuals acquired these traits from politicians, or the other way around.

== Reception ==
In 2010, American libertarian philosopher David Gordon wrote a positive review of the book for the Independent Institute. He states that Sowell has written an excellent book as a whole.

In 2012, Aidan Byrne, from the School of Humanities at the University of Wolverhampton wrote a negative review of the book for LSE Review of Books. Unaware of Sowell's race, Byrne wrote within the review: "To him, slavery's cultural legacy means that it shouldn't be considered a moral problem, nor should amelioration be attempted: easy for a rich white man to say." In 2020, Byrne's review was removed from the LSE Review of Books website with a message declaring that the review "did not meet the minimum standard for publication and has consequently been removed."

== See also ==
- The Vision of the Anointed

== Related reading ==
- Raymond Aron, The Opium of the Intellectuals, Transaction (2001) ISBN 0-7658-0700-9
- Julien Benda, The Treason of the Intellectuals, Transaction (2006) ISBN 1-4128-0623-2
- Edward W. Said, Representations of the Intellectual, Vintage (1996) ISBN 0-679-76127-6
- Florian Znaniecki, The Social Role of the Man of Knowledge, Harper Torchbooks (1968) ISBN 0-06-131372-6
