= Intellectual =

Person who engages in critical thinking and reasoning

An intellectual is a person who engages in critical thinking, research, and reflection about the nature of reality, especially the nature of society and proposed solutions for its normative problems. Coming from the world of culture, either as a creator or as a mediator, the intellectual participates in politics, either to defend a concrete proposition or to denounce an injustice, usually by either rejecting, producing or extending an ideology, and by defending a system of values.

== Etymological background ==
=== "Man of letters" ===
The term "man of letters" derives from the French term belletrist or homme de lettres but is not synonymous with "an academic". A "man of letters" was a literate man, able to read and write, and thus highly valued in the upper strata of society in a time when literacy was rare. In the 17th and 18th centuries, the term Belletrist(s) came to be applied to the literati: the French participants in—sometimes referred to as "citizens" of—the Republic of Letters, which evolved into the salon, a social institution, usually run by a hostess, meant for the edification, education, and cultural refinement of the participants.

In the late 19th century, when literacy was relatively common in European countries such as the United Kingdom, the "Man of Letters" (littérateur) denotation broadened to mean "specialized", a man who earned his living writing intellectually (not creatively) about literature: the essayist, the journalist, the critic, et al. Examples include Samuel Johnson, Walter Scott and Thomas Carlyle. In the 20th century, such an approach was gradually superseded by the academic method, and the term "Man of Letters" became disused, replaced by the generic term "intellectual", describing the intellectual person. The archaic term is the basis of the names of several academic institutions which call themselves Colleges of Letters and Science.

=== "Intellectual" ===
The earliest record of the English noun "intellectual" is found in the 19th century, where in 1813, Byron reports that 'I wish I may be well enough to listen to these intellectuals'. Over the course of the 19th century, other variants of the already established adjective 'intellectual' as a noun appeared in English and in French, where in the 1890s the noun (intellectuels) formed from the adjective intellectuel appeared with higher frequency in the literature. Collini writes about this time that "[a]mong this cluster of linguistic experiments there occurred ... the occasional usage of 'intellectuals' as a plural noun to refer, usually with a figurative or ironic intent, to a collection of people who might be identified in terms of their intellectual inclinations or pretensions."

In early 19th-century Britain, Samuel Taylor Coleridge coined the term clerisy, the intellectual class responsible for upholding and maintaining the national culture, the secular equivalent of the Anglican clergy. Likewise, in Tsarist Russia, there arose the intelligentsia (1860s–1870s), who were the status class of white-collar workers. For Germany, the theologian Alister McGrath said that "the emergence of a socially alienated, theologically literate, antiestablishment lay intelligentsia is one of the more significant phenomena of the social history of Germany in the 1830s". An intellectual class in Europe was socially important, especially to self-styled intellectuals, whose participation in society's arts, politics, journalism, and education—of either nationalist, internationalist, or ethnic sentiment—constitute "vocation of the intellectual". Moreover, some intellectuals were anti-academic, despite universities (the academy) being synonymous with intellectualism.

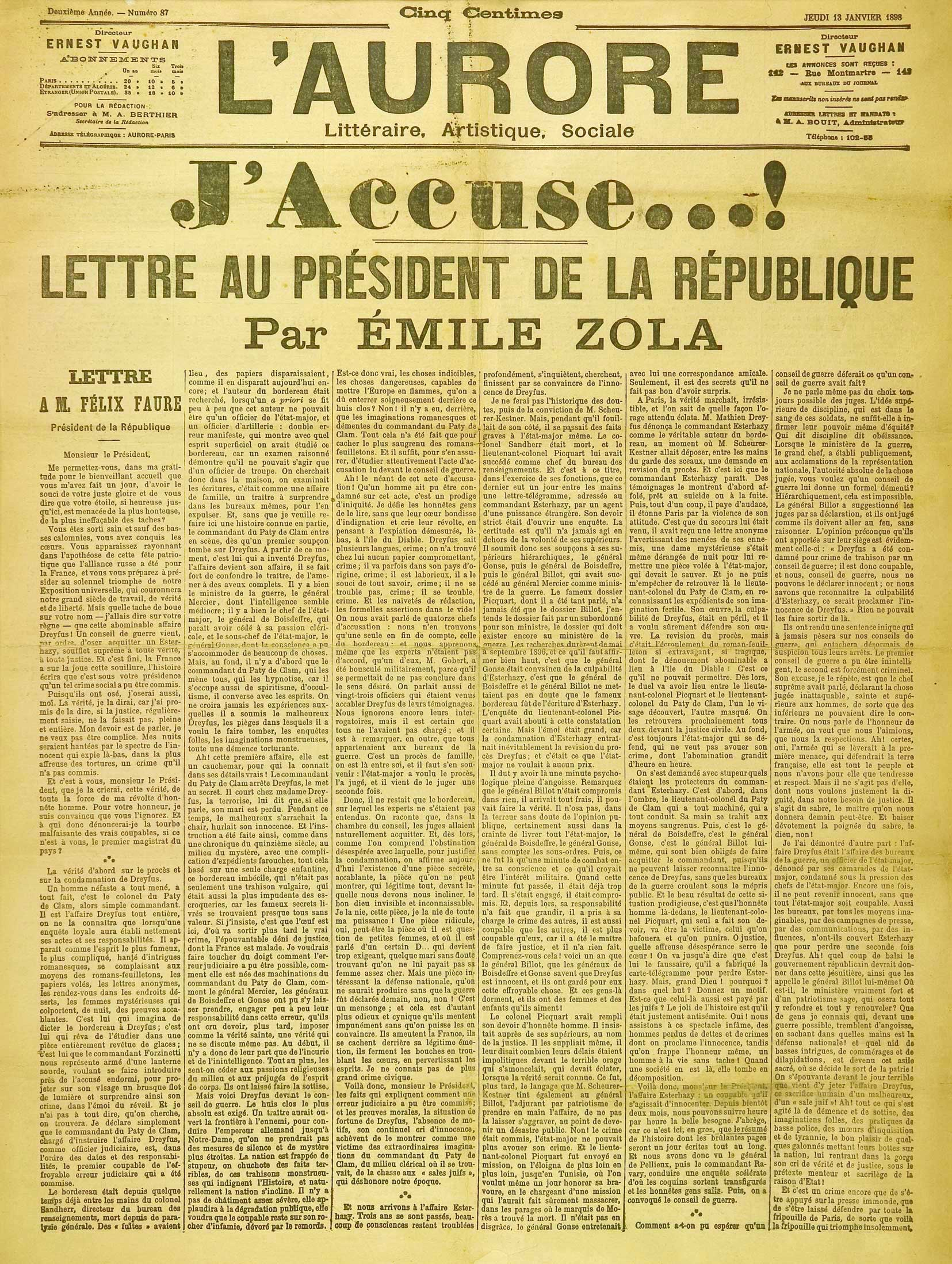
The front page of L'Aurore (13 January 1898) featured Émile Zola's open letter J'Accuse…! asking the French President Félix Faure to resolve the Dreyfus affair.

In France, the Dreyfus affair (1894–1906), an identity crisis of antisemitic nationalism for the French Third Republic (1870–1940), marked the full emergence of the "intellectual in public life", especially Émile Zola, Octave Mirbeau and Anatole France directly addressing the matter of French antisemitism to the public; thenceforward, "intellectual" became common, yet initially derogatory, usage; its French noun usage is attributed to Georges Clemenceau in 1898. Nevertheless, by 1930 the term "intellectual" passed from its earlier pejorative associations and restricted usages to a widely accepted term and it was because of the Dreyfus Affair that the term also acquired generally accepted use in English.

In the 20th century, the term intellectual acquired positive connotations of social prestige, derived from possessing intellect and intelligence, especially when the intellectual's activities exerted positive consequences in the public sphere and so increased the intellectual understanding of the public, by means of moral responsibility, altruism, and solidarity, without resorting to the manipulations of demagoguery, paternalism and incivility (condescension). The sociologist Frank Furedi said that "Intellectuals are not defined according to the jobs they do, but [by] the manner in which they act, the way they see themselves, and the [social and political] values that they uphold.

According to Thomas Sowell, as a descriptive term of person, personality, and profession, the word intellectual identifies three traits:

1. Educated; erudition for developing theories;
2. Productive; creates cultural capital in the fields of philosophy, literary criticism, and sociology, law, medicine, and science, etc.; and
3. Artistic; creates art in literature, music, painting, sculpture, etc.

== Historical uses ==
In Latin, at least starting from the Carolingian Empire, intellectuals could be called litterati, a term which is sometimes applied today.

The word intellectual is found in Indian scripture Mahabharata in the Bachelorette meeting (Swayamvara Sava) of Draupadi. Immediately after Arjuna and Raja-Maharaja (kings-emperors) came to the meeting, Nipuna Buddhijibina (perfect intellectuals) appeared at the meeting.

In Imperial China in the period from 206 BC until AD 1912, the intellectuals were the Scholar-officials ("Scholar-gentlemen"), who were civil servants appointed by the Emperor of China to perform the tasks of daily governance. Such civil servants earned academic degrees by means of imperial examination, and were often also skilled calligraphers or Confucian philosophers. Historian Wing-Tsit Chan concludes that:

Generally speaking, the record of these scholar-gentlemen has been a worthy one. It was good enough to be praised and imitated in 18th century Europe. Nevertheless, it has given China a tremendous handicap in their transition from government by men to government by law, and personal considerations in Chinese government have been a curse.

In Joseon Korea (1392–1897), the intellectuals were the literati, who knew how to read and write, and had been designated, as the chungin (the "middle people"), in accordance with the Confucian system. Socially, they constituted the petite bourgeoisie, composed of scholar-bureaucrats (scholars, professionals, and technicians) who administered the dynastic rule of the Joseon dynasty.

== Public intellectual ==
External videos
- "Role of Intellectuals in Public Life", panel featuring Michael Ignatieff, Russell Jacoby, Roger Kimball, Susie Linfield, Alex Star, Ellen Willis and Alan Wolfe, March 1, 2001, C-SPAN

The term public intellectual describes an intellectual participating in the public-affairs discourse of society in addition to an academic career. Regardless of their academic fields or professional expertise, public intellectuals address and respond to the normative problems of society, and, as such, are expected to be impartial critics who can "rise above the partial preoccupation of one's own profession—and engage with the global issues of truth, judgment, and taste of the time". In Representations of the Intellectual (1994), Edward Saïd said that the "true intellectual is, therefore, always an outsider, living in self-imposed exile, and on the margins of society". Public intellectuals usually arise from the educated elite of a society, although the North American usage of the term intellectual includes the university academics. The difference between intellectual and academic is participation in the realm of public affairs.

Jürgen Habermas' The Structural Transformation of the Public Sphere (1963) made significant contribution to the notion of public intellectual by historically and conceptually delineating the idea of private and public. Controversial, in the same year, was Ralf Dahrendorf's definition: "As the court-jesters of modern society, all intellectuals have the duty to doubt everything that is obvious, to make relative all authority, to ask all those questions that no one else dares to ask".

An intellectual usually is associated with an ideology or with a philosophy. The Czech intellectual Václav Havel said that politics and intellectuals can be linked, but that moral responsibility for the intellectual's ideas, even when advocated by a politician, remains with the intellectual. Therefore, it is best to avoid utopian intellectuals who offer 'universal insights' to resolve the problems of political economy with public policies that might harm and that have harmed civil society; that intellectuals be mindful of the social and cultural ties created with their words, insights and ideas; and should be heard as social critics of politics and power.

=== Public engagement ===
The determining factor for a "thinker" (historian, philosopher, scientist, writer, artist) to be considered a public intellectual is the degree to which the individual is implicated and engaged with the vital reality of the contemporary world, i.e. participation in the public affairs of society. Consequently, being designated as a public intellectual is determined by the degree of influence of the designator's motivations, opinions, and options of action (social, political, ideological), and by affinity with the given thinker.

After the failure of the large-scale May 68 movement in France, intellectuals within the country were often maligned for having specific areas of expertise while discussing general subjects like democracy. Intellectuals increasingly claimed to be within marginalized groups rather than their spokespeople, and centered their activism on the social problems relevant to their areas of expertise (such as gender relations in the case of psychologists). A similar shift occurred in China after the Tiananmen Square Massacre from the "universal intellectual" (who plans better futures from within academia) to minjian ("grassroots") intellectuals, the latter group represented by such figures as Wang Xiaobo, social scientist Yu Jianrong, and Yanhuang Chunqiu editor Ding Dong (丁東).

=== Public policy ===
In the matters of public policy, the public intellectual connects scholarly research to the practical matters of solving societal problems. The British sociologist Michael Burawoy, an exponent of public sociology, said that professional sociology has failed by giving insufficient attention to resolving social problems, and that a dialogue between the academic and the layman would bridge the gap. An example is how Chilean intellectuals worked to reestablish democracy within the right-wing, neoliberal governments of the military dictatorship of 1973–1990, the Pinochet régime allowed professional opportunities for some liberal and left-wing social scientists to work as politicians and as consultants in effort to realize the theoretical economics of the Chicago Boys, but their access to power was contingent upon political pragmatism, abandoning the political neutrality of the academic intellectual.

In The Sociological Imagination (1959), C. Wright Mills said that academics had become ill-equipped for participating in public discourse, and that journalists usually are "more politically alert and knowledgeable than sociologists, economists, and especially ... political scientists". That, because the universities of the U.S. are bureaucratic, private businesses, they "do not teach critical reasoning to the student", who then does not know "how to gauge what is going on in the general struggle for power in modern society". Likewise, Richard Rorty criticized the quality of participation of intellectuals in public discourse as an example of the "civic irresponsibility of intellect, especially academic intellect".

External videos
- Booknotes interview with Posner on Public Intellectuals: A Study of Decline, June 2, 2002, C-SPAN

The American legal scholar Richard Posner said that the participation of academic public intellectuals in the public life of society is characterized by logically untidy and politically biased statements of the kind that would be unacceptable to academia. He concluded that there are few ideologically and politically independent public intellectuals, and disapproved public intellectuals who limit themselves to practical matters of public policy, and not with values or public philosophy, or public ethics, or public theology, nor with matters of moral and spiritual outrage.

== Intellectual status class ==
Socially, intellectuals constitute the intelligentsia, a status class organised either by ideology (e.g., conservatism, fascism, socialism, liberalism, reactionary, revolutionary, democratic, communism), or by nationality (American intellectuals, French intellectuals, Ibero–American intellectuals, et al.). The term intelligentsiya originated from Tsarist Russia (c. 1860s–1870s), where it denotes the social stratum of those possessing intellectual formation (schooling, education), and who were Russian society's counterpart to the German Bildungsbürgertum and to the French bourgeoisie éclairée, the enlightened middle classes of those realms.

In Marxist philosophy, the social class function of the intellectuals (the intelligentsia) is to be the source of progressive ideas for the transformation of society: providing advice and counsel to the political leaders, interpreting the country's politics to the mass of the population (urban workers and peasants). In the pamphlet What Is to Be Done? (1902), Vladimir Lenin (1870–1924) said that vanguard-party revolution required the participation of the intellectuals to explain the complexities of socialist ideology to the uneducated proletariat and the urban industrial workers in order to integrate them to the revolution because "the history of all countries shows that the working class, exclusively by its own efforts, is able to develop only trade-union consciousness" and will settle for the limited, socio-economic gains so achieved. In Russia as in Continental Europe, socialist theory was the product of the "educated representatives of the propertied classes", of "revolutionary socialist intellectuals", such as were Karl Marx and Friedrich Engels.

The Hungarian Marxist philosopher György Lukács (1885–1971) identified the intelligentsia as the privileged social class who provide revolutionary leadership. By means of intelligible and accessible interpretation, the intellectuals explain to the workers and peasants the "Who?", the "How?" and the "Why?" of the social, economic and political status quo—the ideological totality of society—and its practical, revolutionary application to the transformation of their society.

The Italian communist theoretician Antonio Gramsci (1891–1937) developed Karl Marx's conception of the intelligentsia to include political leadership in the public sphere. That because "all knowledge is existentially-based", the intellectuals, who create and preserve knowledge, are "spokesmen for different social groups, and articulate particular social interests". That intellectuals occur in each social class and throughout the right-wing, the centre and the left-wing of the political spectrum and that as a social class the "intellectuals view themselves as autonomous from the ruling class" of their society.

Addressing their role as a social class, Jean-Paul Sartre said that intellectuals are the moral conscience of their age; that their moral and ethical responsibilities are to observe the socio-political moment, and to freely speak to their society, in accordance with their consciences.

The British historian Norman Stone said that the intellectual social class misunderstand the reality of society and so are doomed to the errors of logical fallacy, ideological stupidity, and poor planning hampered by ideology. In her memoirs, the Conservative politician Margaret Thatcher wrote that the anti-monarchical French Revolution (1789–1799) was "a utopian attempt to overthrow a traditional order [...] in the name of abstract ideas, formulated by vain intellectuals".

=== Latin America ===
The American academic Peter H. Smith describes the intellectuals of Latin America as people from an identifiable social class, who have been conditioned by that common experience and thus are inclined to share a set of common assumptions (values and ethics); that ninety-four per cent of intellectuals come either from the middle class or from the upper class and that only six per cent come from the working class.

Philosopher Steven Fuller said that because cultural capital confers power and social status as a status group they must be autonomous in order to be credible as intellectuals:

It is relatively easy to demonstrate autonomy, if you come from a wealthy or [an] aristocratic background. You simply need to disown your status and champion the poor and [the] downtrodden [...]. [A]utonomy is much harder to demonstrate if you come from a poor or proletarian background [...], [thus] calls to join the wealthy in common cause appear to betray one's class origins.

=== United States ===
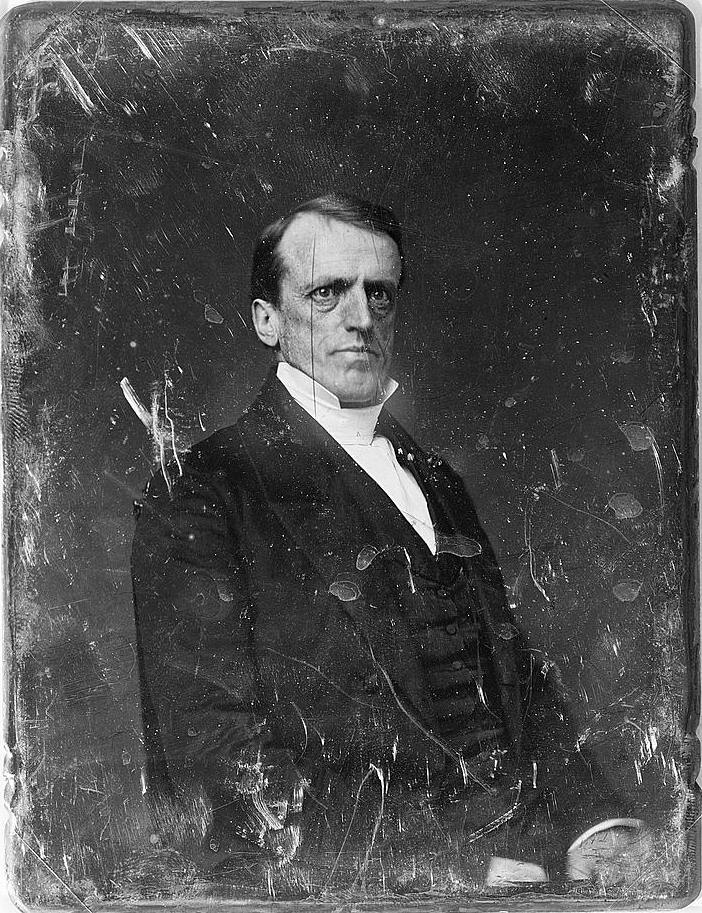
The Congregational theologian Edwards Amasa Park proposed segregating the intellectuals from the public sphere of society in the United States.

The 19th-century U.S. Congregational theologian Edwards Amasa Park said: "We do wrong to our own minds, when we carry out scientific difficulties down to the arena of popular dissension". In his view, it was necessary for the sake of social, economic and political stability "to separate the serious, technical role of professionals from their responsibility [for] supplying usable philosophies for the general public". This expresses a dichotomy, derived from Plato, between public knowledge and private knowledge, "civic culture" and "professional culture", the intellectual sphere of life and the life of ordinary people in society.

In the United States, members of the intellectual status class have been demographically characterized as people who hold liberal-to-leftist political perspectives about guns-or-butter fiscal policy.

In "The Intellectuals and Socialism" (1949), Friedrich Hayek wrote that "journalists, teachers, ministers, lecturers, publicists, radio commentators, writers of fiction, cartoonists, and artists" form an intellectual social class whose function is to communicate the complex and specialized knowledge of the scientist to the general public. He argued that intellectuals were attracted to socialism or social democracy because the socialists offered "broad visions; the spacious comprehension of the social order, as a whole, which a planned system promises" and that such broad-vision philosophies "succeeded in inspiring the imagination of the intellectuals" to change and improve their societies. According to Hayek, intellectuals disproportionately support socialism for idealistic and utopian reasons that cannot be realized in practice.

== Criticism ==
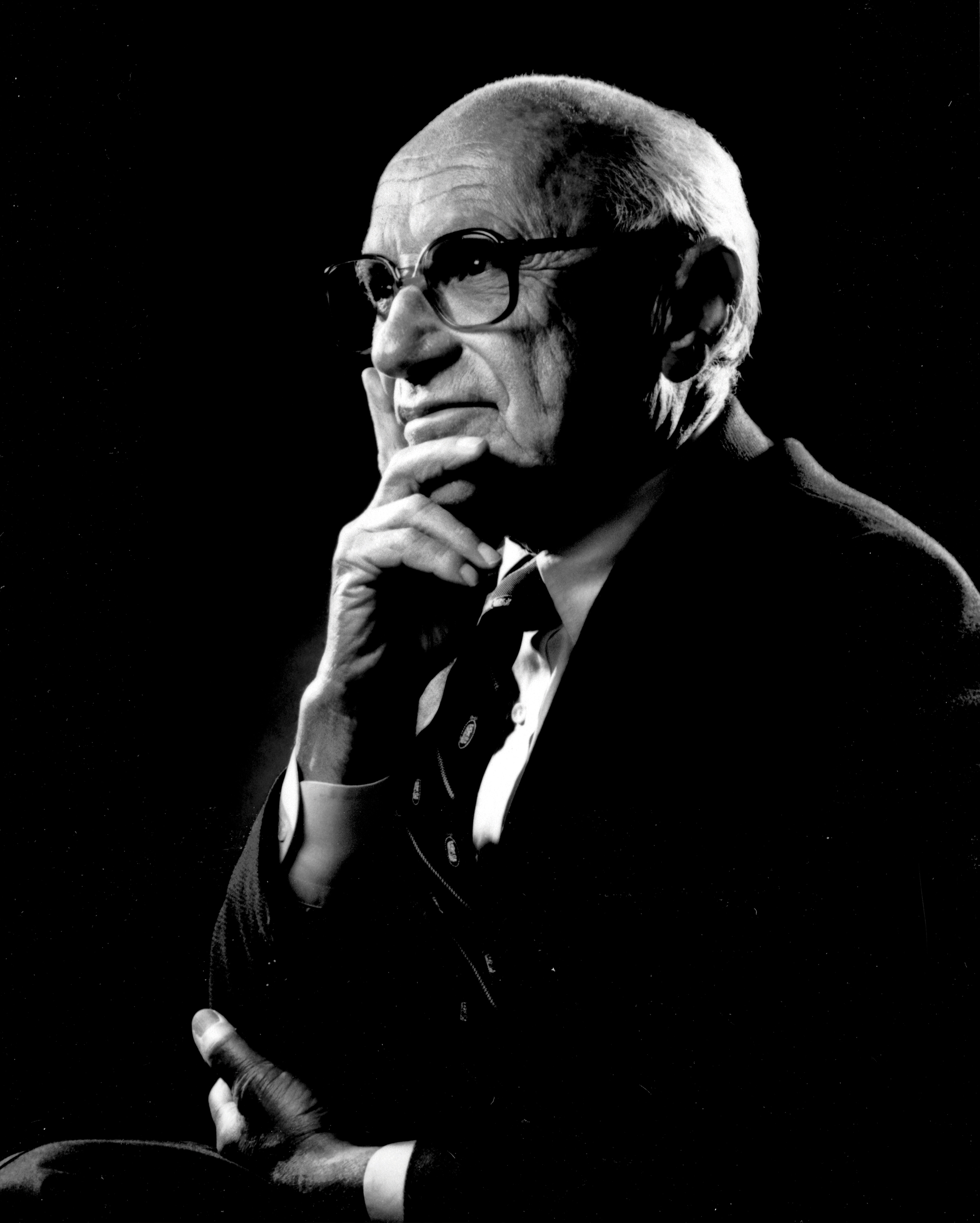
The economist Milton Friedman identified the intelligentsia and the business class as interfering with capitalism.

The French philosopher Jean-Paul Sartre noted that "the Intellectual is someone who meddles in what does not concern them" (L'intellectuel est quelqu'un qui se mêle de ce qui ne le regarde pas).

Noam Chomsky expressed the view that "intellectuals are specialists in defamation, they are basically political commissars, they are the ideological administrators, the most threatened by dissidence." In his 1967 article "The Responsibility of Intellectuals", Chomsky analyzes the intellectual culture in the U.S., and argues that it is largely subservient to power. He is particularly critical of social scientists and technocrats, who provide a pseudo-scientific justification for the crimes of the state.

In "An Interview with Milton Friedman" (1974), the American economist Milton Friedman said that businessmen and intellectuals are enemies of capitalism: most intellectuals believed in socialism while businessmen expected economic privileges. In his essay "Why Do Intellectuals Oppose Capitalism?" (1998), the American libertarian philosopher Robert Nozick of the Cato Institute argued that intellectuals become embittered leftists because their superior intellectual work, much rewarded at school and at university, are undervalued and underpaid in the capitalist market economy. Thus, intellectuals turn against capitalism despite enjoying more socioeconomic status than the average person.

The conservative economist Thomas Sowell wrote in his book Intellectuals and Society (2010) that intellectuals, who are producers of knowledge, not material goods, tend to speak outside their own areas of expertise, and yet expect social and professional benefits from the halo effect derived from possessing professional expertise. In relation to other professions, public intellectuals are socially detached from the negative and unintended consequences of public policy derived from their ideas. Sowell gives the example of Bertrand Russell (1872–1970), who advised the British government against national rearmament in the years before the Second World War.
