= Stuart Jones (economic historian) =

British economic historian (1933–2019)

Frank Stuart Jones (1933-2019) was a British economic historian who spent most of his career at the University of Witwatersrand in South Africa and was a respected authority on the country's economy.

== Selected publications ==
=== Articles ===
- "The imperial banks in South Africa 1861–1914", South African Journal of Economic History, Vol. 11 (1996), No. 2, pp. 21–54. https://doi.org/10.1080/10113439609511084

=== Books ===
- The South African Economy (1992) (With A. L. Muller)
- The Great Imperial Banks in South Africa (1996)
- The Decline of the South African Economy (2002) (Editor)
- The South African Economy in the 1990s (2010) (With Robert Vivian)
