= The Vision of the Anointed =

1995 book by Thomas Sowell

- Cover of the hardcover edition
- Author: Thomas Sowell
- Language: English
- Subject: Social policy
- Publisher: Basic Books
- Publication date: 1995
- Publication place: United States
- Media type: Print (Hardcover and Paperback), Audiobook, E-book)
- Pages: 320
- ISBN: 978-0-465-08995-6
- Preceded by: Race And Culture: A World View
- Followed by: Knowledge and Decisions

The Vision of the Anointed (1995) is a book by economist and political columnist Thomas Sowell which brands people and organizations that he calls "the anointed" as "promoters of a worldview concocted out of fantasy impervious to any real-world considerations". Sowell asserts that these thinkers, writers, and activists continue to be revered even in the face of evidence disproving their positions.

Sowell argues that political thought is dominated by a "prevailing vision" which seals itself off from any empirical evidence that is inconsistent with that vision.

The book challenges people Sowell refers to as "Teflon prophets," who predict that there will be future social, economic, or environmental problems in the absence of government intervention (Ralph Nader is one of his foremost examples).

The book was initially published in 1995 by Basic Books. It was described as a "masterpiece" by Nick Cater.. It was also chosen as Wilfred Reilly’s favorite of Sowell’s (then) 45 original books in his essay in the Dec.’25 National Review, subtitled “What makes Thomas Sowell one of America’s greatest intellects”.
