= Inside American Education =

1993 book by Thomas Sowell

Inside American Education: The Decline, The Deception, The Dogmas
- Author: Thomas Sowell
- Language: English
- Genre: Education
- Publisher: The Free Press
- Publication date: 1993
- Publication place: United States
- Pages: 368
- ISBN: 0029303303
- OCLC: 855170876
- Dewey Decimal: 370.973
- LC Class: LA210 .S65 1993

Inside American Education: The Decline, The Deception, The Dogmas is a book by economist and social theorist Thomas Sowell (hardcover 1993, paperback 2003, Kindle Edition 2010) that details Sowell's assessment of the state of education in the United States (both K-12 education and higher education).

The book received a wide range of reviews, with Forbes and National Review praising it, while academics such as John Brademas questioned aspects of the book concerning multiculturalism and higher education costs.

== Contents ==
Sowell was critical of a number of educational programs and paradigms that became popular in the United States in the 1960s onward such as Man: A Course of Study, values clarification, self-esteem and sex education.

Sowell was critical of schools of education for training the future teachers in educational fads and having low overall standards, and was critical of states requiring people to have credentials from schools of education to take teaching jobs.

Sowell argued that higher educational institutions were full of double standards, including standards that excused violence and disruption when carried out in the name of politically correct goals, but were extremely harsh on small infractions that might be perceived to oppose politically correct goals. Sowell also criticized the decision of Stanford University president Donald Kennedy to expel China scholar Steven W. Mosher from the Ph.D. program, alleging: "Not one stated requirement for the doctorate in anthropology was even claimed to have been violated...Instead, criteria of personal behavior were created ex post. Regarding higher education, Sowell criticizes the practice at large universities of designating undergraduate instruction to graduate assistants.

== Reception ==
Sowell appeared on The Diane Rehm Show on January 13, 1993 to discuss the book.

Chester E. Finn Jr., a former United States Assistant Secretary of Education under William Bennett, praised the book in a review for National Review as "a clear, hard-hitting, amply documented work that manages to be strong without being shrill, sensible yet not narrow-minded, outraged but not outrageous." For Forbes, James W. Michaels called Sowell "an American Emile Zola, accusing the smug American educational leadership of hypocrisy, anti-intellectualism, avarice and propagandizing for essentially left-wing causes...in a factual, analytic style."

A review in Arts Education Policy Review called the book "a penetrating and comprehensive criticism of the educational establishment. Amidst the turbidity of educational debate, it provides a bracing splash of cold reason...The book is an excellent resource for policy discussions and development and offers provocative analysis of the many ills besetting education. Sowell adeptly dismantles many of the familiar arguments for multiculturalism, racial quotas, values clarification, various administrative policies, and other educational practices, and in so doing, he exposes the deceptions and dogmas that have insulated these practices from accountability."

John Brademas, a former Democratic Party member of the United States House of Representatives and president of New York University, offered a critical review in The New York Times: "Some of Mr. Sowell's attacks are on target, but his generalizations are so extravagant and his tone so self-righteous and bombastic that he undermines his case." Brademas added that the book "offers little constructive counsel" on dealing with the issues surrounding education in the United States.

John Silber, then president of Boston University, found the book to have "strengths" and "occasional weaknesses" and likened Sowell's perspective to that of a "military historian, not as a battlefield correspondent". Silber concluded that the book "identifies the obstacles keeping the American people from achieving an excellent system of education as political" while finding that it "too easily discounts our cultural difficulties".

Publishers Weekly called some critiques in this book regarding athletic scholarships and publish or perish "well reasoned" but added that Sowell "often goes wildly askew, as when he argues that sex education causes teen pregnancy."

The Journal of Blacks in Higher Education had a critical review by journalist David Hatchett, finding "a tendency to see complicated problems in narrow, simplistic terms" while praising the chapters about "economics irregularities in the country's network of elite universities". Regarding Sowell's critique of federal financial aid disincentivizing private universities from limiting costs, Hatchett counters that most college students attend public universities and lack access to financial aid. Furthermore, Hatchett was most critical of the book's views on public K-12 education, for instance opposition to multiculturalism and sex education: "Schools are not just bureaucratic islands isolated from the mainstream of U.S. society. They...are products of the values and social currents of the society that produced them."
