= Thomas Sowell =

American economist (born 1930)

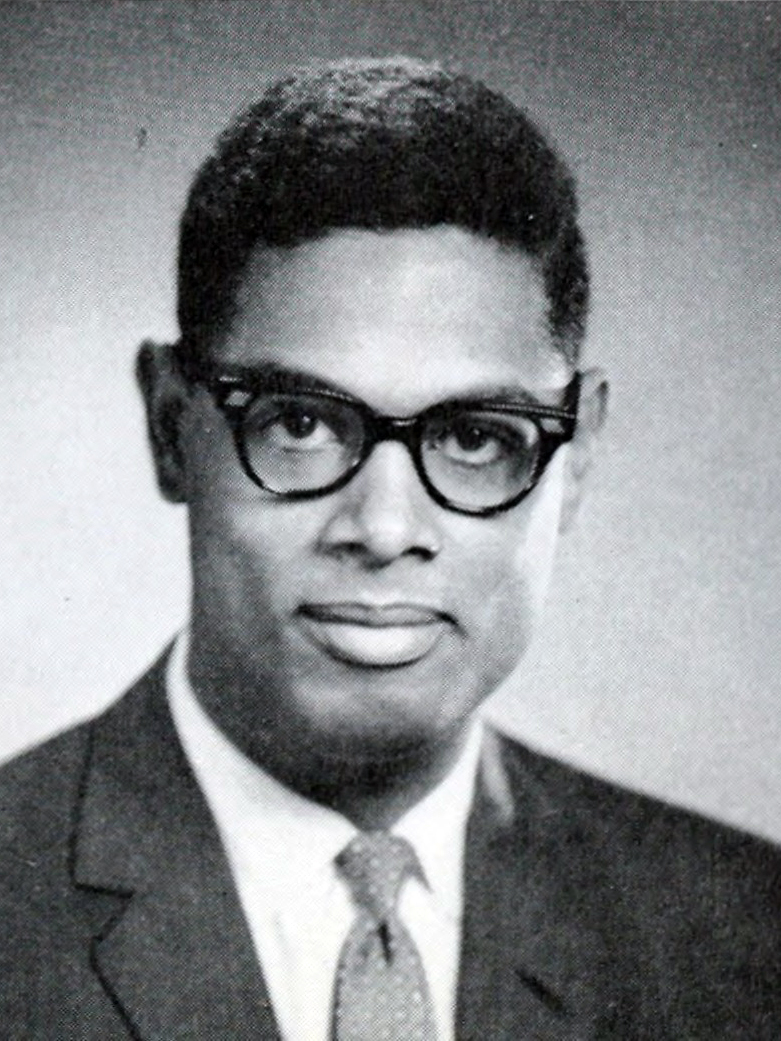
- Sowell in 1964
- Born: June 30, 1930 (age 96); Gastonia, North Carolina, U.S.
- Political party: Democratic (until 1972); Independent (after 1972)
- Spouses: Alma Parr (m. 1964; div. 1975) Mary Ash (m. 1981)
- Children: 2

Academic background
- Education: Harvard University (BA); Columbia University (MA); University of Chicago (PhD)
- Doctoral advisor: George Stigler
- Influences: Smith; Marx; Keynes; Hayek; Friedman; Stigler; Brown

Academic work
- Discipline: Economic history; Welfare economics; Economic development; Sociology; Political sociology; Education; Higher education; History; Intellectual history; African-American history; Discrimination; Race relations; Historical linguistics
- School or tradition: Chicago school of economics
- Institutions: U.S. Department of Labor (1961–1962); Rutgers University (1962–1963); Howard University (1963–1964); Cornell University (1965–1969); University of Chicago (1967–1968); Brandeis University (1969–1970); University of California, Los Angeles (1970–1980); Urban Institute (1972–1974); American Enterprise Institute (1975–1976); Stanford University; Center for Advanced Study in the Behavioral Sciences (1976–1977) (Note: CASBS formally became part of Stanford University in 2008.); Hoover Institution (1977–present) (Note: Sowell was first a member of the Hoover Institution as a fellow in April 1977. He became a Senior fellow in September 1980.); Amherst College (1977–1978)
- Notable ideas: Knowledge and Decisions (1980); A Conflict of Visions (1987); Inside American Education (1993); The Vision of the Anointed (1995); Basic Economics (2000); Applied Economics: Thinking Beyond Stage One (2003); Affirmative Action Around the World (2004); Black Rednecks and White Liberals (2005); Intellectuals and Society (2009); The Housing Boom and Bust (2010); Wealth, Poverty and Politics (2015); Charter Schools and Their Enemies (2020); Historical analysis of Say's law; Greenhouse effect; Dispersed knowledge; Middleman minorities; Unintended consequences; Black redneck theory; Global analysis of affirmative action; Einstein syndrome
- Awards: Francis Boyer Award (1990); American Philosophical Society (1998); National Humanities Medal (2002); Bradley Prize (2004); GetAbstract International Book Award (2008)
- Military career
- Allegiance: United States
- Branch: United States Marine Corps
- Service years: 1951–1952
- Conflicts: Korean War
- Website: tsowell.com

Thomas Sowell (/soʊl/ SOHL; born June 30, 1930) is an American economist, economic historian, and social theorist. With widely published commentary and books—and as a guest on TV and radio—he is a well-known voice in the American conservative movement as a prominent black conservative. He is a senior fellow at the Hoover Institution and was a recipient of the National Humanities Medal from President George W. Bush in 2002. (Note: Sowell declined to be awarded the National Humanities Medal in person. Justice Clarence Thomas received it on his behalf on February 23, 2003.)

Sowell was born in Gastonia, North Carolina, and grew up in Harlem, New York City. Due to poverty and difficulties at home, he dropped out of Stuyvesant High School and worked various odd jobs, eventually serving in the United States Marine Corps during the Korean War. Afterward, he graduated with honors from Harvard University in 1958. He earned a master's degree in economics from Columbia University the next year, and a PhD in economics from the University of Chicago in 1968. In his academic career, he held professorships at Cornell University, Brandeis University, and the University of California, Los Angeles. He has also worked at think tanks, including the Urban Institute. Since 1977, he has worked at the Hoover Institution at Stanford University, where he is the Rose and Milton Friedman Senior Fellow on Public Policy.

Sowell has influenced a wide range of economists, intellectuals, and public figures, including fellow economist Walter E. Williams and U.S. Supreme Court justice Clarence Thomas. He was offered a position as Federal Trade Commissioner in the Ford administration and was considered for posts including U.S. Secretary of Education in the Reagan administration, but declined both.

Sowell is the author of more than 45 books (including revised and new editions) on a variety of subjects, including politics, economics, education, and race, and he has been a syndicated columnist in more than 150 newspapers. His views are described as conservative on social issues, libertarian on economics, or libertarian-conservative. He has said he may be best labeled as a libertarian, though he disagrees with the "libertarian movement" on some issues, such as national defense.

== Early life ==
Sowell was born in 1930 into a poor family in Gastonia, North Carolina. His father died shortly before his birth. His mother, a house maid who already had four children, died a few years later from complications during childbirth. He was adopted and raised by his great-aunt Molly and her two adult daughters. In his autobiography A Personal Odyssey, Sowell wrote that his childhood encounters with white people were so limited that he did not know blond was a hair color. He recalls that his first memories were living in a small wooden house in Charlotte, which he stated was typical of most black neighborhoods. It was located on an unpaved street and had no electricity or running water. When Sowell was nine, he moved with his extended family from North Carolina to Harlem, New York City. He and his aunt were forced to room in other people's apartments, due to frequent family quarrels.

Sowell qualified for Stuyvesant High School, a prestigious academic high school in New York City; he was the first in his family to study beyond the sixth grade. However, he was forced to drop out at age 17 because of financial difficulties and family quarreling. He worked a number of odd jobs, including long hours at a machine shop, and as a delivery man for Western Union. He also tried out for the Brooklyn Dodgers in 1948. Sowell was drafted into the armed services in 1951 during the Korean War and was assigned to the U.S. Marine Corps. Although Sowell opposed the war and experienced racism, he was able to find fulfillment as a photographer, which eventually became his favorite hobby. He was honorably discharged in 1952.

=== Higher education and early career ===
After leaving military service, Sowell completed high school, took a civil service job in Washington, D.C., and attended night classes at Howard University, a historically black college. His high scores on the College Board examinations and recommendations by two professors helped him gain admission to Harvard University, where he graduated magna cum laude in 1958 with a Bachelor of Arts degree in economics. He earned a Master of Arts degree from Columbia University the following year. Sowell had initially chosen Columbia University to study under George Stigler, who would later receive the Nobel Prize in Economics, but when he learned that Stigler had moved to the University of Chicago, he followed him there and studied for his doctorate under Stigler upon arriving in the fall of 1959.

Sowell has said that he was a Marxist during his 20s. One of his earliest professional publications was a sympathetic examination of Marxist thought vs. Marxist–Leninist practice. But in 1960, he began to change his mind toward supporting free-market economics after studying the possible impact of minimum wages on unemployment of sugar-industry workers in Puerto Rico, as a U.S. Department of Labor intern. Workers at the department were surprised by his questioning, he said, and he concluded, "they certainly weren't going to engage in any scrutiny of the law".

Sowell received his Doctor of Philosophy in economics from the University of Chicago in 1968. His dissertation was titled "Say's law and the General glut Controversy".

== Academic career ==
From 1965 to 1969, Sowell was an assistant professor of economics at Cornell University. Writing 30 years later about the 1969 seizure of Willard Straight Hall by black students at Cornell, Sowell characterized the students as "hoodlums" with "serious academic problems [who were] admitted under lower academic standards", and noted, "it so happens that the pervasive racism that black students supposedly encountered at every turn on campus and in town was not apparent to me during the four years that I taught at Cornell and lived in Ithaca."

Sowell has taught economics at Howard University, Rutgers, Cornell, Brandeis University, Amherst College, and the University of California, Los Angeles. At Howard, Sowell wrote, he was offered the position as head of the economics department, but he declined. Since 1980, he has been a senior fellow of the Hoover Institution at Stanford University, where he holds a fellowship named after Rose and Milton Friedman, his mentor. The Hoover appointment, because it did not involve teaching, gave him more time for his numerous writings. In addition, Sowell appeared several times on William F. Buckley Jr.'s show Firing Line, during which he discussed the economics of race and privatization. Sowell has written that he gradually lost faith in the academic system, citing low academic standards and counterproductive university bureaucracy, and he resolved to leave teaching after his time at the University of California, Los Angeles. In A Personal Odyssey, he recounts, "I had come to Amherst, basically, to find reasons to continue teaching. What I found, instead, were more reasons to abandon an academic career."

In an interview, Sowell said he had been offered a position as Federal Trade Commissioner by the Ford administration in 1976, but that after pursuing the opportunity, he withdrew from consideration to avoid the political games surrounding the position. He said in another interview that he was offered the post of United States Secretary of Education, but declined. In 1980, after Reagan's election, Sowell and Henry Lucas organized the Black Alternatives Conference to bring together black and white conservatives; one attendee was a young Clarence Thomas, then a congressional aide. Sowell was appointed as a member of the Economic Policy Advisory Committee of the Reagan administration, but resigned after the first meeting, disliking travel from the West Coast and lengthy discussions in Washington; of his decision to resign, Sowell cited "the opinion (and the example) of Milton Friedman, that some individuals can contribute more by staying out of government".

In 1987, Sowell testified in favor of federal appeals court judge Robert Bork during the hearings for Bork's nomination to the U.S. Supreme Court. In his testimony, Sowell said that Bork was "the most highly qualified nominee of this generation" and that what he viewed as judicial activism, a concept that Bork opposed as a self-described originalist and textualist, "has not been beneficial to minorities."

In a review of Sowell's 1987 book, A Conflict of Visions, Larry D. Nachman in Commentary described Sowell as a leading representative of the Chicago school of economics.

== Writings and thought ==
Themes of Sowell's writing range from social policy on race, ethnic groups, education, and decision-making, to classical and Marxian economics, to the problems of children perceived as having disabilities.

Sowell had a nationally syndicated column distributed by Creators Syndicate that was published in Forbes and National Review magazines, and The Wall Street Journal, The Washington Times, The New York Post, and other major newspapers, as well as online on websites such as RealClearPolitics, Townhall, WorldNetDaily, and the Jewish World Review. Sowell commented on current issues, which include liberal media bias; judicial activism and originalism; abortion; minimum wage; universal healthcare; the tension between government policies, programs, and protections and familial autonomy; affirmative action; government bureaucracy; gun control; militancy in U.S. foreign policy; the war on drugs; multiculturalism; mob rule; and the overturning of Roe v. Wade. According to The Journal of Blacks in Higher Education, Sowell was the most cited black economist between 1991 and 1995, and second-most cited between 1971 and 1990. (Note: The article finds that "black economists who are most frequently cited are almost never economic theoreticians. Rather, they tend to be social commentators who write widely on issues of race.")

Sowell was a frequent guest on The Rush Limbaugh Show, in conversations with Walter E. Williams, who was a substitute host for Limbaugh.

On December 27, 2016, Sowell announced the end of his syndicated column, writing that, at age 86, "the question is not why I am quitting, but why I kept at it so long", and cited a desire to focus on his photography hobby.

The TV show Free to Choose, distributed by the Free to Choose Network, features Sowell along with Milton Friedman and a number of other panelists as they discuss the relationship between freedom and individual economic choices. A documentary detailing his career entitled "Thomas Sowell: Common Sense in a Senseless World" was released by the Free to Choose Network in 2021.

=== Economic and political ideology ===
Until the spring of 1972, Sowell was a registered Democrat, after which he then left the Democratic Party and resolved not to associate with any political party again, stating, "I was so disgusted with both candidates that I didn't vote at all." Though he is often described as a black conservative, Sowell said, "I prefer not to have labels, but I suspect that 'libertarian' would suit me better than many others, although I disagree with the libertarian movement on a number of things." He has been described as one of the most prominent advocates of contemporary classical liberalism along with Friedrich Hayek and Larry Arnhart. Sowell primarily writes on economic subjects, generally advocating a free-market approach to capitalism. Sowell opposes the Federal Reserve, arguing that it has been unsuccessful in preventing economic depressions and limiting inflation. Sowell described his study of Karl Marx in his autobiography; as a former Marxist, who early in his career became disillusioned with it, he emphatically opposes Marxism, providing a critique in his book Marxism: Philosophy and Economics (1985).

Sowell has also written a trilogy of books on ideologies and political positions, including A Conflict of Visions, in which he speaks on the origins of political strife; The Vision of the Anointed, in which he compares the conservative/libertarian, and liberal/progressive worldviews; and The Quest for Cosmic Justice, in which, as in many of his other writings, he outlines his thesis of the need felt by intellectuals, politicians, and leaders to fix and perfect the world in utopian and ultimately, he posits, disastrous fashions. Separate from the trilogy, but also in discussion of the subject, he wrote Intellectuals and Society, building on his earlier work, in which he discusses what he argues to be the blind hubris and follies of intellectuals in a variety of areas.

His book Knowledge and Decisions, a winner of the 1980 Law and Economics Center Prize, was heralded as a "landmark work", selected for this prize "because of its cogent contribution to our understanding of the differences between the market process and the process of government". In announcing the award, the center acclaimed Sowell, whose "contribution to our understanding of the process of regulation alone would make the book important, but in reemphasizing the diversity and efficiency that the market makes possible, [his] work goes deeper and becomes even more significant." Friedrich Hayek wrote: "In a wholly original manner, [Sowell] succeeds in translating abstract and theoretical argument into highly concrete and realistic discussion of the central problems of contemporary economic policy."

Sowell opposes the imposition of minimum wages by governments, arguing in his book Basic Economics, "Unfortunately, the real minimum wage is always zero, regardless of the laws, and that is the wage that many workers receive in the wake of the creation or escalation of a government-mandated minimum wage, because they either lose their jobs or fail to find jobs when they enter the labor force." He goes further to argue that minimum wages disproportionately affect "members of racial or ethnic minority groups" that have been discriminated against. He asserts, "Before federal minimum-wage laws were instituted in the 1930s, the black unemployment rate was slightly lower than the white unemployment rate in 1930. But then followed the Davis-Bacon Act of 1931, the National Industrial Recovery Act (NIRA) of 1933, and the Fair Labor Standards Act (FLSA) of 1938 – all of which imposed government-mandated minimum wages, either on a particular sector or more broadly... By 1954, black unemployment rates were double those of whites and have continued to be at that level or higher. Those particularly hard hit by the resulting unemployment have been black teenaged males."

Sowell also favors decriminalization of all drugs. He opposes gun control laws, arguing, "On net balance, they do not save lives, but cost lives."

=== Race and ethnicity ===
Sowell has been a prominent critic of government and civil rights policy approaches on race, and has argued that systemic racism is an untested, questionable hypothesis, writing, "I don't think even the people who use it have any clear idea what they're saying", and compared it to propaganda tactics used by Joseph Goebbels because if it is "repeated long enough and loud enough", people "cave in" to it.

In several of his works—including The Economics and Politics of Race (1983), Ethnic America (1981), Affirmative Action Around the World (2004), and other books—Sowell challenges the notion that black progress is due to progressive government programs or policies. He claims that many problems identified with black people in modern society are not unique, neither in terms of American ethnic groups, nor in terms of a rural proletariat struggling with disruption as it became urbanized, as discussed in his Black Rednecks and White Liberals (2005). He is critical of affirmative action and race-based quotas.

When people get used to preferential treatment, equal treatment seems like discrimination.

He takes issue with the notion of government as a helper or savior of minorities, arguing that the historical record shows the opposite. In Affirmative Action Around the World, Sowell holds that affirmative action affects more groups than is commonly understood, though its impacts occur through different mechanisms, and has long since ceased to favor blacks.

One of the few policies that can be said to harm virtually every group in a different way. ... Obviously, whites and Asians lose out when you have preferential admission for black students or Hispanic students—but blacks and Hispanics lose out because what typically happens is the students who have all the credentials to succeed in college are admitted to colleges where the standards are so much higher that they fail.

In Intellectuals and Race (2013), Sowell argues that intelligence quotient (IQ) gaps are hardly startling or unusual between, or within, ethnic groups. He notes that the roughly 15-point gap in contemporary black–white IQ scores is similar to that between the national average and the scores of certain ethnic white groups in years past, in periods when the nation was absorbing new immigrants.

=== Late-talking and the Einstein syndrome ===
Sowell's book The Einstein Syndrome: Bright Children Who Talk Late was published in 2001. In it, Sowell discusses what he calls the "Einstein syndrome", which refers to the phenomenon of late-talking children. Sowell says these children are frequently misdiagnosed with autism or pervasive developmental disorder. He includes the research of Stephen Camarata and Steven Pinker, among others.

Sowell says this trait affected many historical figures who developed prominent careers, such as physicists Albert Einstein, Edward Teller, and Richard Feynman; mathematician Julia Robinson; and musicians Arthur Rubinstein and Clara Schumann. According to Sowell, some children develop unevenly (asynchronous development) for a period in childhood due to rapid and extraordinary development in the analytical functions of the brain. This may temporarily "rob resources" from neighboring functions such as language development.

=== Politics ===
In a 2009 column titled "The Bush Legacy", Sowell assessed President George W. Bush as "a mixed bag", but "an honorable man."

Sowell said the media was "filtering and spinning" its coverage regarding abortions and has spoken out against sex-selective abortion. In 2018, he named George Washington, Abraham Lincoln, Ronald Reagan, and Calvin Coolidge as presidents he liked.

==== Donald Trump ====
Sowell was strongly critical of Republican presidential nominee Donald Trump and grudgingly endorsed Ted Cruz in the 2016 Republican presidential primaries, criticizing him as well, stating, "we can only make our choices among those actually available." During the 2016 Republican primary, Sowell criticized Trump, questioning whether Trump had "any principles at all, other than promoting Donald Trump?" Two weeks before the 2016 presidential election, Sowell recommended voting for Trump over Hillary Clinton, because he would be "easier to impeach." In 2018, when asked on his thoughts of Trump's presidency, Sowell replied, "I think he's better than the previous president [Barack Obama]." During interviews in 2019, Sowell defended Trump against charges of racism.

In 2025, Sowell criticized Trump's "Liberation Day" tariffs, comparing them to the 1930 Smoot-Hawley tariffs from the start of the Great Depression. Sowell warned that the tariffs might set off a global trade war resulting in a "great reduction in international trade". He further cautioned that policy unpredictability might lead to people hanging on to their money, which would cause economic effects similar to those seen in the Great Depression.

==== Joe Biden presidential nomination ====
In 2020, Sowell wrote that if the Democratic presidential nominee Joe Biden won the 2020 presidential election, it could signal a point of no return for the United States, a tipping point akin to the fall of the Roman Empire. In an interview in July 2020, he stated, "the Roman Empire overcame many problems in its long history, but eventually it reached a point where it could no longer continue, and much of that was from within, not just the barbarians attacking from outside." Sowell wrote that if Biden became president, the Democratic Party would have an enormous amount of control over the nation, and if this happened, they could twin with the "radical left" and ideas such as defunding the police could come to fruition.

=== Education ===
Sowell has written about education throughout his career. He has argued for the need for reform of the school system in the United States. In his book Charter Schools and Their Enemies (2020), Sowell compares the educational outcomes of school children educated at charter schools with those at conventional public schools. In his research, Sowell first explains the need and his methodology for choosing comparable students—both ethnically and socioeconomically—before listing his findings. He presents the case that charter schools on the whole do significantly better in terms of educational outcomes than conventional schools.

Sowell argues that many U.S. schools are failing children, contends that "indoctrination" has taken the place of proper education, and argues that teachers' unions have promoted harmful education policies. Sowell contends that many schools have become monopolies for educational bureaucracies.

In his book Education: Assumptions Versus History (1986), Sowell analyzes the state of education in U.S. schools and universities. In particular, he examines the experiences of blacks and other ethnic groups in the American education system, and identifies the factors and patterns behind both success and failure.

== Reception ==
Classical liberals, libertarians, and conservatives of different disciplines have received Sowell's work positively. Among these, he has been noted for originality, depth and breadth, clarity of expression, and thoroughness of research. Sowell's publications have been received positively by economists Steven Plaut, Steve H. Hanke, James M. Buchanan, and John B. Taylor; philosophers Carl Cohen and Tibor Machan; science historian Michael Shermer; essayist Gerald Early; political scientists Abigail Thernstrom and Charles Murray; psychologists Steven Pinker and Jonathan Haidt; and Josef Joffe, publisher and editor of Die Zeit. Steve Forbes, in a 2015 column, stated that "it's a scandal that economist Thomas Sowell has not been awarded the Nobel Prize. No one alive has turned out so many insightful, richly researched books."

Nathan J. Robinson stated that Sowell "is not given much attention by mainstream scholars in the academy, and few of his books are reviewed by major liberal-leaning publications." He suggested this may be because "[h]is books rarely engage with the major academic literature on the subject he's writing about" and he often "leaves out crucial pieces of data that would make his position look weaker", citing his writing on minimum wage policy and unemployment as an example. Economist James B. Stewart wrote a critical review of Black Rednecks and White Liberals, calling it "the latest salvo in Thomas Sowell's continuing crusade to represent allegedly dysfunctional value orientations and behavioral characteristics of African Americans as the principal reasons for persistent economic and social disparities." He also criticized it for downplaying the impact of slavery. Particularly in black communities in the 1980s Sowell became, in historian Michael Ondaatje's words, "persona non grata, someone known to talk about, rather than with, African Americans". Economist Bernadette Chachere, law professor Richard Thompson Ford, and sociologists William Julius Wilson and Richard Coughlin have criticized some of his work.

Criticisms include neglecting discrimination against women in the workforce in Rhetoric or Reality?, the methodology of Race and Culture: A World View, and portrayal of opposing theories in Intellectuals and Race. Economist Jennifer Doleac criticized Discrimination and Disparities, arguing that statistical discrimination is real and pervasive (Sowell argues that existing racial disparities are mostly due to accurate sorting based on underlying characteristics, such as education) and that government intervention can achieve societal goals and make markets work more efficiently. Columnist Steven Pearlstein criticized Wealth, Poverty and Politics.

== Personal life ==
Sowell was married to Alma Jean Parr from 1964 to 1975, and married Mary Ash in 1981. He has two children.

== Legacy and honors ==
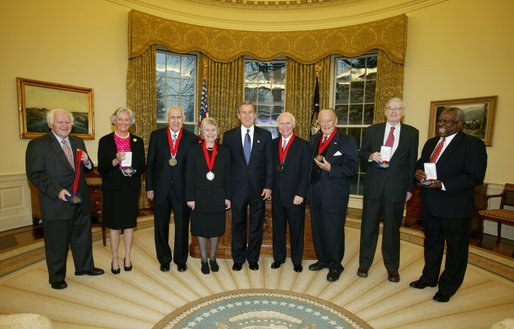
Clarence Thomas (last on right) accepting the 2002 National Humanities Medal on Sowell's behalf

- 1982: Mencken Award for Best Book, from the Free Press Association, for his Ethnic America: A History.
- 1990: Francis Boyer Award, presented by the American Enterprise Institute.
- 1998: Sydney Hook Award, from the National Association of Scholars.
- 1998: Elected membership to the American Philosophical Society.
- 2002: National Humanities Medal, presented by President George W. Bush, for prolific scholarship melding history, economics, and political science.
- 2003: Bradley Prize for intellectual achievement.
- 2004: Lysander Spooner Award, presented by Laissez Faire Books, for his Applied Economics: Thinking Beyond Stage One.
- 2008: International Book Award, from getAbstract, for his book Economic Facts and Fallacies

== Career chronology ==
- Labor economist, U.S. Department of Labor, June 1961 – August 1962
- Instructor in economics, Douglass College, Rutgers University, September 1962 – June 1963
- Lecturer in economics, Howard University, September 1963 – June 1964
- Economic analyst, American Telephone & Telegraph Co., June 1964 – August 1965
- Assistant professor of economics, Cornell University, September 1965 – August 1969
- Associate professor of economics, Brandeis University, September 1969 – June 1970
- Associate professor of economics, University of California, Los Angeles, September 1970 – June 1972
- Project director, Urban Institute, August 1972 – July 1974
- Fellow, Center for Advanced Study in the Behavioral Sciences, July 1976 – March 1977
- Visiting professor of economics, Amherst College, September–December 1977
- Fellow, Hoover Institution, Stanford University, April–August 1977
- Professor of economics, UCLA, July 1974 – June 1980
- Senior fellow, Hoover Institution, September 1980–present

== Selected publications ==
=== Books ===
- 1971. Economics: Analysis and Issues. Scott Foresman & Co.
- 1972. Black Education: Myths and Tragedies. David McKay Co.. ISBN 0679300155.
- 1972. Say's Law: An Historical Analysis. Princeton University Press. ISBN 978-0691041667.
- 1974. Classical Economics Reconsidered. Princeton University Press. ISBN 978-0691003580.
- 1975. Race and Economics. David McKay Co. ISBN 978-0679302629.
- 1980. Knowledge and Decisions. Basic Books. ISBN 978-0465037360.
- 1981. Ethnic America: A History. Basic Books. ISBN 0465020747.
  - Chapter 1, "The American Mosaic."
- 1981. Markets and Minorities. Basic Books. ISBN 0465043992.
- 1981. Pink and Brown People: and Other Controversial Essays. Hoover Press. ISBN 0817975322.
- 1983. The Economics and Politics of Race. William Morrow. ISBN 0688018912.
- 1984. Civil Rights: Rhetoric or Reality? William Morrow. ISBN 0688031137.
- 1985. Marxism: Philosophy and Economics. Quill. ISBN 0688064264.
- 1986. Education: Assumptions Versus History. Hoover Press. ISBN 0817981128.
- 1987. A Conflict of Visions: Ideological Origins of Political Struggles. William Morrow. ISBN 0688069126.
- 1987. Compassion Versus Guilt and Other Essays. William Morrow. ISBN 0688071147.
- 1990. Preferential Policies: An International Perspective. ISBN 0688085997
- 1993. Inside American Education. New York: The Free Press. ISBN 0743254082.
- 1993. Is Reality Optional?: and Other Essays. Hoover. ISBN 978-0817992620.
- 1995. Race and Culture: A World View. ISBN 0465067964.
- 1995. The Vision of the Anointed: Self-Congratulation As a Basis for Social Policy. Basic Books. ISBN 046508995X.
- 1996. Migrations and Cultures: A World View. ISBN 0465045898. OCLC 41748039.
- 1998. Conquests and Cultures: An International History. ISBN 0465014003.
- 1998. Late-Talking Children. ISBN 0465038352.
- 1999. The Quest for Cosmic Justice. ISBN 0684864630.
- 2000. A Personal Odyssey. ISBN 0684864657.
- 2000. Basic Economics: A Citizen's Guide to the Economy (1st ed.). Basic Books. ISBN 0465081452.
- 2002. Controversial Essays. Hoover. ISBN 0817929924.
- 2002. The Einstein Syndrome: Bright Children Who Talk Late. ISBN 046508141X.
- 2003. Applied Economics: Thinking Beyond Stage One. ISBN 0465081436.
- 2004. Affirmative Action Around the World: An Empirical Study. New Haven, CT: Yale University Press. ISBN 978-0300107753.
- 2004. Basic Economics: A Citizen's Guide to the Economy (revised and expanded ed.). New York: Basic Books.
- 2005. Black Rednecks and White Liberals. San Francisco: Encounter Books. ISBN 978-1594030864.
- 2006. Ever Wonder Why?: and Other Controversial Essays. Stanford, CA: Hoover Institution Press. ISBN 978-0817947521. OCLC 253604328. ASIN 0817947523.
- 2006. On Classical Economics. New Haven, CT: Yale University Press. ISBN 978-0300126068.
- 2007. A Man of Letters. San Francisco, CA: Encounter Books. ISBN 978-1594031960.
- 2007. Basic Economics: A Common Sense Guide to the Economy (3rd ed.). Cambridge, MA: Perseus Books. ISBN 978-0465002603. OCLC 76897806.
- 2008. Applied Economics: Thinking Beyond Stage One (2nd ed.). Basic Books. ISBN 978-0465003457. OCLC 260206351.
- 2008. Economic Facts and Fallacies. Basic Books. ISBN 978-0465003495. OCLC 1033591370. ASIN 0465003494.
- 2009. The Housing Boom and Bust. Basic Books. ISBN 978-0465018802.
  - Chapter 5, "The Past and the Future."
- 2010. Basic Economics: A Common Sense Guide to the Economy (4th ed.). Cambridge, MA: Perseus Books. ISBN 978-0465022526.
- 2010. Dismantling America: and Other Controversial Essays. Basic Books. ISBN 978-0465022519. OCLC 688505777.
- 2010. Intellectuals and Society. Basic Books. ISBN 978-0465019489. Lay summary.
- 2011. The Thomas Sowell Reader. Basic Books. ISBN 978-0465022502.
- 2011. Economic Facts and Fallacies, 2nd edition. Basic Books. ISBN 978-0465022038
- 2013. Intellectuals and Race. Basic Books. ISBN 978-0465058723.
- 2014. Basic Economics: A Common Sense Guide to the Economy (5th ed.). New York: Basic Books. ISBN 978-0465060733.
- 2015. Wealth, Poverty and Politics: An International Perspective. Basic Books.
- 2016. Wealth, Poverty and Politics: An International Perspective (2nd ed.). Basic Books. ISBN 978-0465096763.
- 2018. Discrimination and Disparities. Basic Books. ISBN 978-1541645608.
- 2019. Discrimination and Disparities (revised, enlarged ed.). Basic Books. ISBN 978-1541645639.
- 2020. Charter Schools and Their Enemies. Basic Books. ISBN 978-1541675131.
- 2023. Social Justice Fallacies. Basic Books. ISBN 978-1541603929.

=== Selected essays ===
- Sowell, Thomas (May 1973). "Arthur Jensen and His Critics: The Great IQ Controversy". Change. 5 (4): 33–37. doi:10.1080/00091383.1973.10568506. JSTOR 40161749.
- 1975. "Affirmative Action Reconsidered. Was It Necessary in Academia?" (Evaluation Studies 27). Washington, DC: American Enterprise Institute for Public Policy Research. ISBN 0844731994. LCCN 75-42779.
- 1979. "Status versus Behavior." Washington University Law Review 1979(1):179–188.
- 1982. "Weber and Bakke, and the Presuppositions of 'Affirmative Action'." pp. 37–63 in Discrimination, Affirmative Action, and Equal Opportunity: An Economic and Social Perspective, edited by W.E. Block and M.A. Walker. Fraser Institute. ISBN 978-0889750395.
- 2002. "The Education of Minority Children." pp. 79–92 in Education in the Twenty-First Century, edited by E. P. Lazear. Stanford, CA: Hoover Institution Press. Available via eText.
- 2002. "Discrimination, Economics, and Culture." pp. 167–180 in Beyond the Color Line: New Perspectives on Race and Ethnicity in America, edited by A. Thernstrom and S. Thernstrom. Hoover Institution Press.
- 2012. "'Trickle Down' Theory and 'Tax Cuts for the Rich'" (Hoover Institution Press Publication 635) Stanford, CA: Hoover Institution Press. ISBN 978-0817916152. Google Books: EY3prsH-5bwC.

== See also ==
- Greenhouse effect (United States Supreme Court)
- List of newspaper columnists
- List of people from Harlem
