= The Independent Review =

American quarterly political journal

- Discipline: Public policy, political science, political economy
- Language: English
- Edited by: Robert Whaples

Publication details
- History: 1996–present
- Publisher: The Independent Institute (United States)
- Frequency: Quarterly
- Open access: Delayed
- Impact factor: 0.237 (2012)

Standard abbreviations
- ISO 4: Indep. Rev.

Indexing
- CODEN: IREVFP
- ISSN: 1086-1653
- LCCN: 96652948
- OCLC no.: 33958358

Links
- Journal homepage

The Independent Review: A Journal of Political Economy is a quarterly peer-reviewed academic journal covering political economy and the critical analysis of government policy. It is published by the Independent Institute, a conservative libertarian think tank in the United States. The journal was established in 1996.

== History ==
The journal was established in 1996. Until 2013, Robert Higgs was the editor-in-chief. In 2013, Higgs became "editor at large" and was succeeded by Robert Whaples.

== Abstracting and indexing ==
The journal is abstracted and indexed in:

- Academic Search 1000
- Columbia International Affairs Online
- EBSCO databases
- EconLit
- Education Resources Information Center (ERIC)
- International Political Science Abstracts
- PAIS International
- ProQuest databases
- Social Sciences Citation Index
- Sociological Abstracts

According to the Journal Citation Reports, the journal has a 2012 impact factor of 0.237.
