= Specific language impairment =

- Specialty: Neurology, Speech–language pathology

Specific language impairment (SLI) is diagnosed when a child's language does not develop normally and the difficulties cannot be accounted for by generally slow development, physical abnormality of the speech apparatus, autism spectrum disorder, apraxia, acquired brain damage or hearing loss. Twin studies have shown that it is under genetic influence. Although language impairment can result from a single-gene mutation, this is unusual. More commonly SLI results from the combined influence of multiple genetic variants, each of which is found in the general population, as well as environmental influences.

== Classification ==
Specific language impairment (SLI) is diagnosed when a child has delayed or disordered language development for no apparent reason. Usually the first indication of SLI is that the child is later than usual in starting to speak and subsequently is delayed in putting words together to form sentences. Spoken language may be immature. In many children with SLI, understanding of language, or receptive language, is also impaired, though this may not be obvious unless the child is given a formal assessment.

Although difficulties with use and understanding of complex sentences are a common feature of SLI, the diagnostic criteria encompass a wide range of problems, and for some children other aspects of language are problematic (see below). In general, the term SLI is reserved for children whose language difficulties persist into school age, and so it would not be applied to toddlers who are late to start talking, most of whom catch up with their peer group after a late start.

=== Terminology ===
The terminology for children's language disorders is extremely wide-ranging and confusing, with many labels that have overlapping but not necessarily identical meanings. In part this confusion reflects uncertainty about the boundaries of SLI, and the existence of different subtypes. Historically, the terms "developmental dysphasia" or "developmental aphasia" were used to describe children with the clinical picture of SLI. These terms have, however, largely been abandoned, as they suggest parallels with adult acquired aphasia. This is misleading, as SLI is not caused by brain damage.

Some synonyms currently in use for specific language impairment are language impairment, developmental language delay (DLD), language disorder, and language-learning disability. Researcher Bonnie Brinton argues that the term "specific language impairment" is misleading because the disorder does not only affect language, but also affects reading, writing, and social/pragmatics.

In medical circles, terms such as specific developmental language disorder are often used, but this has the disadvantage of being wordy, and is also rejected by some people who think SLI should not be seen as a "disorder". In the UK educational system, speech, language and communication needs (SLCN) is currently the term of choice, but this is far broader than SLI, and includes children with speech and language difficulties arising from a wide range of causes.

=== Subtypes (Rapin and Allen 1987) ===
Although most experts agree that children with SLI are quite variable, there is little agreement on how best to subtype them. There is no widely accepted classification system. In 1983 Rapin and Allen proposed a classification of developmental language disorders based on the linguistic features of language impairment, which was subsequently updated by Rapin. Rapin is a child neurologist, and she refers to different subtypes as "syndromes"; many of those coming from the perspective of education or speech-language therapy reject this kind of medical label, and argue that there is not a clear dividing line between SLI and normal variation. Also, although most experts would agree that children with characteristics of the Rapin subtypes can be identified, there are many cases who are less easy to categorise, and there is also evidence that categorisation can change over time.

Rapin's subgroups fall into three broad categories:

==== Receptive/expressive developmental language disorder ====
Receptive/expressive phonologic/syntactic deficit syndrome is the most common form of SLI, in which the child's most obvious problems are a tendency to speak in short, simplified sentences, with omission of some grammatical features, such as past tense -ed. It is common also to see simplified speech production when the child is young. For instance, clusters of consonants may be reduced, so that "string" is pronounced as "ting". Vocabulary is often limited, with a tendency to use "general all-purpose" terms, rather than more specific words.

Verbal auditory agnosia is a very rare form of language impairment, in which the child appears unable to make sense of speech sounds. It typically occurs as a symptom of Landau-Kleffner syndrome, in which case a diagnosis of SLI would not be appropriate, as there is a known neurological origin of the language difficulties.

==== Expressive developmental language disorder syndromes ====
Developmental verbal dyspraxia (DVD) – in the child with DVD, comprehension is adequate; the onset of speech is very delayed and extremely limited with impaired production of speech sounds and short utterances. The poor speech production cannot be explained in terms of structural or neurological damage of the articulators. There is much disagreement about diagnostic criteria, but the label most often used for children whose intelligibility declines markedly when they attempt complex utterances, compared to when they are producing individual sounds or syllables.

Another key feature is inconsistency of speech sound production from one occasion to another. Although the term "dyspraxia" suggests a pure output disorder, many – perhaps all – of these children have difficulty in doing tasks that involve mentally manipulating speech sounds, such as phonological awareness tasks. Children with DVD also typically have major literacy problems, and receptive language levels may be poor on tests of vocabulary and grammar.

Phonologic programming deficit syndrome – the child speaks in long but poorly intelligible utterances, producing what sounds like jargon. Outside Rapin's group, little has been written about this subtype, which is not generally recognised in diagnostic frameworks.

==== Higher order processing disorders ====
Lexical deficit disorder – the child has word finding problems and difficulty putting ideas into words. There is poor comprehension for connected speech. Again, there is little research on this subtype, which is not widely recognised.

Pragmatic language impairment – the child speaks in fluent and well-formed utterances with adequate articulation; content of language is unusual; comprehension may be over-literal and language use is odd. The child may chatter incessantly and be poor at turn-taking in conversation and maintaining a topic. There has been a great deal of controversy about this category, which is termed pragmatic language impairment (PLI) in the UK. Debate has centred over the question of whether it is a subtype of SLI, part of the autistic spectrum, or a separate condition. In DSM-5, the term Social Communication Disorder has been introduced; this is equivalent to PLI.

=== Relationship with other neurodevelopmental disorders ===
Although textbooks draw clear boundaries between different neurodevelopmental disorders, there is much debate about overlaps between them. Many children with SLI meet diagnostic criteria for developmental dyslexia, and others have features of autism.

== Presentation ==
=== Associated factors ===
Males are more affected by SLI than females. In clinical samples, the sex ratio of affected males: females is around 3 or 4:1. The reason for this association is not known: no linkage has been found to genes on the sex chromosomes. Poor motor skills are commonly found in children with SLI. Brain scans do not usually reveal any obvious abnormalities in children with SLI, although quantitative comparisons have found differences in brain size or relative proportions of white or grey matter in specific regions. In some cases, unusual brain gyri are found. To date, no consistent "neural signature" for SLI has been found. Differences in the brains of children with SLI vs typically developing children are subtle and may overlap with atypical patterns seen in other neurodevelopmental disorders.

== Genetic ==
It is now generally accepted that SLI is a strongly genetic disorder. The best evidence comes from studies of twins. Two twins growing up together are exposed to the same home environment, yet may differ radically in their language skills. Such different outcomes are, however, seen almost exclusively in fraternal (non-identical) twins, who are genetically different. Identical twins share the same genes and tend to be much more similar in language ability.

There can be some variation in the severity and persistence of SLI in identical twins, indicating that environmental factors affect the course of disorder, but it is unusual to find a child with SLI who has an identical twin with normal language.

SLI is not usually caused by a mutation in a single gene. Current evidence suggests that there are many different genes that can influence language learning, and SLI results when a child inherits a particularly detrimental combination of risk factors, each of which may have only a small effect. It has been hypothesized, however, that a mutation of the FOXP2 gene may have an influence on the development on SLI to a certain degree, as it regulates genes pertinent to neural pathways related to language.

Only a handful of non-genetic factors have been found selectively to impact on language development in children. Later-born children in large families are at greater risk than earlier born.

Overall, genetic mutation, hereditary influences, and environmental factors may all have a role in the development and manifestation of SLI. It is important, therefore, to not associate the development to a single factor, but recognize that it is oftentimes the result of complex interactions between any or all of these factors.

== Diagnosis ==
SLI is defined purely in behavioural terms: there is no biological test for SLI. There are three points that need to be met for a diagnosis of SLI:

- The child has language difficulties that interfere with daily life or academic progress
- Other causes are excluded: the problems cannot be explained in terms of hearing loss, general developmental delay, autism, or physical difficulty in speaking
- Performance on a standardized language test (see assessment, below) is significantly below age level

There is considerable variation in how this last criterion is implemented. Tombin et al. (1996) proposed the EpiSLI criterion, based on five composite scores representing performance in three domains of language (vocabulary, grammar, and narration) and two modalities (comprehension and production). Children scoring in the lowest 10% on two or more composite scores are identified as having language disorder.

=== Assessment ===
Assessment will usually include an interview with the child's caregiver, observation of the child in an unstructured setting, a hearing test, and standardized tests of language and nonverbal ability. There is a wide range of language assessments in English. Some are restricted for use by speech and language professionals (therapists or SALTs in the UK, speech-language pathologists, SLPs, in the US and Australia). A commonly used test battery for diagnosis of SLI is the Clinical Evaluation of Language Fundamentals (CELF). Assessments that can be completed by a parent or teacher can be useful to identify children who may require more in-depth evaluation.

The Grammar and Phonology Screening (GAPS) test is a quick (ten minute) simple and accurate screening test developed and standardized in the UK. It is suitable for children from 3–4 to 6–8 years; months and can be administered by professionals and non-professionals (including parents) alike, and has been demonstrated to be highly accurate (98% accuracy) in identifying impaired children who need specialist help vs non-impaired children. This makes it potentially a feasible test for widespread screening.

The Children's Communication Checklist (CCC–2) is a parent questionnaire suitable for testing language skills in school-aged children. Informal assessments, such as language samples, may also be used. This procedure is useful when the normative sample of a given test is inappropriate for a given child, for instance, if the child is bilingual and the sample was of monolingual children. It is also an ecologically valid measure of all aspects of language (e.g. semantics, syntax, pragmatics, etc.).

To complete a language sample, the SLP will spend about 15 minutes talking with the child. The sample may be of a conversation (Hadley, 1998), or narrative retell. In a narrative language sample, the SLP will tell the child a story using a wordless picture book (e.g. Frog Where Are You?, Mayer, 1969), then ask the child to use the pictures and tell the story back.

Language samples are typically transcribed using computer software such as the systematic analysis of language software (SALT, Miller et al. 2012), and then analyzed. For example, the SLP might look for whether the child introduces characters to their story or jumps right in, whether the events follow a logical order, and whether the narrative includes a main idea or theme and supporting details.

== Intervention ==
Intervention is usually carried out by speech and language therapists, who use a wide range of techniques to stimulate language learning. In the past, there was a vogue for drilling children in grammatical exercises, using imitation and elicitation methods, but such methods fell into disuse when it became apparent that there was little generalisation to everyday situations. Contemporary approaches to enhancing development of language structure are more likely to adopt 'milieu' methods, in which the intervention is interwoven into natural episodes of communication, and the therapist builds on the child's utterances, rather than dictating what will be talked about. In addition, there has been a move away from a focus solely on grammar and phonology toward interventions that develop children's social use of language, often working in small groups that may include typically developing as well as language-impaired peers.

Another way in which modern approaches to remediation differ from the past is that parents are more likely to be directly involved, particularly with preschool children.

A radically different approach has been developed by Tallal and colleagues, who have devised a computer-based intervention, Fast ForWord, that involves prolonged and intensive training on specific components of language and auditory processing. The theory underlying this approach maintains that language difficulties are caused by a failure to make fine-grained auditory discriminations in the temporal dimension, and the computerised training materials are designed to sharpen perceptual acuity.

For all these types of intervention, there are few adequately controlled trials that allow one to assess clinical efficacy. In general, where studies have been done, results have been disappointing, though some more positive outcomes have been reported. In 2010, a systematic review of clinical trials assessing the FastForword approach was published, and reported no significant gains relative to a control group.

== Outcome ==
Longitudinal studies indicate that problems are largely resolved by five years in around 40% of 4-year-olds with SLI. However, for children who still have significant language difficulties at school entry low levels of literacy are common, even for children who receive specialist help, and educational attainments are typically poor. Poor outcomes are most common in cases where comprehension as well as expressive language is affected. There is also evidence that the nonverbal IQ of children with SLI decreases over the course of development.

SLI is associated with a high rate of psychiatric disorder. For instance, Conti-Ramsden and Botting (2004) found that 64% of a sample of 11-year-olds with SLI scored above a clinical threshold on a questionnaire for psychiatric difficulties, and 36% were regularly bullied, compared with 12% of comparison children. In the longer-term, studies of adult outcomes of children with SLI find elevated rates of unemployment, social isolation and psychiatric disorder. However, most studies focused on children with severe problems, where comprehension as well as expressive language was affected. Better outcomes are found for children who have milder difficulties and do not require special educational provision.

== Prevalence ==
Epidemiological surveys, in the US and Canada, estimated the prevalence of SLI in five-year-olds at around 7%. However, neither study adopted the stringent "discrepancy" criteria of the Diagnostic and Statistical Manual of Mental Disorders (DSM) or ICD-10; SLI was diagnosed if the child scored below cut-off on standardized language tests, but had a nonverbal IQ of 90 or above and no other exclusionary criteria.

== Research ==
Much research has focused on trying to identify what makes language learning so hard for some children. A major divide is between theories that attribute the difficulties to a low-level problem with auditory temporal processing, and those that propose there is a deficit in a specialised language-learning system. Other accounts emphasise deficits in specific aspects of memory. It can be difficult to choose between theories because they do not always make distinctive predictions, and there is considerable heterogeneity among children with SLI. It has also been suggested that SLI may only arise when more than one underlying deficit is present.

== See also ==
- Auditory processing disorder
- Dual-route hypothesis to reading aloud
- Dyslexia
- Late talker
- Language delay
- Language processing
- Linguistics
- Origin of speech
- Pragmatic language impairment
- Speech–language pathology
- Speech sound disorder
- Tip of the tongue
