= Albert Einstein College of Medicine =

Private medical school in New York City

- Motto: Science at the heart of medicine
- Type: Private medical school
- Established: 1953; 73 years ago
- Parent institution: Montefiore Einstein Health System
- Dean: Yaron Tomer
- Faculty: 2,061 (2025)
- Students: 789 (2025)
- Location: The Bronx, New York City, New York, U.S.
- Campus: Urban
- Website: www.einsteinmed.edu

The Albert Einstein College of Medicine is a private medical school in New York City. Founded in 1953, Einstein is an independent degree-granting institution within the Montefiore Einstein Health System.

Einstein hosts MD, PhD, and master's programs. Admission to its MD program is highly selective, with an acceptance rate of 1.85% in 2024. Joint masters are offered with the City University of New York and Yeshiva University's Cardozo School of Law. Einstein is also home to one of the first three Medical Scientist Training Programs inaugurated in 1964. This joint MD/PhD program has received continuous funding from the National Institutes of Health.

Planning for the college was initiated by Yeshiva University President Samuel Belkin in 1945. Physicist Albert Einstein, who noted that the college would be unique as it would provide medical training to "students of all creeds and races", lent his name to the institution. Due to Yeshiva's financial difficulties, Einstein was transferred to Montefiore in 2015. Following a $1 billion donation to the school by Ruth Gottesman in 2024, Einstein became tuition-free for all MD students.

Einstein houses several NIH-designated centers and has contributed to major medical advances, including the first coronary artery bypass surgery. Faculty members have included 18 members of the National Academy of Sciences, three National Medal of Science recipients, and neurologist and writer Oliver Sacks. Alumni have made significant scientific contributions and include seven members of the National Academy of Sciences, two Howard Hughes Medical Investigators, a Lasker Award recipient, a MacArthur Fellow, a National Medal of Science awardee, a National Medal of Technology recipient, and one governor.

== History ==
=== Founding ===
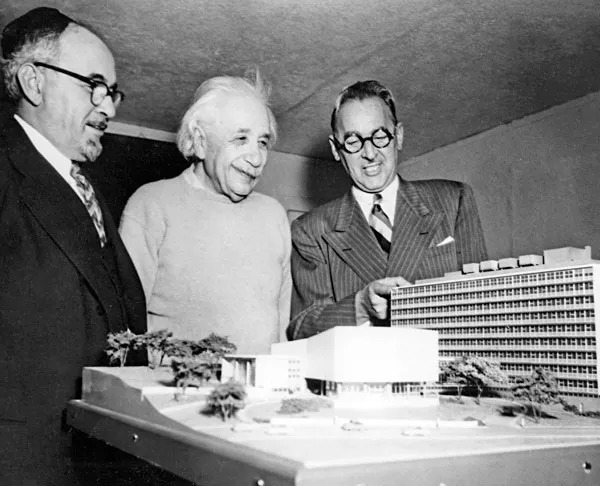
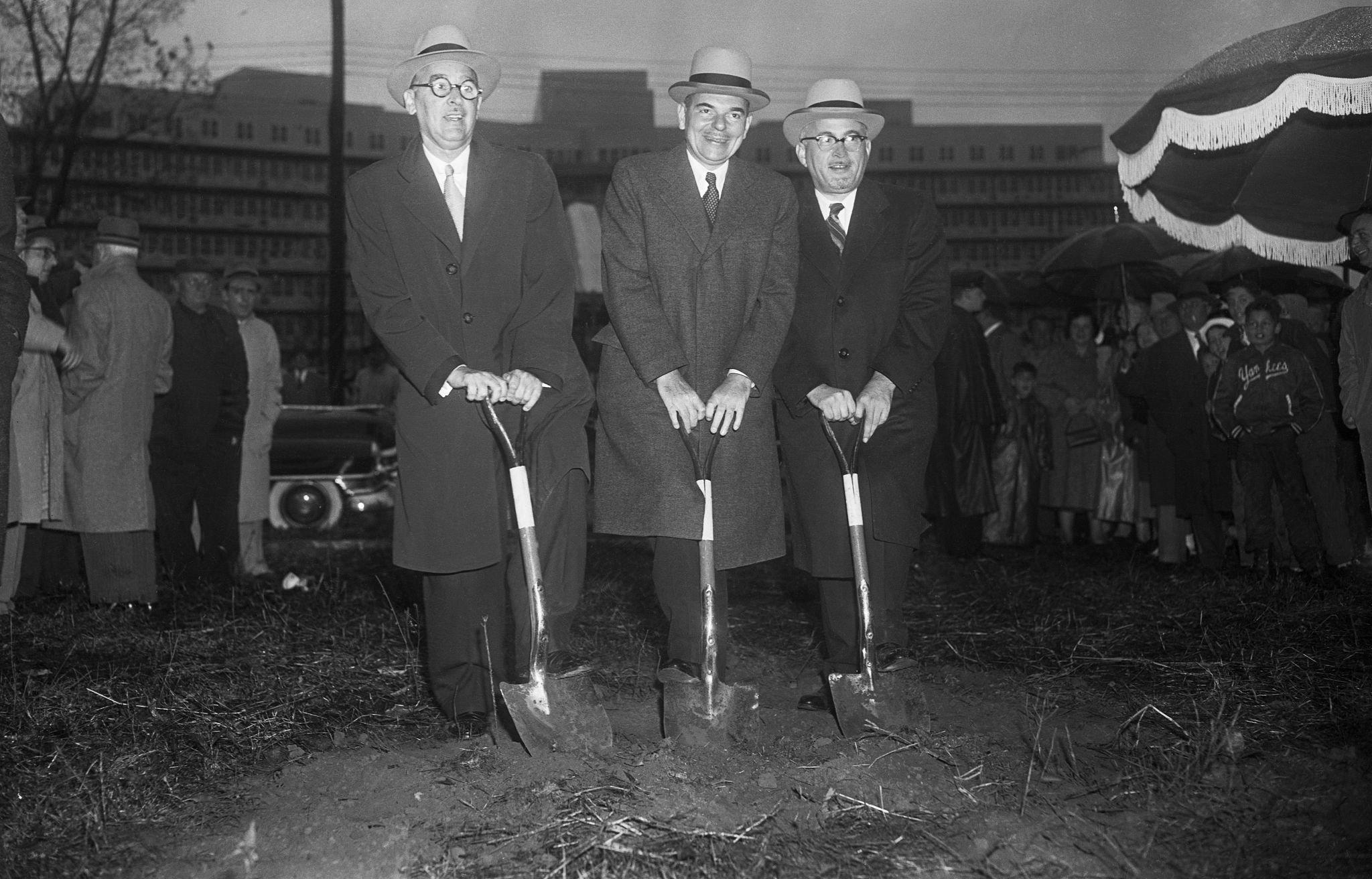
College namesake Albert Einstein (center) examines a model of the campus in 1953, and, at right, New York Attorney General Nathaniel Goldstein, Governor Thomas Dewey, and Yeshiva University head Samuel Belkin during the college's groundbreaking.

In 1945, Yeshiva University President Samuel Belkin began planning a new medical school. (Note: It is unclear if someone besides Belkin first initiated the campaign for Yeshiva to build a medical school, with Jaffé noting that it was likely "multifactorial". Key individuals were gastroenterologist Elihu Katz and biologist Shelley Saphine. As early as the 1930s, attorney Max Steuer had approached Yeshiva with plans to construct a new medical school, but nothing came of it due to Yeshiva's financial difficulties.) Under his urging, Yeshiva's Board of Trustees negotiated with the New York State Board of Regents to expand the university's charter to grant MD degrees, finalized in December 1950.

In 1951, physicist Albert Einstein wrote a letter to Belkin lauding the planned school, writing that it was "of the greatest importance to American Jewry" and would "welcome students of all creeds and races". He became an honorary chairman for the medical school campaign, alongside former First Lady Eleanor Roosevelt, New York Governor Thomas Dewey, and Richard Nixon.

When approached, Einstein was initially reluctant to associate his name with the school—he had recently refused to lend his name to Brandeis University and had declined to become the second president of Israel—and instead suggested that it be named for the Jewish physician Maimonides. Two years later, at an event marking his 74th birthday, March 14, 1953, Einstein agreed to lend his name to the medical school. (Note: The exact reason for Einstein' decision is unclear. According to Yeshiva University, it may have been a reaction to antisemitic quotas in medical schools and a way to preserve his legacy amidst his declining health.) At the gathering—his only public appearance in 22 years at the Institute for Advanced Study—Einstein told The New York Times that "physics has favored medicine by giving civilized man confidence in the scientific method." In 1954, the college sponsored the awarding of that year's Albert Einstein Award to physicist Richard Feynman and, on his 75th birthday, gifted Einstein a Festschrift with contributions from ten Nobel laureates, Israeli Prime Minister Moshe Sharett, and President Harry S. Truman, among others. Einstein died on April 18, 1955, months prior to the institution's dedication and opening.

Although affiliation with Mount Sinai Hospital in Manhattan was considered, a site in the Bronx's Morris Park was selected due to ample land and proximity to the adjacent Bronx Municipal Hospital then under construction. Construction of the first medical school building—now the Leo Forchheimer Medical Sciences Building—began in October 1953, with a contemporary design of steel and concrete. On September 12, 1955, Einstein welcomed its first class of 56 students in the partially completed Forchheimer Building. Einstein was the first new medical school to open in New York City since 1897 and the first in the United States to open under Jewish auspices.

=== Expansion ===
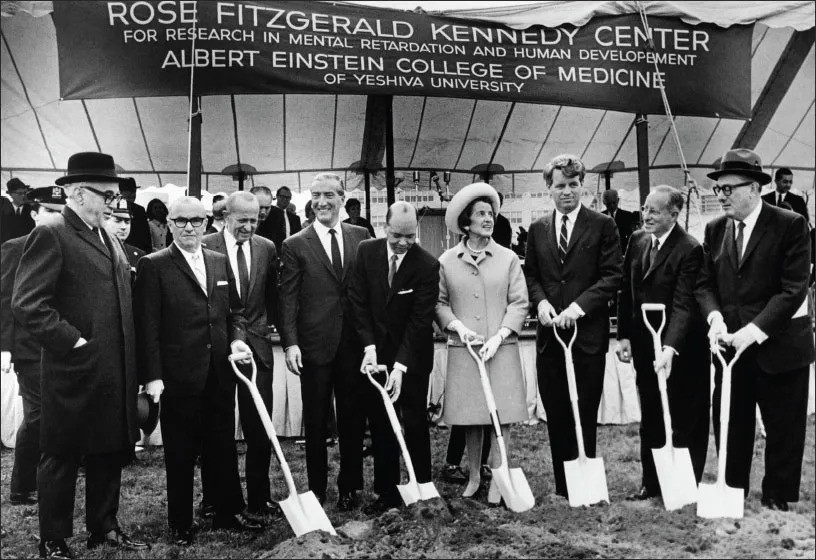
Family matriarch Rose Kennedy during the 1966 ground-breaking of the Rose F. Kennedy Center, with Senator Robert F. Kennedy to her left

The Sue Golding Graduate Division was established in 1957 to offer Doctor of Philosophy (PhD) degrees in biomedical science. In 1963, Einstein established its Department of Genetics, the first at any at any medical school; the coursework it offered was possibly the first formal medical curriculum on genetics. The following year, the Medical Scientist Training Program (MSTP), a combined MD/PhD program, was established.

The first successful coronary artery bypass surgery was performed in 1960 at Einstein by a team led by Robert H. Goetz; the procedure has been described in The Annals of Thoracic Surgery as "one of the most significant surgical achievements of the 20th century". In 1966, the school completed a 375-bed private teaching hospital—now known as the Jack D. Weiler Hospital—with New York City Mayor John Lindsay presiding over its opening.

The Ullmann Research Center for Health Sciences, a 12-story facility, opened in 1964. The following year, the Joseph P. Kennedy Jr. Foundation donated $1.45 million to Einstein to establish a center to study human development and mental disabilities. (Note: John F. Kennedy, then a US Senator, had given a speech at a Yeshiva University dinner celebrating Einstein's opening in October 1955.) The center, named for Rose F. Kennedy, opened with 200 staff scientists in 1970. Also that year, the college began construction on the 15-story Charles C. and Beulah Bassine Educational Center devoted to public health. Beginning in 1971, aided by a five-year, $12,157,000 federal grant, the college experimented with a 3-year MD degree pathway and increased class sizes.

=== Post-1990 ===
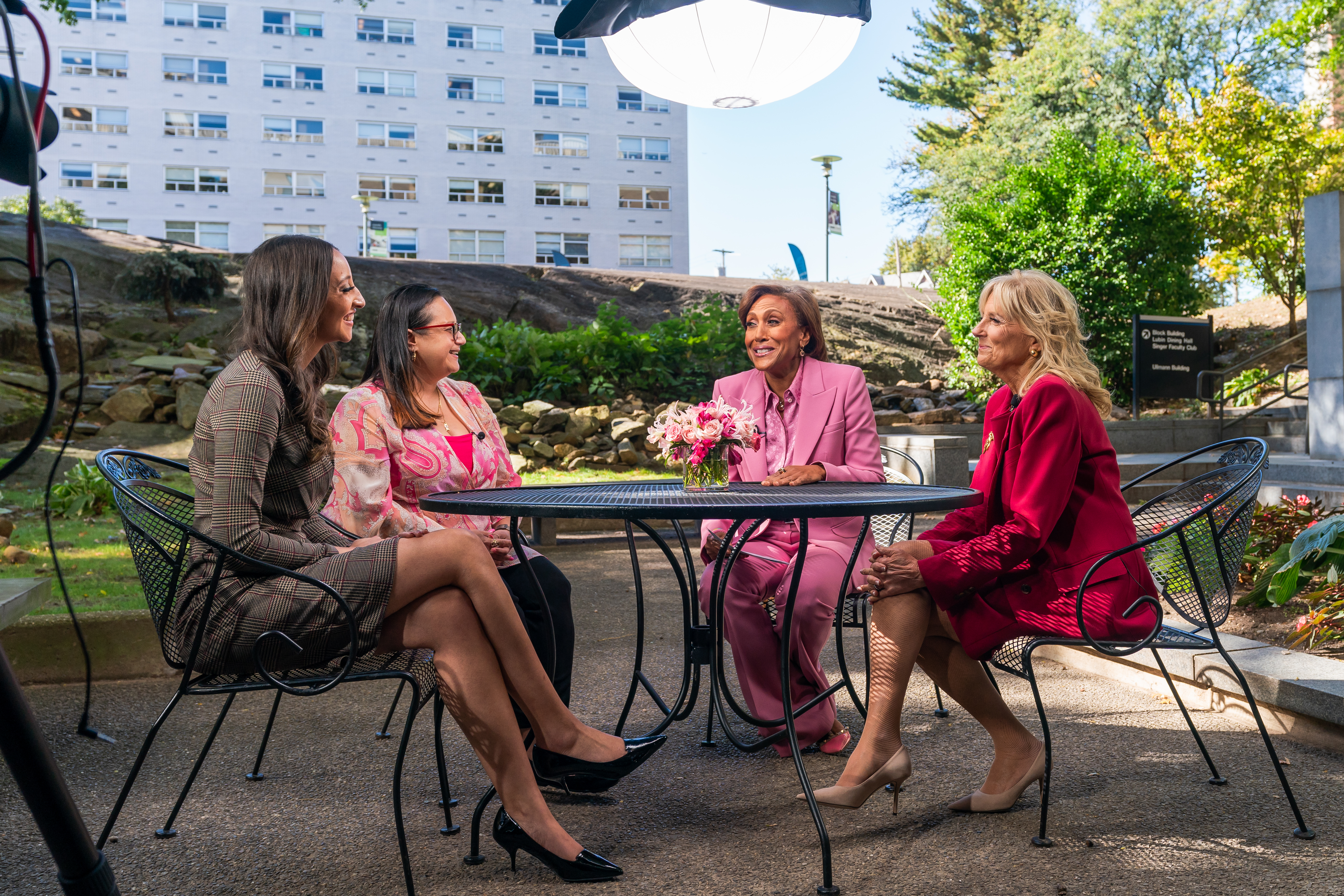
First Lady Jill Biden (far right) at Einstein, 2021

In 1990, following cumulative $8.5 million donations by Bronx businessman Jack Resnick, Einstein's campus was designated as the Jack and Pearl Resnick Campus. Six years later, Einstein built a 10-story research complex, the Samuel H. and Rachel Golding Building. In 2002, the college opened the three-story Gruss Magnetic Resonance Research Center. Equipped with magnetic resonance equipment beyond conventional MRI, the center was one of six such facilities in the world upon opening.

In 2008, Einstein opened a $225 million research complex, the Price Center. This expansion doubled the size of Einstein's campus to nearly 40 acres. Also that year, the college replaced its old logo—a "staid" portrait of Albert Einstein—with a stylized symbol that represents the helical structure of DNA, a notable spiral staircase on campus, and 'E' for Einstein.

In 2024, Ruth Gottesman—a long-time professor at the medical school and head of the board of trustees—donated $1 billion to the school to make tuition free for all students in perpetuity. The contribution also stipulated that the college never change its name. The donation was one of the largest to any educational institution, and, according to The New York Times, likely the largest donation to any medical school.

== Organization and affiliations ==
Einstein comprises 30 academic departments, spanning clinical care and both basic and translational research. The college's chief academic officer is the Marilyn and Stanley M. Katz Dean, a position held by Yaron Tomer since 2023. The Board of Trustees consists of three officers—Chair Ruth Gottesman, treasurer Nathan Gantcher, and Montefiore Einstein CEO and President Philip Ozuah as of 2025—and 28 members.

=== Montefiore ===
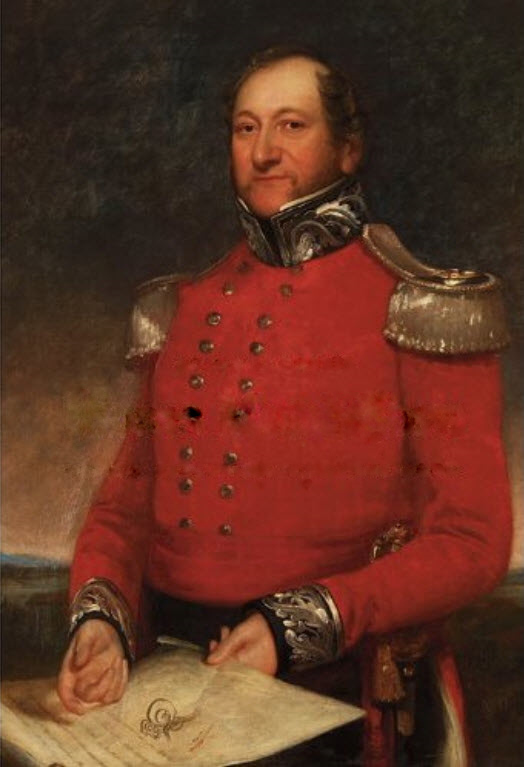
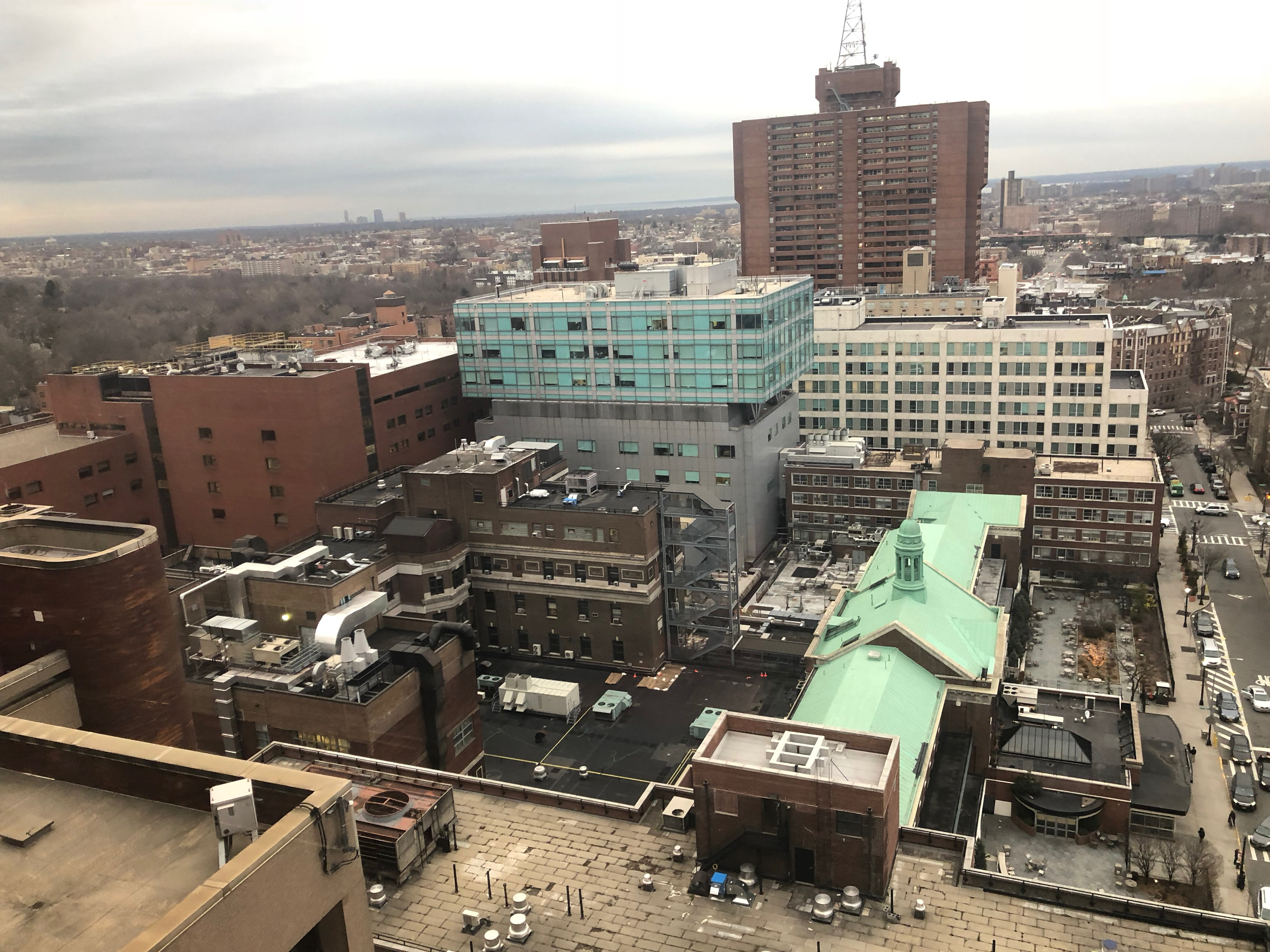
Financier Moses Montefiore (left) and Montefiore's Moses Campus (right) in the Bronx

Einstein's parent institution, Montefiore Health System, is a private non-profit healthcare system and one of the largest employers in New York. It comprises 15 member hospitals, including Montefiore Einstein Medical Center and Children's Hospital at Montefiore, and has the busiest emergency room in New York City and the ninth busiest in the United States. The system was founded in 1884 and is named for Moses Montefiore, a British financier and the Sheriff of London.

Einstein first became affiliated with Montefiore in 1963, with Montefiore attending physicians serving as Einstein faculty. By 1969, financial troubles led Yeshiva University to contract its Jack D. Weiler Hospital to the Montefiore Medical Center. In 1980, the college's Department of Medicine merged with Montefiore.

In the 2010s, Yeshiva University's mounting financial troubles—caused in part by Einstein's high operational costs and a $110 million loss to Bernie Madoff's Ponzi scheme in 2008—led the university to transfer ownership of the medical school to Montefiore in 2015. Although the deal's details were largely kept private, Einstein became a new entity with 51 percent ownership by Montefiore and 49 percent by Yeshiva. Montefiore assumed all operational and financial responsibilities. Yeshiva continued to grant Einstein's degrees until 2019, when the medical school achieved independent degree-granting authority. In 2021, Yeshiva and Montefiore launched a joint BA/BS-MD program for students entering Yeshiva.

=== Jacobi ===
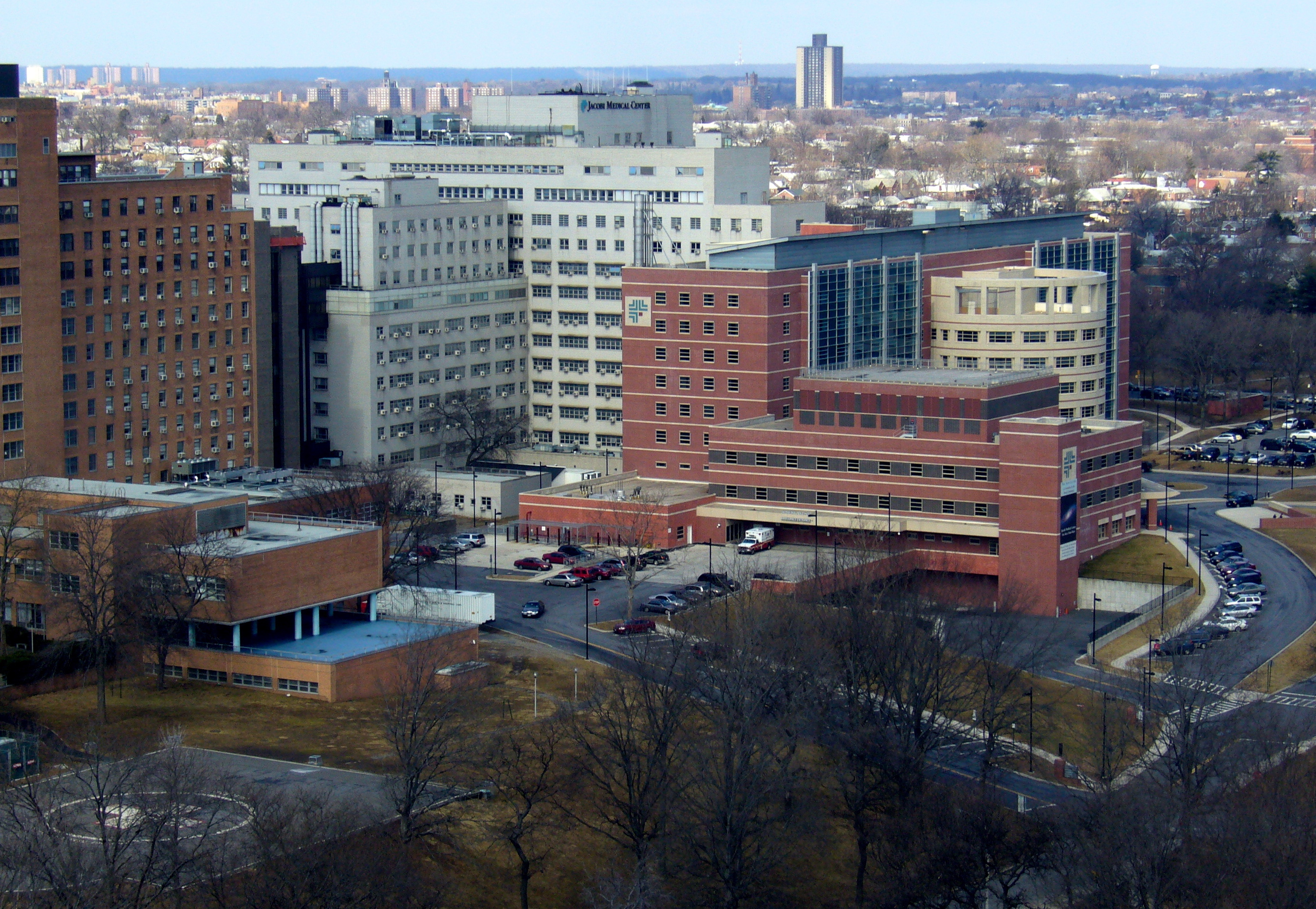
Jacobi Medical Center

In conjunction with the construction of Einstein's first building, New York City built a 1,349-bed, $37.5 million hospital adjacent to the school, now known as the Jacobi Medical Center. Belkin and New York City Mayor Vincent Impellitteri agreed to permit its use as Einstein's teaching hospital.

Jacobi is a member of NYC Health + Hospitals, the largest municipal health system in the United States. It serves as both the regional snakebite center and hyperbaric center for the New York tri-state area.

== Student body and campus ==
As of 2025, Einstein had 789 medical students according to U.S. News & World Report. Admission to Einstein's MD program is highly selective, with an acceptance rate of 1.85% in 2024. All students are awarded the full-tuition Gottesman Scholarship. The average post-scholarship cost of attendance for all four years is $138,000. New York residents comprise 44 percent of MD students.

Einstein offers housing for students and postdoctoral researchers. Student housing consists of three 28-story towers built in 1970. Living spaces include studios, three-bedroom penthouses, and one-, two-, or three-bedroom apartments. The campus also hosts a recreational facility, the Falk Center, that houses a gym, pool, and courts for basketball, racquetball, and squash. An underground parking garage is located on campus.

Campus of the Albert Einstein College of Medicine

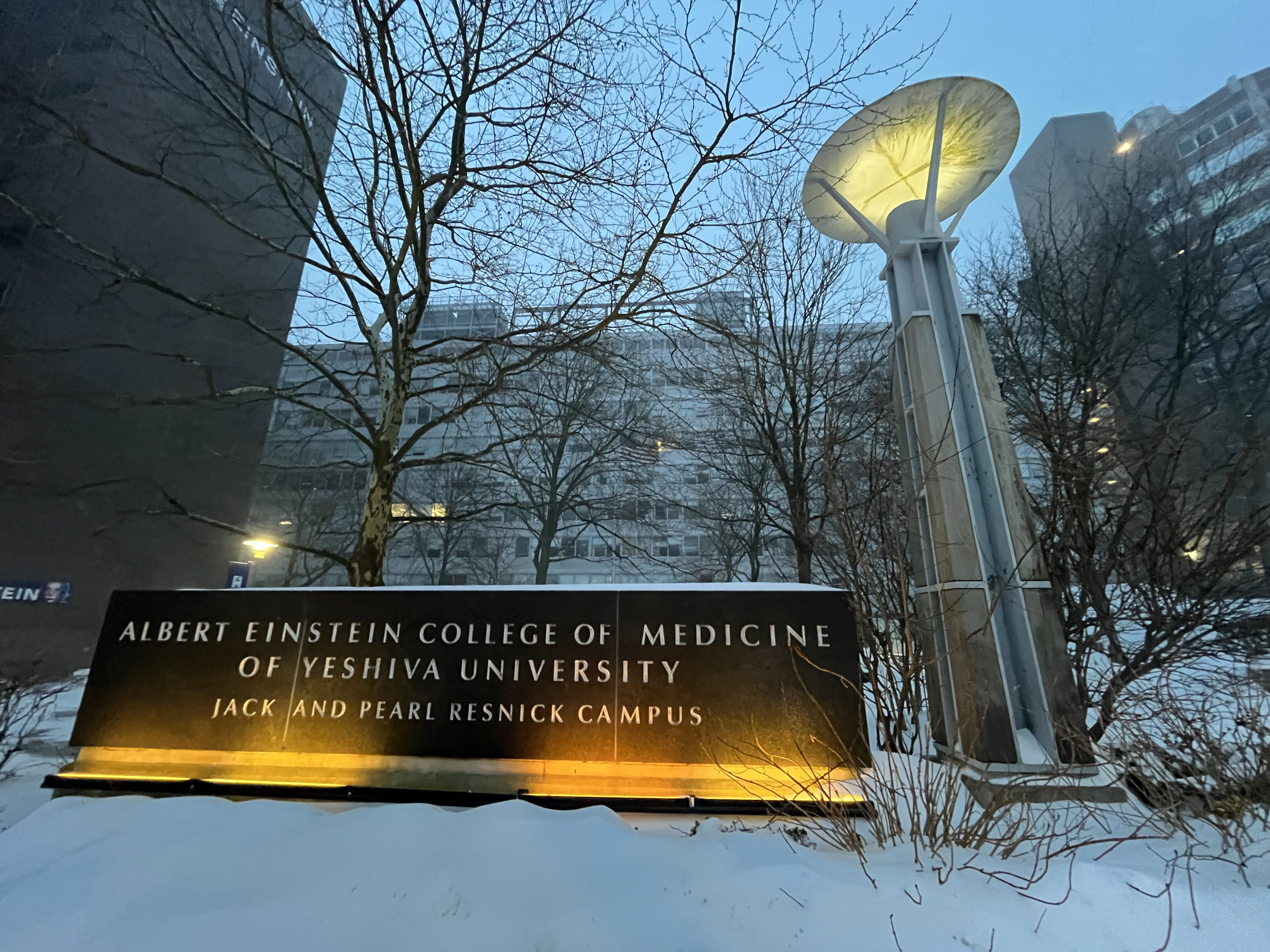
Entrance sign

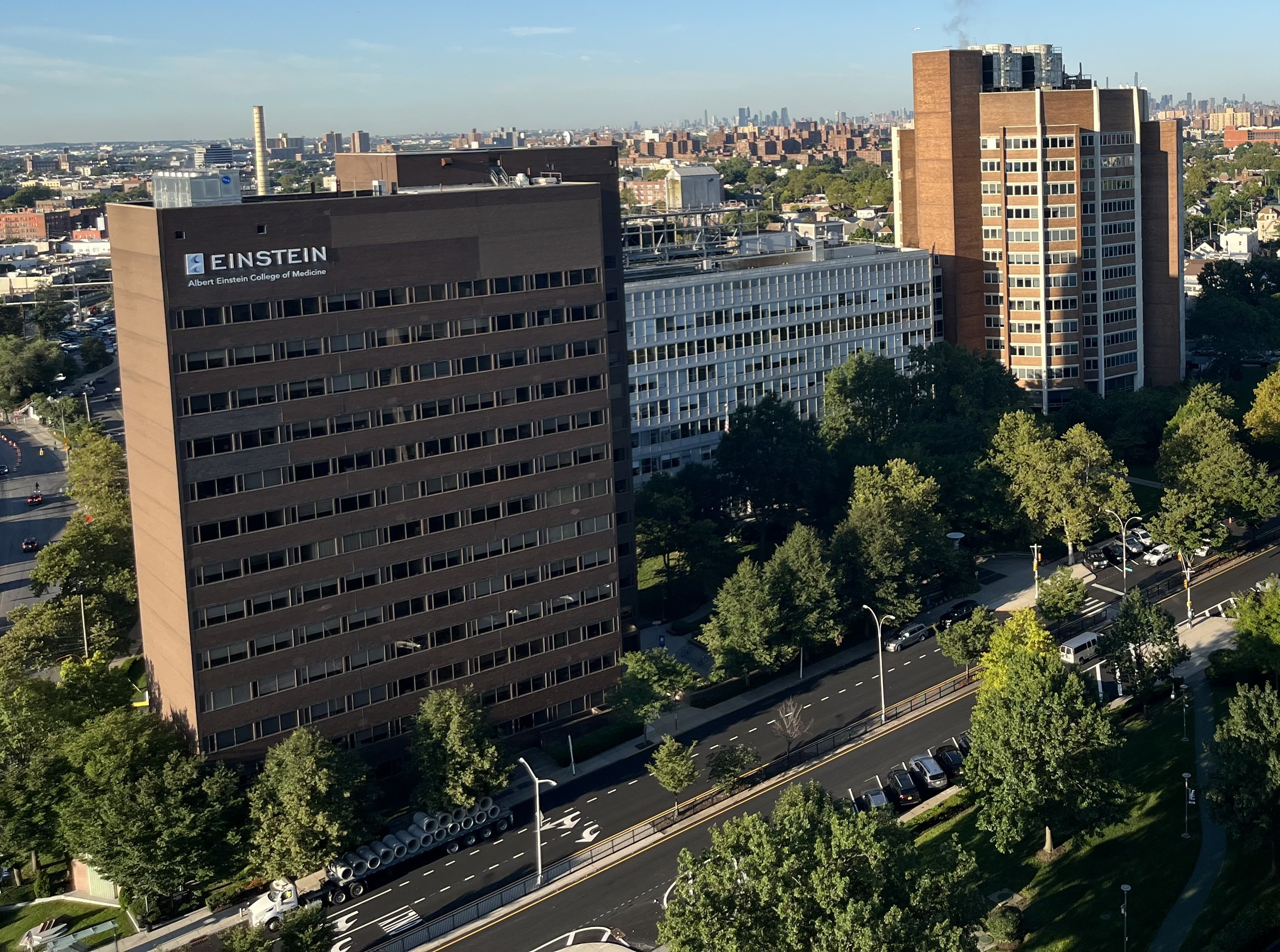
A complex on campus

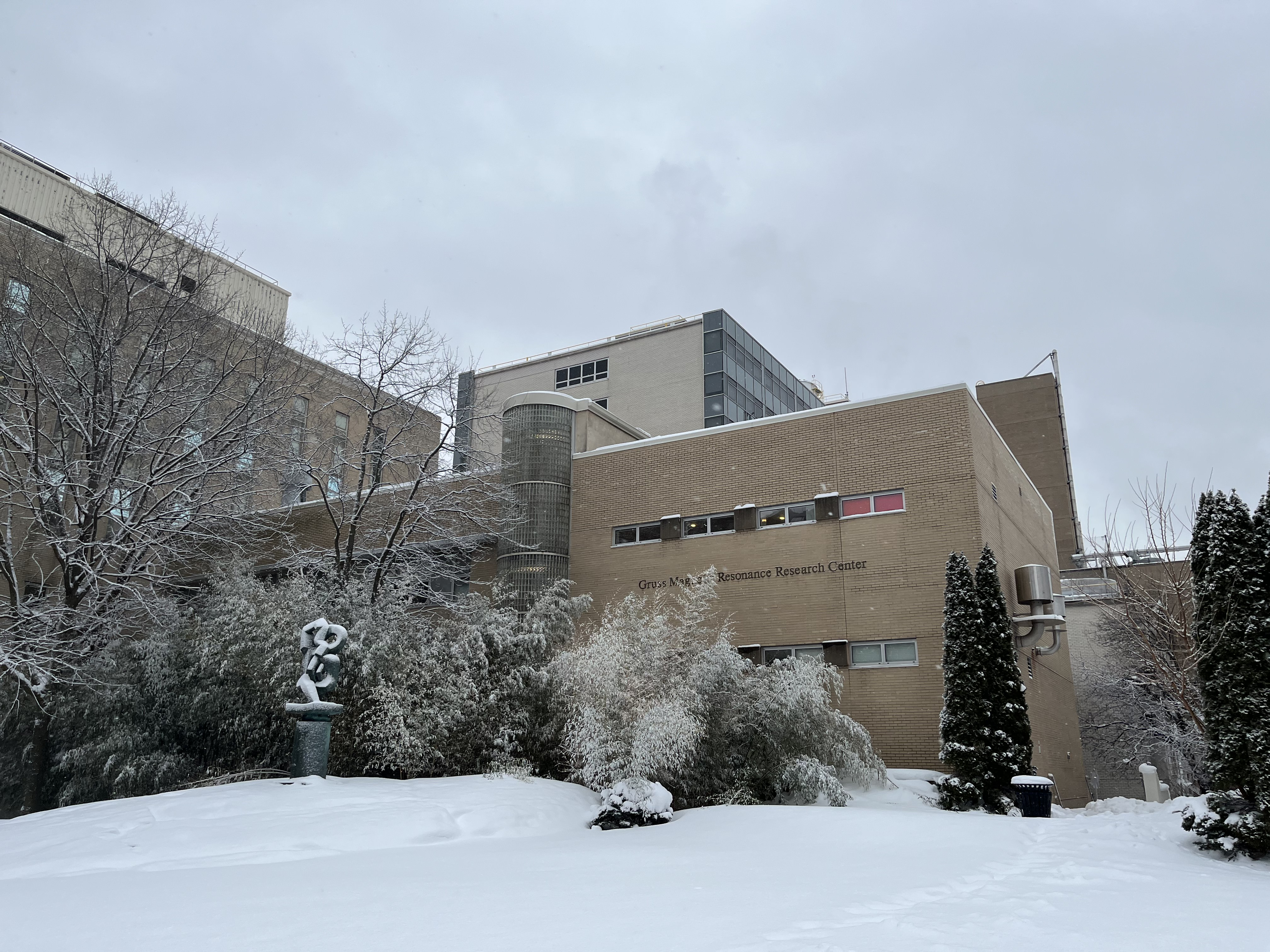
Gruss Magnetic Resonance Research Center

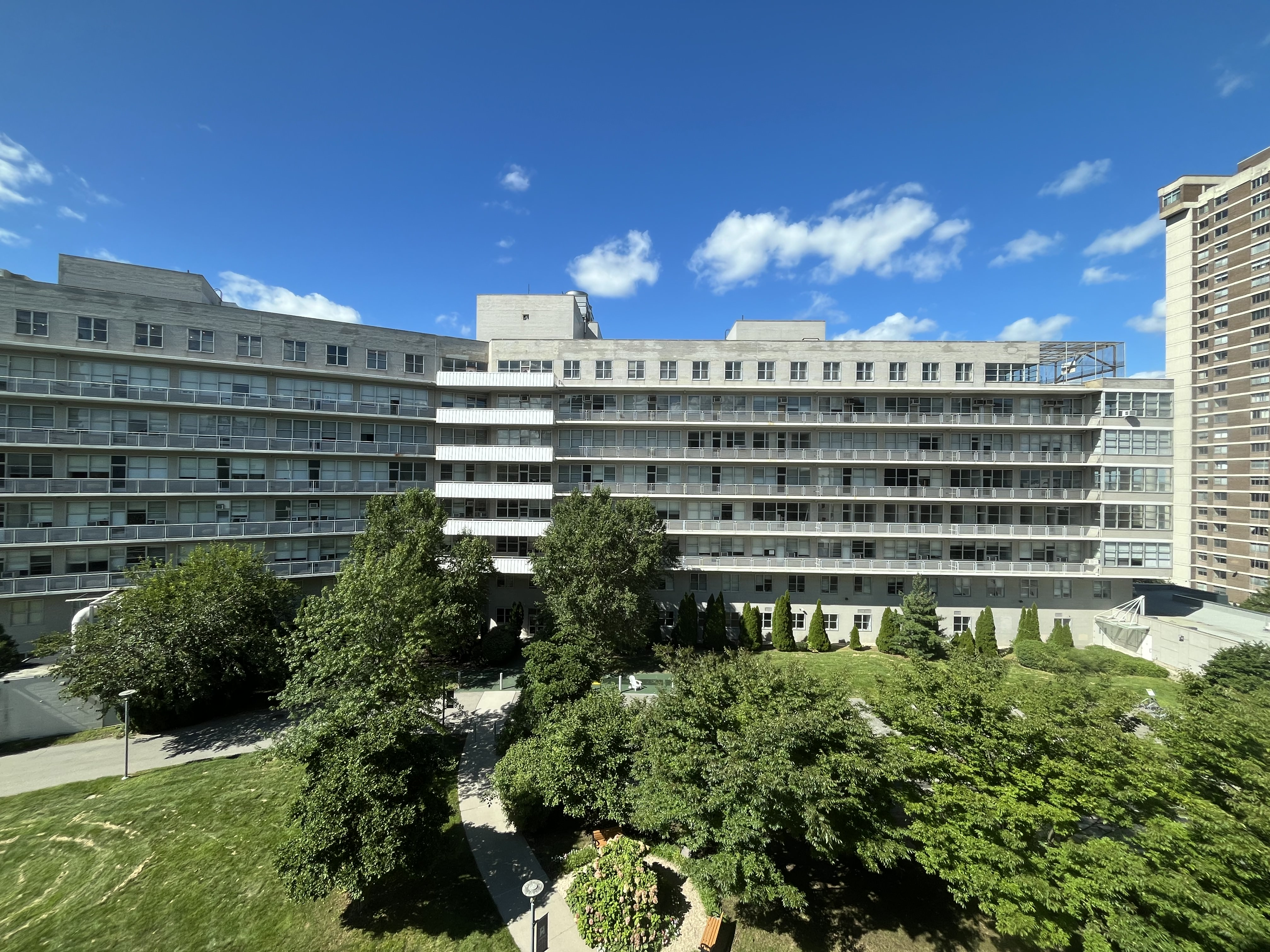
Van Etten Building

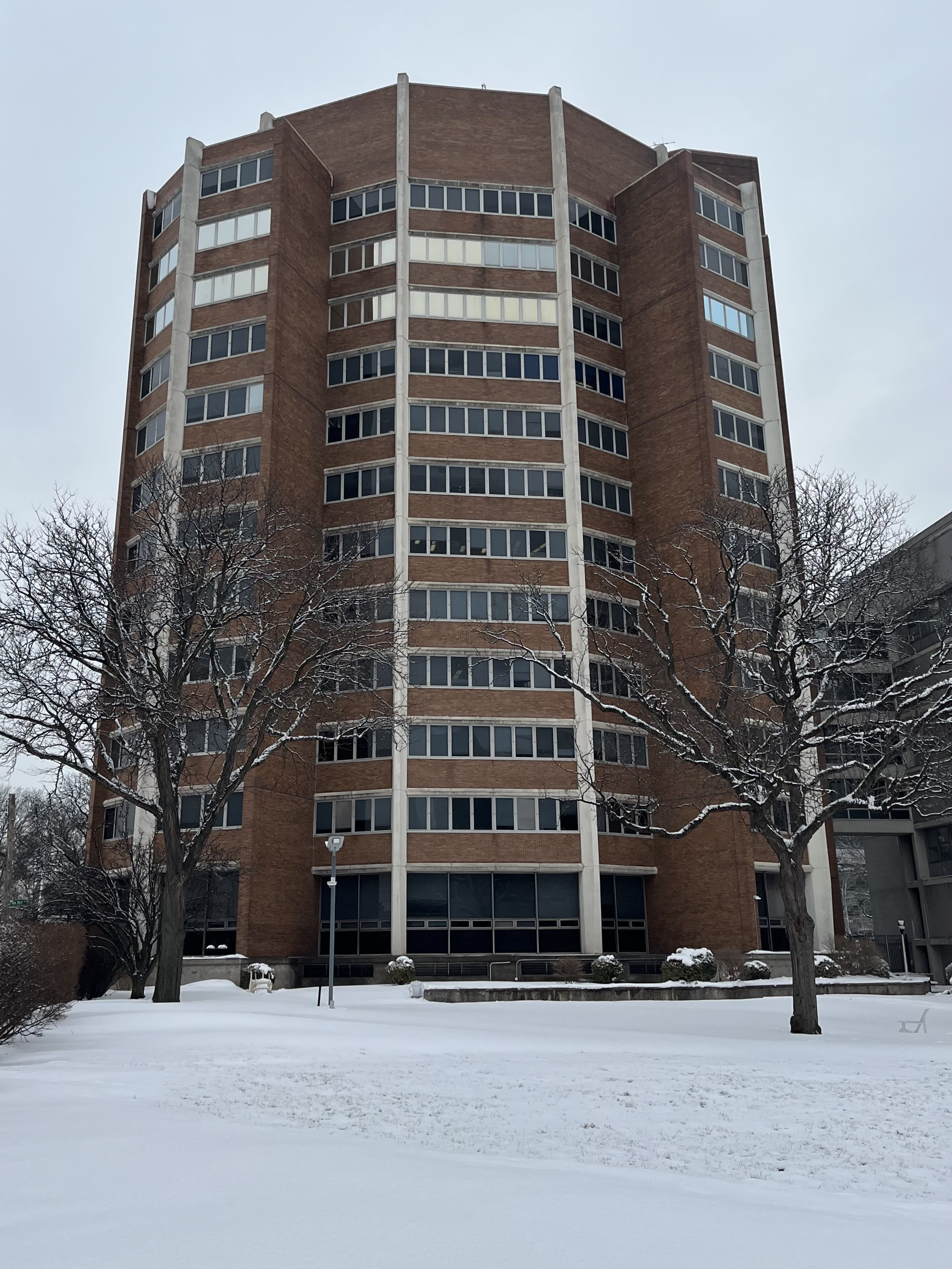
Ullmann Building

== Academic programs ==
=== MD program ===
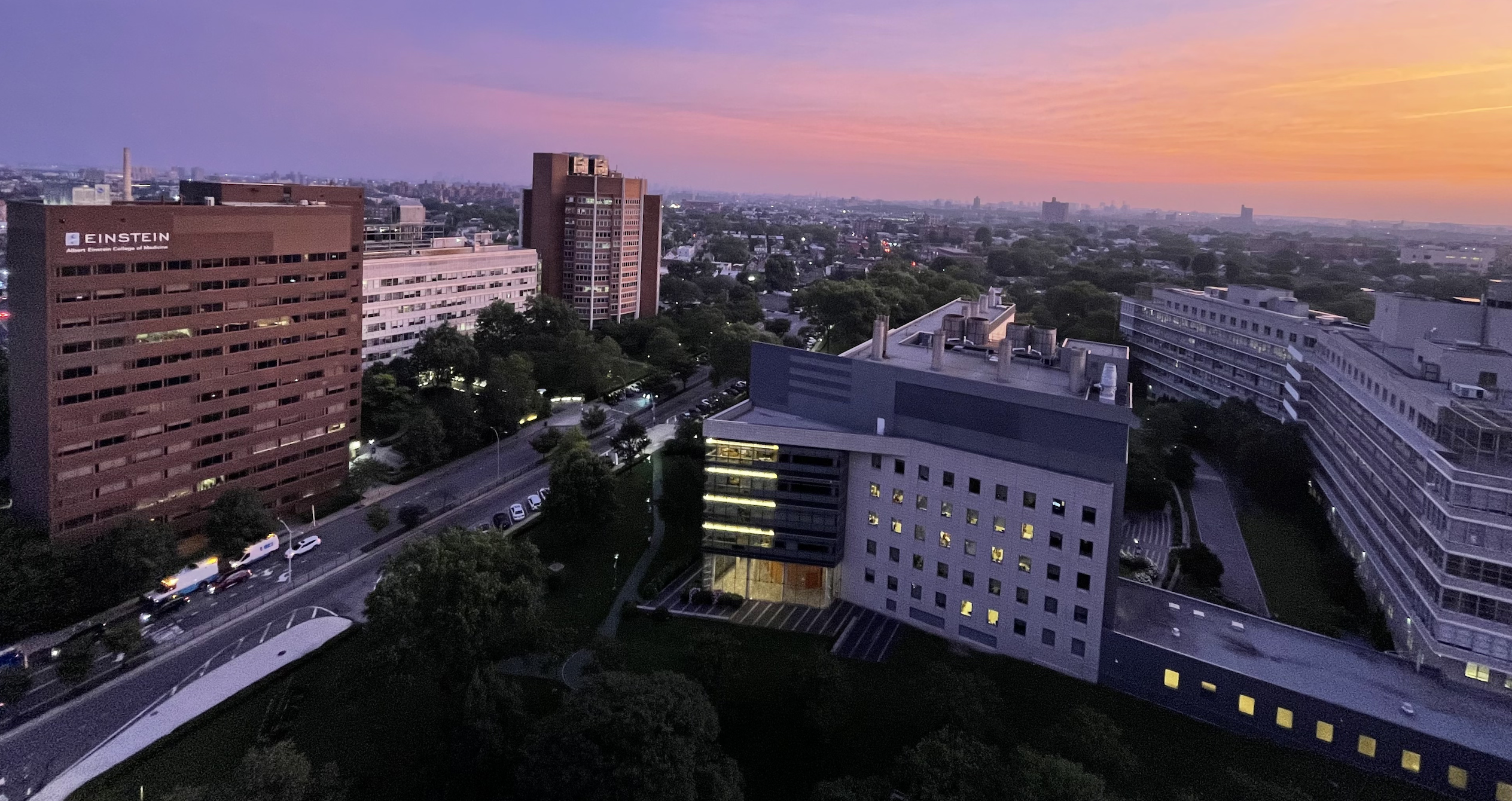
Part of the Albert Einstein College of Medicine campus

The first 16 months of the MD program, the preclerkship phase, consists of fundamental scientific and medical coursework. Multi-semester courses include bioethics and service learning. This is followed by a 12-month clinical phase that includes clerkships and preparation for and completion of the United States Medical Licensing Examination (USMLE) Step 1. Clerkships are followed by completion of the USMLE Step 2 exam. The final 18 months of medical school include clinical electives, increased clinical duties, and a research capstone project.

In addition to Jacobi and Montefiore hospitals, medical students can train in medical facilities such as the VA Bronx Healthcare System and Bronx Psychiatric Center. Students may also volunteer at the Einstein Community Health Outreach (ECHO) Free Clinic, which provides care to those without health insurance. Founded in 1999, ECHO was the first such clinic in New York City and one of the first in the United States.

=== Medical Scientist Training Program ===
Einstein hosts one of the three inaugural MSTPs launched by the National Institutes of Health (NIH) in 1964. This fully-funded dual doctoral MD/PhD program provide integrated graduate and clinical training for aspiring physician-scientists. The MSTP includes waived tuition, a stipend, subsidized housing, and a sesquiennial retreat to the Edith Macy Conference Center.

The first year of the program integrates medical school preclerkship curriculum with graduate school coursework and lab rotations. In the second year, trainees complete preclinical medical courses, take USMLE Step 1, and choose a PhD advisor based on lab rotations. Years three to five focus on PhD research, publication, and optional clinical activities, followed by intensive clinical clerkships in years six and seven after dissertation defense. While working in the lab, students engage in both pathology case studies and clinics to maintain clinical skills.

=== PhD program ===
The Graduate Division of Biomedical Sciences hosts an "umbrella" PhD program that is not confined to a specific department. In 2023, the program had 39 matriculants. Students undertake three lab rotations before selecting a mentor. A concentration in clinical investigation is offered for both PhD and MD/PhD candidates. PhD students receive full tuition remission, a stipend, and subsidized housing.

=== Master's degree programs ===
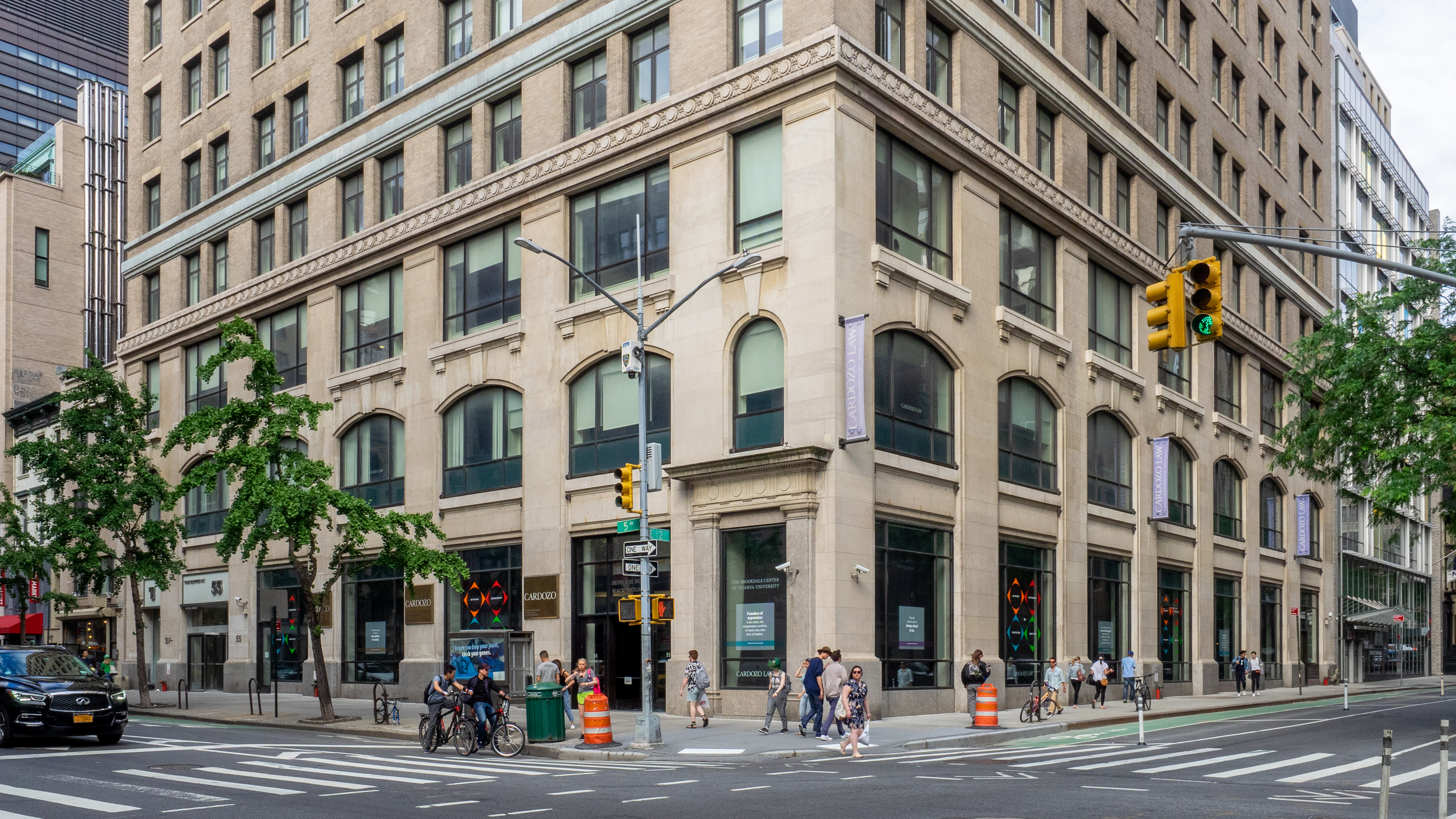
A Master of Science in Bioethics is offered with Yeshiva's Cardozo School of Law.

To provide a deeper scientific foundation for MD students, Einstein hosts the five-year Clinical Research Training Program (CRTP). The CRTP confers a Master of Science and requires an additional year of courses on clinical research methods. Students may also graduate with distinction in research for their medical degree.

With Yeshiva's Benjamin N. Cardozo School of Law, Einstein offers both a certificate and Master of Science in Bioethics. The program covers clinical bioethics consultation, healthcare ethics policy, and human subject research. Einstein also offers MD students a joint Master of Public Health degree with the City University of New York (CUNY). This Einstein-CUNY MD-MPH program lasts five years.

== Research ==
=== Research centers ===
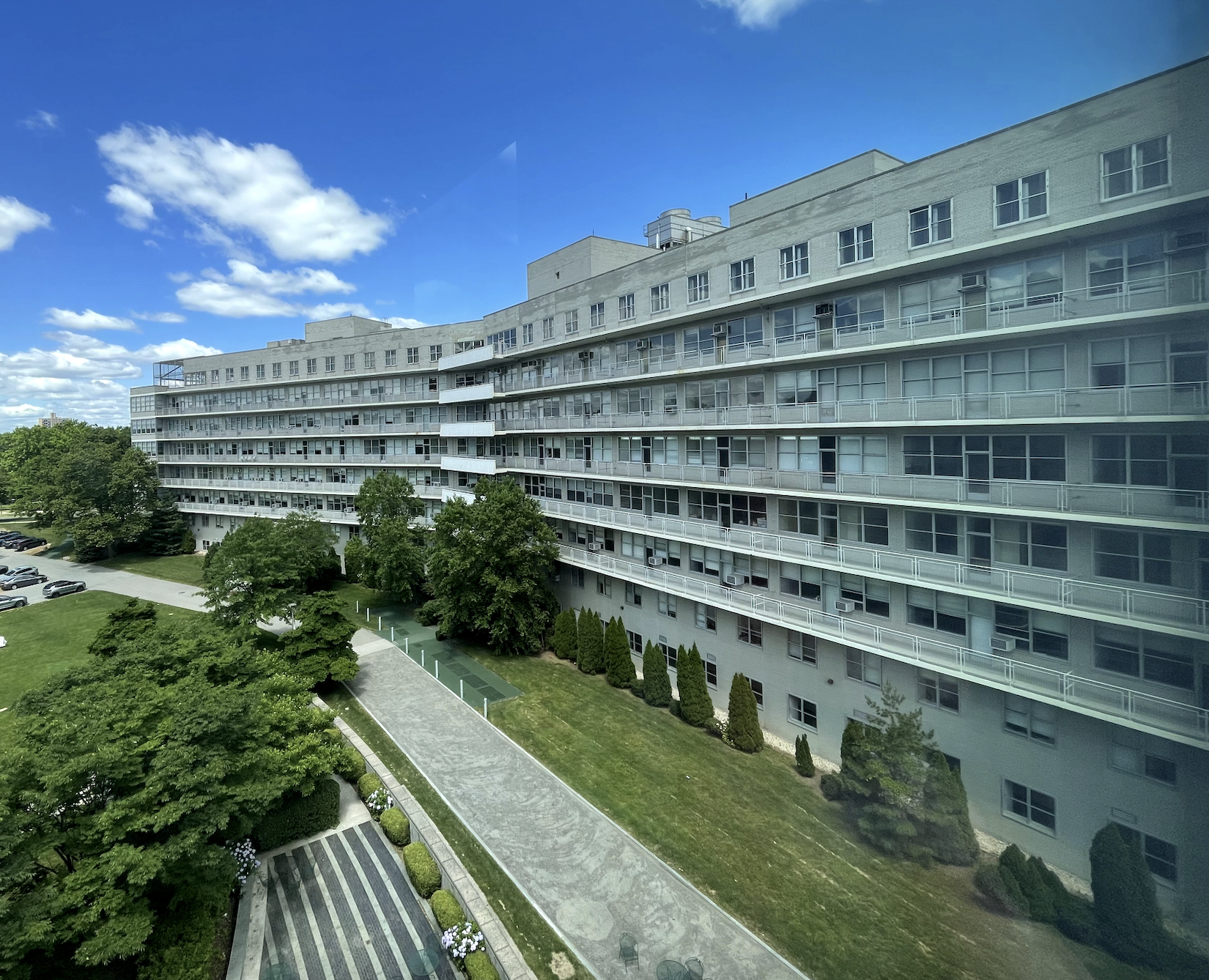
Van Etten Building

In 2024, Einstein received $192 million in funding from the NIH. The college hosts over 200 individual laboratories. NIH-designated research centers include:

- Diabetes Research Center
- Einstein-Rockefeller-CUNY Center for AIDS Research
- Harold and Muriel Block Institute for Clinical and Translational Research at Einstein and Montefiore
- Institute for Aging Research
- Montefiore Einstein Comprehensive Cancer Center
- New York Regional Center for Diabetes Translation Research
- Rose F. Kennedy Intellectual and Developmental Disabilities Research Center

=== Notable research ===
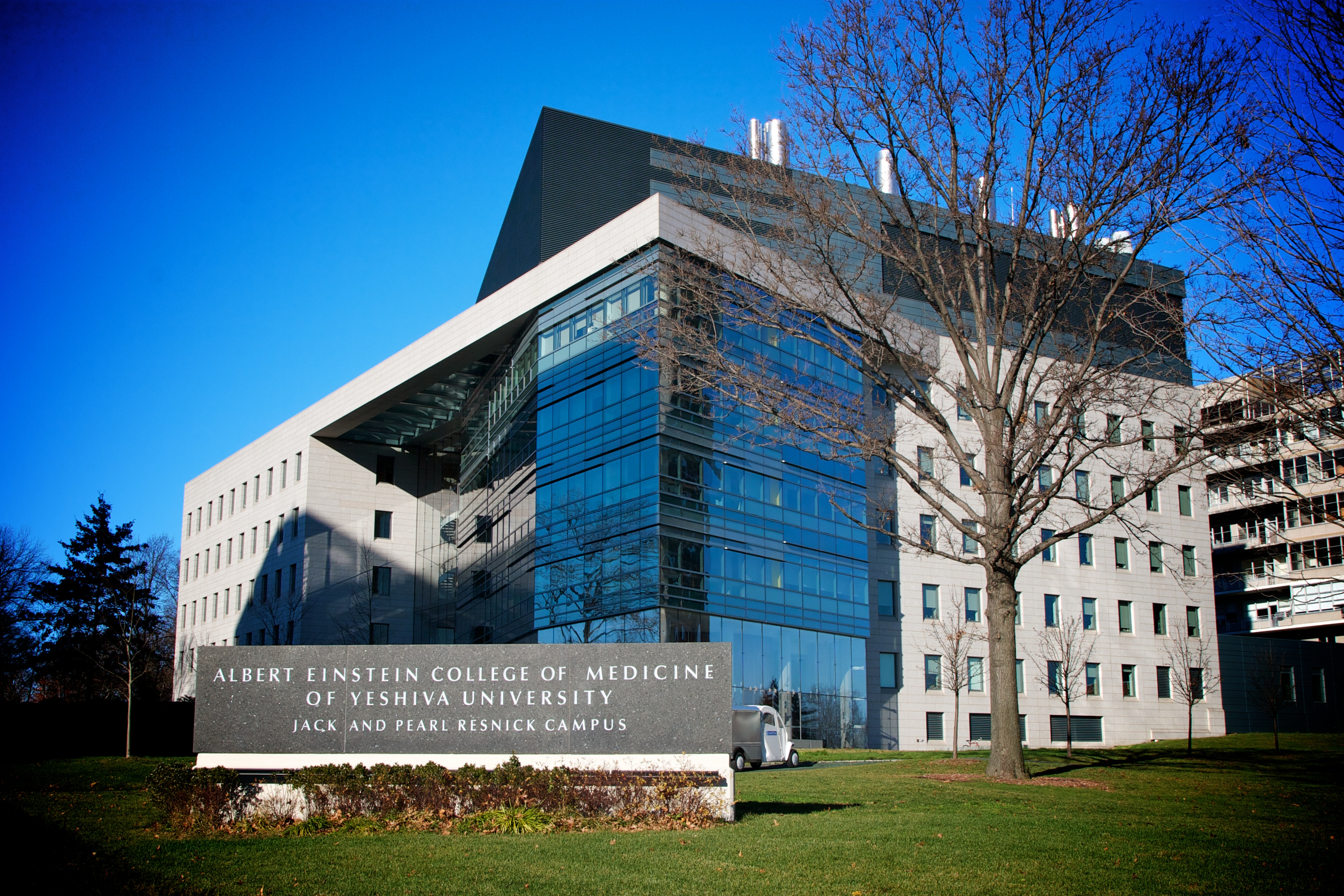
The Michael F. Price Center for Genetic and Translational Medicine and Harold and Muriel Block Research Pavilion

Notable research at Einstein includes a seminal paper that helped identify nicotine as the prime addictive component of tobacco and a series of studies that uncovered the immunological basis for transplant rejection. Thymosins were discovered in Abraham White's lab at Einstein in 1966. In 1968, after observing elevated hemoglobin A1c in a diabetes patient, Samuel Rahbar confirmed this initial finding at Einstein with Helen Ranney and first structurally characterized A1c. A1c tests are now the primary method of diabetes management. In 1979, the mechanism of taxol—one of the World Health Organization's Essential Medicines—was identified by Susan Band Horwitz at Einstein.

During the 1980s, Einstein researchers made significant discoveries on the emerging HIV/AIDS pandemic due to its high prevalence in the Bronx. These include the first description of pediatric HIV/AIDS and crucial work on mother-to-child transmission, links with substance abuse and men who have sex with men, and the role of opportunistic infections like tuberculosis. Mycobacterium—a bacterial genus that includes the species that cause tuberculosis and leprosy—was first genetically manipulated at Einstein by William Jacobs Jr. His large family of Mycobacterium strains (such as mc^{2}155) are named for Einstein's mass–energy equivalence formula: E = mc^{2}.

With Paul Alan Cox, Einstein professor Oliver Sacks proposed that Lytico-bodig disease in the Chamorro people may be caused by consumption of flying foxes that had ingested cycad neurotoxins. Faculty member Isabelle Rapin has been described as a "founding mother of autism" and popularized the term "autism spectrum disorder". In 2019, researchers at Einstein mapped the entire nervous system of Caenorhabditis elegans, a classic model organism. Other work includes the discovery of the Tc1/mariner transposon superfamily and the invention of single molecule mRNA fluorescent in situ hybridization.

== Notable people ==
=== Faculty ===
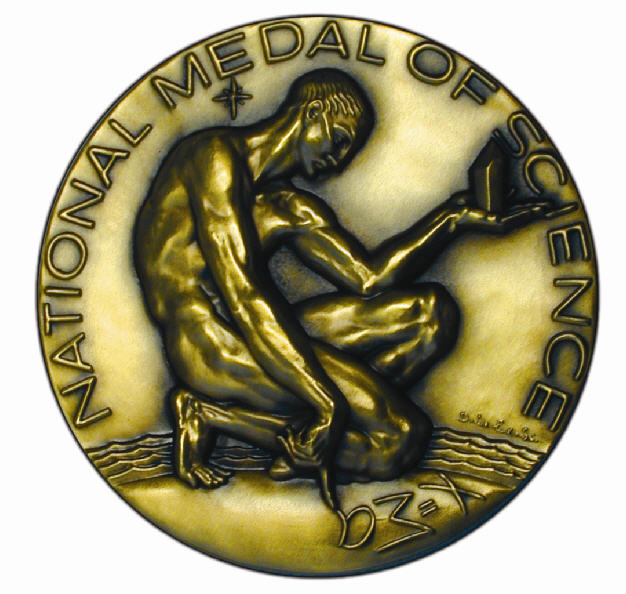
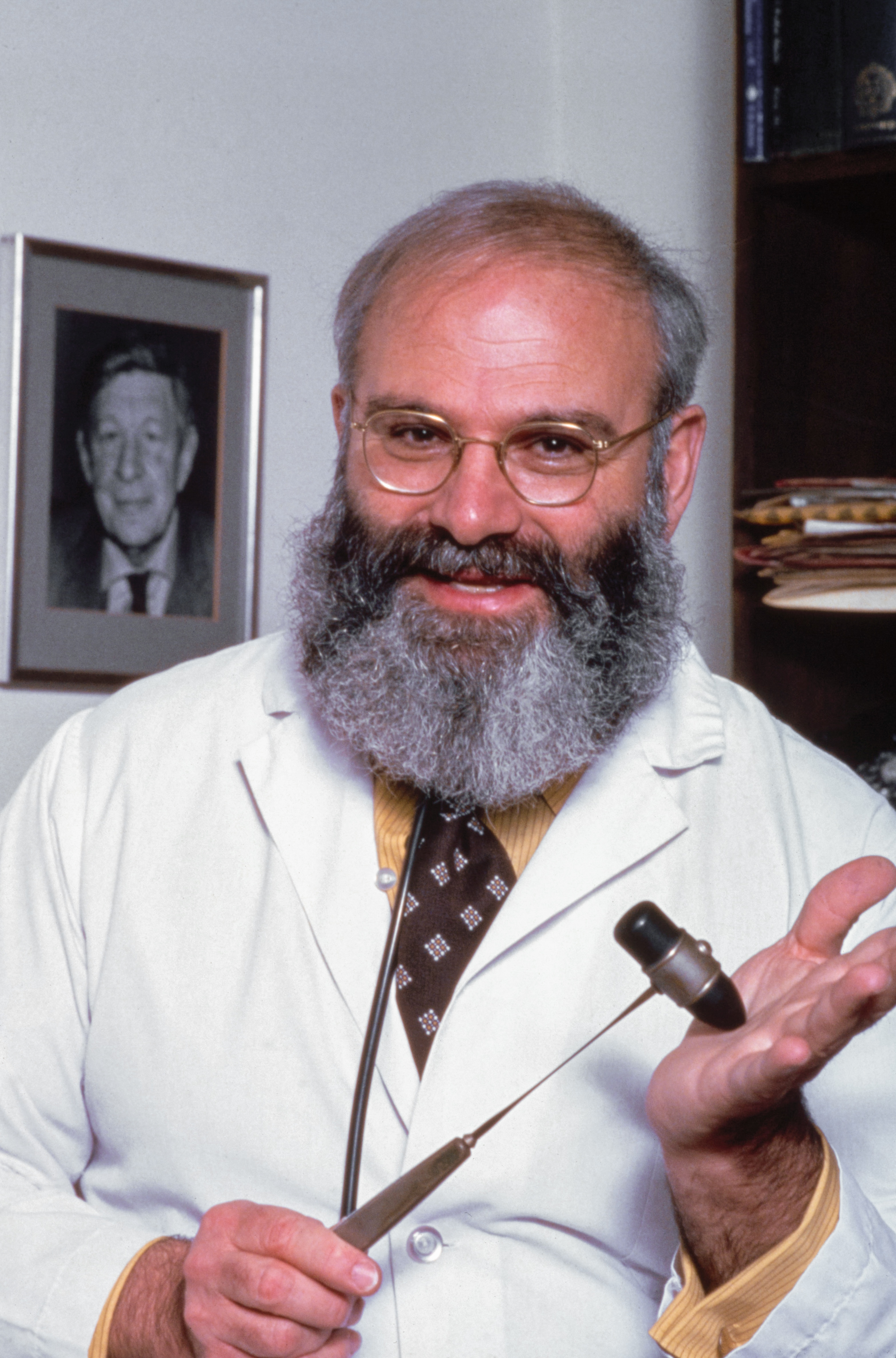
Three Einstein faculty members have been awarded the National Medal of Science, the highest science award in the United States. Neurologist and writer Oliver Sacks (right) taught at Einstein for over 40 years.

As of 2025, Einstein has over 2,000 faculty members, yielding a faculty-student ratio of 2.6:1. Faculty members that have taught or are currently teaching at Einstein include 18 members of the National Academy of Sciences and five members of the American Academy of Arts and Sciences. One faculty member—William R. Jacobs Jr.—has been a Howard Hughes Medical Investigator. Neurologist and writer Oliver Sacks taught at the college for over 40 years. His 1973 book Awakenings—documenting his work with encephalitis lethargica in the Bronx—was adapted into a 1990 film starring Robin Williams and Robert De Niro.

In 1983, professor Berta Scharrer, considered the co-founder of neuroendocrinology, was awarded the National Medal of Science for establishing the concept of neurosecretion. In 1987, professor Harry Eagle was awarded the National Medal of Science for developing Eagle's minimal essential medium (MEM), widely used for cell culture. Genetics professor Salome Gluecksohn-Waelsch was a Royal Society Fellow and received the National Medal of Science in 1993 for her fundamental research on mammalian genetics. Professor Michael Baden served as Chief Medical Examiner of New York City.

=== Alumni ===
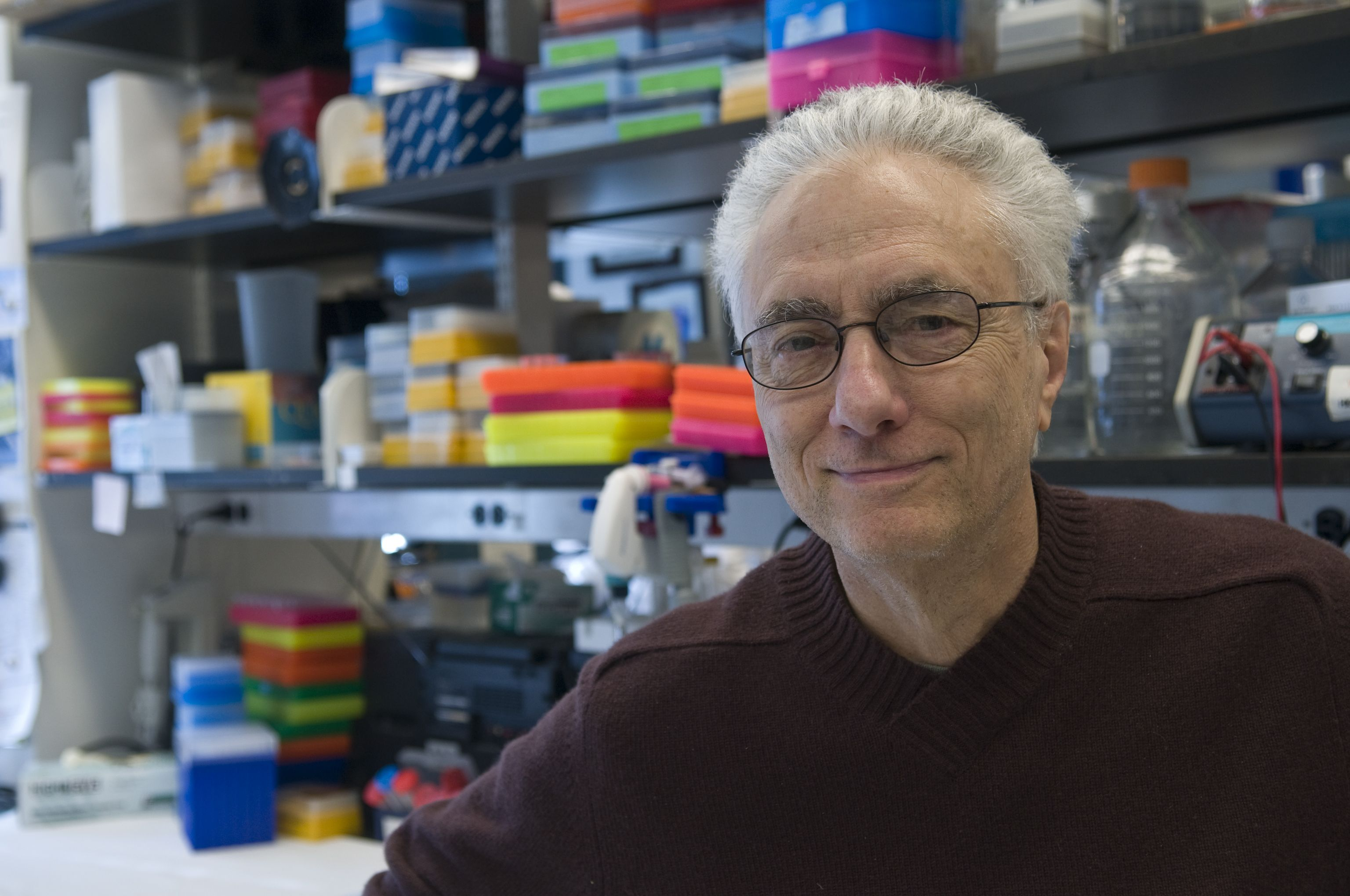
Alumnus and National Academy of Sciences member Rudolph Leibel co-discovered the hormone leptin.

Alumni of the Albert Einstein College of Medicine include seven elected members of the National Academy of Sciences, (Note: Einstein alumni who have been elected to the National Academy of Sciences include Ronald DePinho, Sankar Ghosh, Charles S. Peskin, Lucy Shapiro, Juan Carlos Saez, Sue Hengren Wickner, and Danny Reinberg.) two Howard Hughes Medical Investigators, and five American Academy of Arts and Sciences members. Einstein graduate Charles S. Peskin, who developed mathematical models for blood flow in the heart and other biological fluids, was awarded a MacArthur "genius grant" in 1983. Alumnus Lucy Shapiro was awarded the National Medal of Science in 2011 and the Lasker–Koshland Special Achievement Award in Medical Science in 2025 for her work on bacterial genetics that helped found modern developmental biology.

Scientific achievements by alumni include the co-discovery of the hepatitis C virus by George Kuo and the hormone leptin by Rudolph Leibel. Sankar Ghosh, currently a professor at Columbia University, conducted fundamental research on transcription factor NF-KB. Richard Bernstein developed blood glucose self-monitoring for diabetics. Raymond Vahan Damadian invented the nuclear magnetic resonance scanning machine and is credited by some with inventing magnetic resonance imaging (MRI) at large; for his MRI work Damadian was awarded the National Medal of Technology in 1988 and the Lemelson-MIT Program's Lifetime Achievement Award in 2001. Alumnus Ronald J. Ross first applied an MRI scanner in a clinical setting.

Notable physicians include anesthesiologist Gary Hartstein, who served as the FIA Medical Delegate for the Formula One World Championship. Psychiatrist alumnus Rick Strassman conducted seminal early work with DMT—at the time the first Food and Drug Administration-approved clinical research on psychedelics in over 20 years—and hypothesized that DMT is produced endogenously. Notable psychologist alumni include Daniel Stern, who wrote The Interpersonal World of the Infant. Other alumni include Howard Dean—governor of Vermont, 2004 presidential candidate, and Democratic National Committee chairman—and Baruch Goldstein, perpetrator of the 1994 Cave of the Patriarchs massacre.

== Notes and references ==
=== Works cited ===
==== Books ====
- Boyer, J.; Blum, H.E.; Maier, K.P.; Sauerbruch, T.; Stalder, G.A. (March 31, 2001). Liver Cirrhosis and Its Development. Springer. ISBN 9780792387602.
- Levenson, Dorothy (1984). Montefiore: The Hospital as Social Instrument, 1884-1984. Farrar, Straus & Giroux. ISBN 9780374212285.
- Shell E (January 1, 2002). The Hungry Gene: The Inside Story of the Obesity Industry. Atlantic Monthly Press. ISBN 9781422352434.

==== Journal articles ====
- "Former Fulbright Association President Highlights Importance of Planned Giving and Provides Bequest for Association" (PDF). The Fulbrighters' Newsletter. XXV (2). Fulbright Association: 10. Summer 2004. Archived (PDF) from the original on April 7, 2023.
- Fulop, Milford (2004). "The Department of Medicine at the Albert Einstein College of Medicine, 1955-1980" (PDF). Einstein Journal of Biology & Medicine. 20: 53–58.
- Haller JD, Olearchyk AS (2002). "Cardiology's 10 greatest discoveries". Texas Heart Institute Journal. 29 (4): 342–4. PMC 140304. PMID 12484626.
- Harding, Clifford; Akabas, Myles; Andersen, Olaf (2017). "History and Outcomes of Fifty Years of Physician-Scientist Training in Medical Scientist Training Programs". Academic Medicine. 92 (10): 1390–1398. doi:10.1097/ACM.0000000000001779. PMC 5617793. PMID 28658019.
- Jaffé, ER (1996). "The early history of the Albert Einstein College of Medicine". Einstein Quarterly Journal of Biology and Medicine. 13: 22–36.
- Kauffman, George (March 21, 2014). "Nobel Prize for MRI Imaging Denied to Raymond V. Damadian a Decade Ago" (PDF). The Chemical Educator. 19: 73–90. Archived from the original (PDF) on December 11, 2015.
- Spiegel, Allen (May 2008). "Albert Einstein College of Medicine". Academic Medicine. 83 (5). Association of American Medical Colleges: 524. doi:10.1097/ACM.0b013e31816bf1fd. PMID 18448914.
- Griswold, Ann (2014). "Profile of William R. Jacobs, Jr". Proceedings of the National Academy of Sciences. 111 (37): 13246–13248.
- Papaioannou, Virginia E. (2019). "Salome Gluecksohn-Waelsch. 6 October 1907—7 November 2007". Biographical Memoirs of Fellows of the Royal Society. 67: 155–171.
- Waelsch, Salome G.; Nitowsky, Harold (1990). "The Genesis of Teaching Human Genetics at Medical Schools". American Journal of Human Genetics. 46: 1222. PMC 1683846. PMID 2339713.
- Konstantinov, Igore E. (2000). "Robert H. Goetz: the surgeon who performed the first successful clinical coronary artery bypass operation". The Annals of Thoracic Surgery. 69 (6): 1966–1972. PMID 10892969.
- Gebel, Erika (2012). "The Start of Something Good: The Discovery of HbA1c and the American Diabetes Association Samuel Rahbar Outstanding Discovery Award". Diabetes Care. 35 (12): 2429–2431. doi:10.2337/dc12-1763. PMC 3507589. PMID 23173131.
- Goldstein, Allan L. (2007). "History of the discovery of the thymosins". Annals of the New York Academy of Sciences. 1112 (1): 1–13. doi:10.1196/annals.1415.045. PMID 17600284.
- Cosenza-Nashat, Melissa (2006). "Treating HIV in the Bronx and Beyond: How the Center for AIDS Research at the Albert Einstein College of Medicine and Montefiore Medical Center is Working Toward the Future". The Einstein Journal of Biology and Medicine. 22: 2–9.
- Cox, Paul Alan; Sacks, Oliver W (2002). "Cycad neurotoxins, consumption of flying foxes, and ALS-PDC disease in Guam". Neurology. 58 (6): 956–959. doi:10.1212/wnl.58.6.956. PMID 11914415.
- Plasterk, RH; Izsvák, Z; Ivics, Z (1999). "Resident aliens: the Tc1/mariner superfamily of transposable elements". Trends in Genetics. 15 (8): 326–332. doi:10.1016/S0168-9525(99)01777-1. PMID 10431195.
- Cooper, Michael (2016). "The Psychedelic Renaissance: Horizons, the Fifth Annual Conference on Psychedelic Research" (PDF). The Einstein Journal of Biology and Medicine: 36–38.

==== News articles ====
- Benjamin, Philip (March 19, 1965). "Kennedys Donate $1.4 Million For Einstein Retarded Center". The New York Times. Archived from the original on February 23, 2025.
- Cowles, Gregory (August 30, 2015). "Oliver Sacks, Neurologist Who Wrote About the Brain's Quirks, Dies at 82". The New York Times. Archived from the original on January 20, 2021.
- Hartocollis, Anemona (July 31, 2014). "Second-Chance Med School". The New York Times.
- "Einstein College in Bronx gets logo reboot". New York Daily News. November 20, 2008. Archived from the original on February 23, 2025.
- Ebert, Roger (December 20, 1990). "Awakenings". RogerEbert.com. Archived from the original on April 1, 2020.
- Wilgoren, Jodi (January 13, 2004). "The 2004 Campaign: The Ex-Governor's Wife - The Other Doctor in Dean's House Shuns Politics". The New York Times. Archived from the original on November 7, 2018.
- Mitchell, Alison (February 26, 1994). "West Bank Massacre: At Leats 40 Slain in West Bank as Israeli Fires into Mosque; Clinton Moves to Rescue Talks; A Killer's Path of Militancy: From Brooklyn to West Bank". The New York Times.
- Spurgeon, Brad (August 30, 2002). "Formula One: Grand Prix makes sure there's a doctor in the crowd". The New York Times. Archived from the original on April 21, 2024.
- Martin, Douglas (November 18, 2012). "Daniel Stern, Who Studied World of Babies, Dies at 78". The New York Times. Archived from the original on November 4, 2016.
- "Postings: Einstein Medical School; In the Bronx, New Building For Research". The New York Times. April 21, 2002. Archived from the original on May 27, 2015.
- Goldstein, Joseph (February 26, 2024). "$1 Billion Donation Will Provide Free Tuition at a Bronx Medical School". The New York Times. Archived from the original on February 26, 2024.
- "Research Center for Retarded Due; U.S. and City Backing New Einstein: College Unit". The New York Times. October 22, 1964.
- "Einstein College Opens Laboratory". The New York Times. April 29, 1964.
- "Postings: Einstein Medical School; In the Bronx, New Building For Research". The New York Times. April 21, 2002. Archived from the original on May 27, 2015.
- Solomont, E.B. (July 21, 2008). "Columbia Medical Center Recruits Yale Immunologist". The New York Sun. Archived from the original on October 19, 2019.
- "New for Einstein College; A Start on a Science Research Building". The New York Times. December 18, 1994. Archived from the original on May 26, 2015.
- Oladipo, Gloria (February 26, 2024). "$1bn donation means students at New York medical school will pay no tuition". The Guardian. Archived from the original on July 1, 2024.
- "Raymond V. Damadian". Lemelson–MIT Program. Archived from the original on November 8, 2016.
- Fines, Benjamin (March 16, 1953). "Dr. Einstein Gives Name to a College". The New York Times. Archived from the original on September 25, 2024.
- Berman, Eliza (March 14, 2016). "How Albert Einstein Celebrated His Birthday". Time.
- "3 Housing Projects Due to Go Up Here". The New York Times. June 15, 1970.
- Bryza, Christina (2024). "ECHO Anniversary: In the Room Where It Happened". Einstein Magazine. Archived from the original on December 21, 2024.
- Spiegel, Irving (March 11, 1973). "Einstein College to Mark 20 Years". The New York Times.
- Harris, Elizabeth A. (September 10, 2015). "Yeshiva University President to Step Down in 2018". The New York Times. Archived from the original on June 16, 2022.
- Slattery, Denis (May 28, 2014). "Montefiore to takeover Albert Einstein College of Medicine in the Bronx". New York Daily News. Archived from the original on August 23, 2025.
- Sheikh, Knvul (July 3, 2019). "Stored in Synapses: How Scientists Completed a Map of the Roundworm's Brain". The New York Times.
- Sandomir, Richard (June 9, 2017). "Isabelle Rapin, Who Advanced Concept of an Autism Spectrum, Dies at 89". The New York Times.
- Weber, Bruce (May 13, 2008). "Murray Jarvik, 84, Whose Research Helped Lead to Nicotine Patch, Dies". The New York Times.
- Tomasson, Robert (October 29, 1990). "Chronicles". The New York Times.
- Singer, Penny (July 18, 1993). "'Vindication' for a Diabetes Expert". The New York Times.
- "Yeshiva University 'Festschrift' Honors Albert Einstein on his 75th Birthday". The Detroit Jewish News. March 19, 1954.
- Devlin, John C. (January 4, 1966). "Einstein Hospital Opens in Bronx; Mrs. Lindsay Greets First Patient at College Center". The New York Times.
- "Cornerstone Is Laid By Einstein College For School Facility". The New York Times. October 12, 1970.
- "Einstein to Raise Output of Doctors In 3‐Year Course". The New York Times. March 26, 1971.

==== Web sources ====
- "Albert Einstein College of Medicine". US News and World Reports. Archived from the original on September 24, 2024.
- "Distinguished Scientists". Albert Einstein College of Medicine. Archived from the original on September 19, 2024.
- "Harry Eagle". National Science and Technology Medals Foundation. Archived from the original on December 8, 2024.
- "Charles S. Peskin". MacArthur Foundation.
- "Lucy Shapiro". National Science and Technology Medals Foundation. Archived from the original on December 27, 2024.
- "James J. Lyons Dinner, Yeshiva University, New York, 17 October 1955". John F. Kennedy Presidential Library and Museum. Archived from the original on January 18, 2025.
- "November 22, 2013 - Fifty years since the assassination of President John Fitzgerald Kennedy". YU News. Yeshiva University. November 19, 2013. Archived from the original on August 5, 2024.
- "Albert Einstein College of Medicine: A Brief History". Montefiore Einstein.
- "Yeshiva University's Albert Einstein College of Medicine". Yeshiva University Libraries. Yeshiva University. Archived from the original on August 6, 2024.
- "Medical Scientist Training Program: Program Description". www.einsteinmed.edu. Archived from the original on October 31, 2021.
- "Auxiliary Services". Albert Einstein College of Medicine. Montefiore Einstein. Archived from the original on December 3, 2024.
- "Moses Montefiore". British Heritage.
- "Montefiore Bronx Nurses Speak Out About Cuts to Beds and Services That Put Patient Care at Risk". New York State Nurses Association. February 28, 2025.
- "Training Locations". Albert Einstein College of Medicine. Montefiore Einstein. Archived from the original on January 1, 2025.
- "Preclerkship Phase". Albert Einstein College of Medicine. Montefiore Einstein. Archived from the original on January 1, 2025.
- "Clinical Phase". Albert Einstein College of Medicine. Montefiore Einstein. Archived from the original on March 4, 2025.
- "Einstein Secures $192 Million in NIH Grants in 2024". Montefiore Einstein Newsroom. Montefiore Einstein. December 3, 2024.
- "A Story of Discovery: Natural Compound Helps Treat Breast and Ovarian Cancers". National Cancer Institute. Archived from the original on February 25, 2025.
- "New Era of Partnership Between Yeshiva University and Montefiore Medicine". YU News. Yeshiva University. January 19, 2021. Archived from the original on July 8, 2024.
- "Albert Einstein College of Medicine Achieves Independent Degree-Granting Authority". Albert Einstein College of Medicine. March 4, 2019. Archived from the original on July 16, 2022.
- "William R. Jacobs Jr". National Academy of Sciences.
- "Einstein Appoints Dr. Jan Vijg, Expert in DNA and Longevity, to Chair of Genetics". YU News. Yeshiva University. July 14, 2008.
- "Berta Scharrer". National Science and Technology Medals Foundation. Archived from the original on January 22, 2025.
- "The A1C Test & Diabetes". National Institute of Diabetes and Digestive and Kidney Diseases. Archived from the original on February 4, 2023.
- "Scott W. Emmons". National Academy of Sciences. Archived from the original on March 28, 2025.
- "Robert H. Singer". National Academy of Sciences.
- "Program Description". Medical Scientist Training Program (MSTP). Montefiore Einstein.
- "Features". Medical Scientist Training Program (MSTP). Montefiore Einstein.
- "Housing". Medical Scientist Training Program (MSTP). Montefiore Einstein.
- "M.D. Admissions Statistics". Montefiore Einstein.
- "Academic Departments & Centers". Montefiore Einstein.
- "Einstein-Cardozo Bioethics Graduate Education". Montefiore Einstein.
- "Master Degree Programs". Montefiore Einstein. Archived from the original on October 31, 2021.
- "PhD Program". Montefiore Einstein. Archived from the original on October 31, 2021.
- "PhD Program Overview". Montefiore Einstein.
- "Ph.D. Concentration In Clinical Investigation". www.einsteinmed.edu. Montefiore Einstein. Archived from the original on July 1, 2024.
- "Einstein honors Dr. Stanley Nathenson with Marshall S. Horwitz Faculty Prize for Research Excellence". EurekAlert. American Association for the Advancement of Science. January 18, 2008.
- "Why You Should Support the Children's Hospital at Montefiore". Children's Hospital at Montefiore Einstein. Montefiore-Einstein.
- "Jacobi Fast Facts". NYC Health + Hospitals.
- "The Marilyn and Stanley M. Katz Dean". Albert Einstein College of Medicine.
- "Board of Trustees". Albert Einstein College of Medicine.
- "PhD Class Profile". Montefiore Einstein.
- "Stipend & Tuition". Montefiore Einstein.
- "Ronald A. DePinho". National Academy of Sciences.
- "Sankar Ghosh". National Academy of Sciences.
- "Charles S. Peskin". National Academy of Sciences.
- "Lucy Shapiro". National Academy of Sciences.
- "Juan Carlos Saéz". National Academy of Sciences.
- "Sue Hengren Wickner". National Academy of Sciences.
- "Danny Reinberg". National Academy of Sciences.
- "1954 Albert Einstein Award Medal, Awarded To Richard Feynman For His Work In Theoretical Physics". Sotheby's.
- "Raymond Vahan Damadian". National Science and Technology Medals Foundation.
- Malcom, Kelly (June 27, 2019). "'Mystical' Psychedelic Compound Found in Normal Brains". Michigan Medicine. University of Michigan.
- "Pioneering approach to bacterial cell biology & national leadership". Lasker Foundation.
- "Michael Baden, MD". PathAssist. American Association of Pathologists' Assistants.
- "Jacobi-Montefiore Einstein Emergency Medicine". Jacobi-Montefiore Einstein. Montefiore Medical Center.
