= Ronald J. Ross =

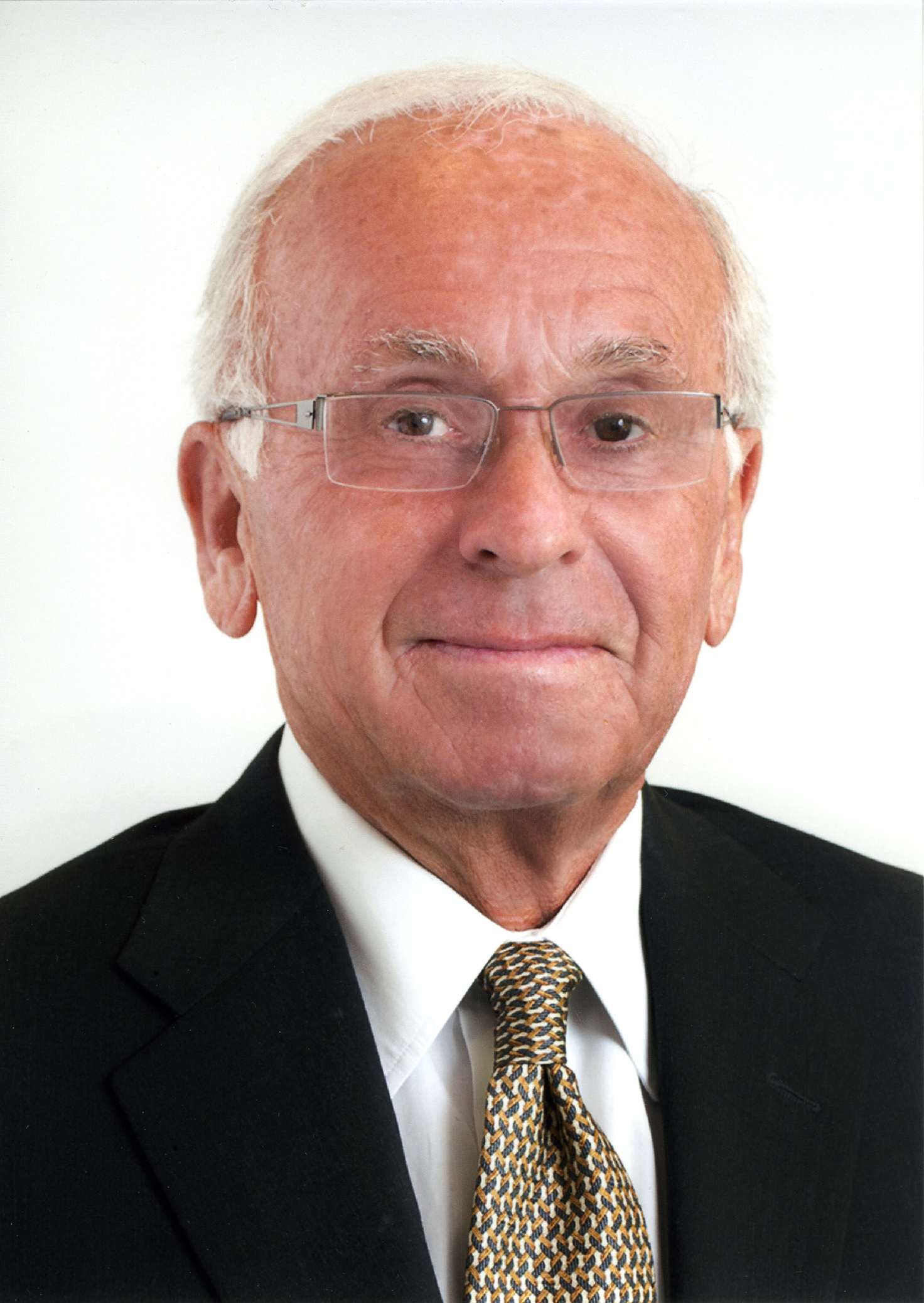
Ronald J. Ross

Ronald J. Ross is a Cleveland, Ohio radiologist known for research on brain injury in professional and amateur boxers and for the first clinical use of nuclear magnetic resonance imaging (NMR later known as MRI) on human patients. Ross is also credited with the first use of head and whole body computed tomography imaging (CT) in a private clinical setting in the United States.

== Biography ==
=== Early life and education ===
Ross is one of three children born of Lithuanian and Russian immigrants. He grew up and attended school in Cleveland Heights, Ohio. Ross earned his undergraduate degree from Case Western Reserve University in 1956 and received his medical degree from Albert Einstein College of Medicine in 1960.

=== Career ===
After completing his internship and residency in radiology in Cleveland, Ross was awarded a Fulbright scholarship and Government of Sweden Award in 1964 to complete his fellowship studies in radiology at Karolinska University Hospital. In the mid-1970s, he opened the first U.S. based private diagnostic imaging center that featured a whole body CT scanner for clinical use. In 1981, he performed the world's first MRI clinical studies on patients.

Ross's medical research includes brain damage in boxers and the MRI evaluation of diseases of the breast. Ross was as an abstractor for radiology journals. In 1983, his study of brain injuries in professional and amateur boxers was published by the Journal of the American Medical Association; the study drew global attention, stirred up controversy in the boxing world and spurred the American Medical Association to call for stricter medical supervision of the sport in the United States.

In 1998, Ross was elected to the National Fulbright Association Board of Trustees in Washington, D.C., and served as its national president from 1998 to 2000.

Ross retired from the practice of medicine in 2000 after a career that spanned 40 years. He is currently the Director Emeritus of the Department of Radiology and Chairman of the Board of Trustees at Hillcrest Hospital-Cleveland Clinic Health System and serves on the Board of Directors and Board of Trustees of the Cleveland Clinic.

=== Personal life ===
Ross is married to Helen Manas Ross and they have 3 grown children.

== Bibliography ==
- Ross, Ronald J. (June 1978). "Computed Tomography in a Private Practice Office". Radiology. 127 (3): 693–695. doi:10.1148/127.3.693. PMID 96486.
- —— (1979). "Chapter 28: Computed Tomography". In Early, Paul J.; Razzak, Muhammad Abdel; Sodee, D. Bruce (eds.). Textbook of Nuclear Medicine Technology (Third ed.). St. Louis, Missouri: C.V. Mosby Co. pp. 571–583. ISBN 978-0-8016-1488-0.
- ——; Thompson, Jay S.; Kim, Kyung H.; Bailey, Ronald A. (1982). "Nuclear Magnetic Resonance, Clinical Trials". Journal of Nuclear Medicine (Abstract).
- ——; Thompson, Jay S.; Kim, Kyung H.; Bailey, Ronald A. (April 1982). "Nuclear Magnetic Resonance Imaging and Evaluation of Human Breast Tissue: Preliminary Clinical Trials". Radiology. 143 (1): 195–205. doi:10.1148/radiology.143.1.7063727. PMID 7063727.
- ——; Thompson, Jay S.; Kim, Kyung H. (1982). "Chapter 19: N.M.R., Cleveland Experience". In Partain; James; Rollo; Price (eds.). Nuclear Magnetic Resonance (NMR) Imaging. W.B. Saunders Co.
- —— (1982). "Chapter 36: Nuclear Magnetic Resonance". In Ballinger, Philip W. (ed.). Merrill's Atlas of Roentgenographic Position and Standard Radiologic Procedures (Fifth ed.). C.V. Mosby Co. pp. 871–876. ISBN 0-8016-3408-3.
- ——; Cole, Monroe; Thompson, Jay S.; Kim, Kyung H. (January 14, 1983). "Boxers - Computed Axial Tomography, Electroencephalography and Neurological Evaluation". Journal of the American Medical Association. 249 (2): 211–213. doi:10.1001/jama.249.2.211. PMID 6848805.
- ——; Casson, Ira R.; Seigal, Ozzie; Cole, Monroe (January 1987). "Boxing Injuries: Neurologic, Radiologic and Neuropsychologic Evaluation". Clinics in Sports Medicine. 6 (1): 41–51. doi:10.1016/S0278-5919(20)31057-7. PMID 3334025.
