= Sankar Ghosh =

Indian immunologist and microbiologist

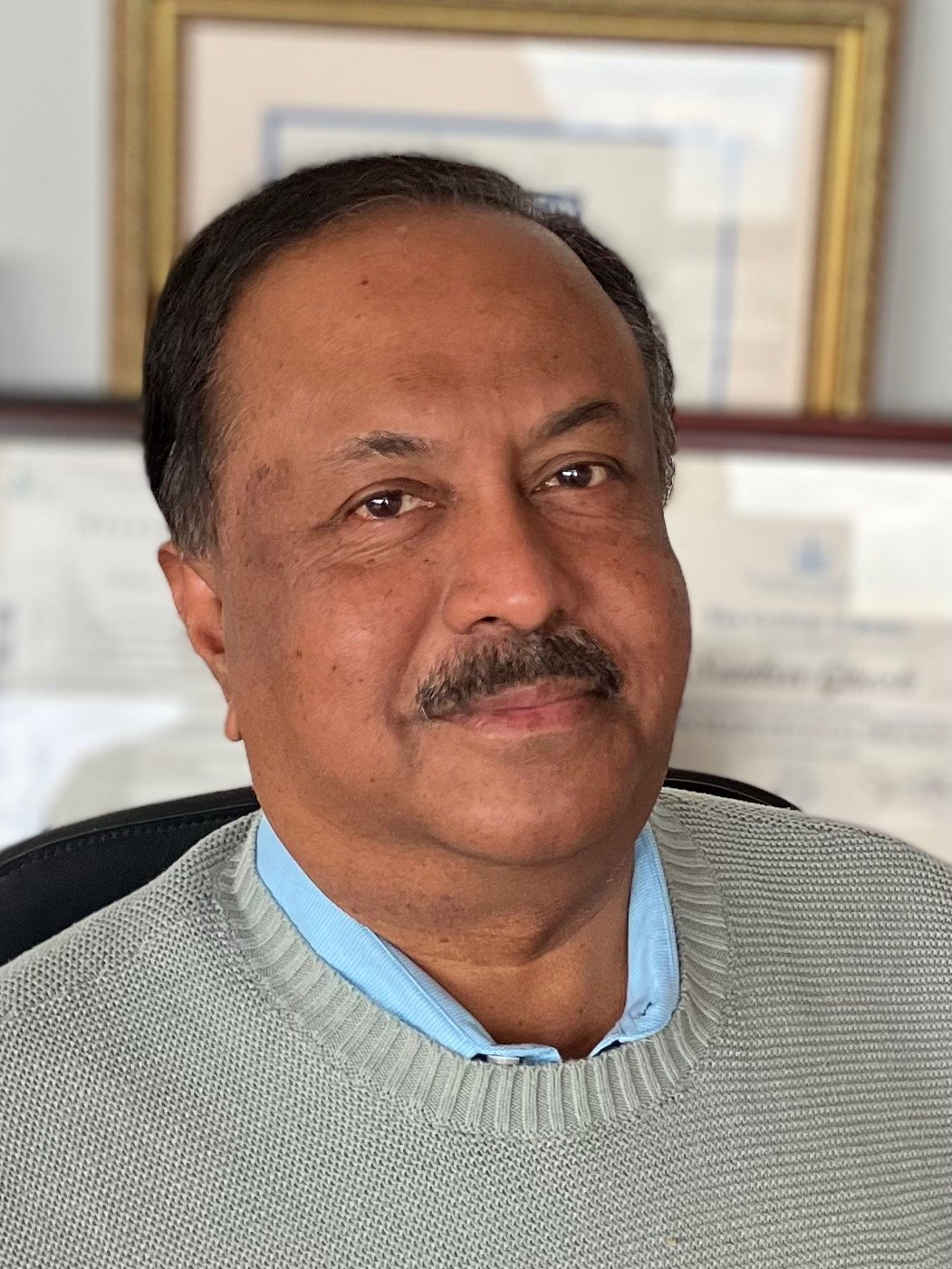
- Education: Albert Einstein College of Medicine (PhD); Whitehead Institute at MIT (Post-Doctoral Training); Calcutta University (BSc, MSc)
- Title: Chair, Department of Microbiology & Immunology at Columbia University Irving Medical Center
- Awards: Investigator, Howard Hughes Medical Institute (1991-2004); MERIT Award, National Institutes of Health (2001-2011); AAAI-Pharmigen Investigator Award (2002); Ranbaxy Science Foundation Award in Basic Medical Research (2006); F.W. Alt Award for New Discoveries in Immunology (2008); Outstanding Scientist Award, American Association for Indian Scientists in Cancer Research (2010); Professor J.J. Ghosh Memorial Award, Calcutta University (2011); Distinguished Alumni Award, Albert Einstein College of Medicine (2017); Clarivate Analytics/Web of Science Highly Cited Researcher (1999, 2022)
- Honours: Fellow, American Association for the Advancement of Science (2007); Member, National Academy of Sciences (2021); Member, National Academy of Medicine (2022); Member, American Academy of Arts & Sciences (2023)
- Website: https://www.sankarghoshlab.org

Sankar Ghosh is an Indian-American immunologist, microbiologist, and biochemist, who is the chair and Silverstein & Hutt Family Professor of the Department of Microbiology & Immunology at Columbia University Irving Medical Center. Ghosh is best known for his pioneering research on the activation of cellular responses via NF-κB, a transcription factor that plays a critical role in regulating the expression of a large number of genes involved in the mammalian immune system. Ghosh's research led to the first cloning and characterization of NF-κB and IkB proteins, including the demonstration of the role of IkB phosphorylation in the activation of NF-κB.

Over the years, Ghosh's research has been prominently published in numerous leading scientific journals. Ghosh was elected to the American Academy of Arts & Sciences in 2023, to the National Academy of Medicine in 2022, and the National Academy of Sciences in 2021. He previously was elected a Fellow of the American Association for the Advancement of Science in 2007 for his "distinguished contributions to the field of immunology, particularly for studies of the NF-kB signaling pathway."

== Education ==
Ghosh received his Ph.D. in Molecular Biology from the Albert Einstein College of Medicine in 1988. He then did his postdoctoral research training with Nobel Laureate Dr. David Baltimore at the Whitehead Institute at MIT in Cambridge, MA. Ghosh previously received his B.Sc. and M.Sc. degrees from Calcutta University in India.

While in Baltimore's lab, Dr. Ghosh began his work in understanding the regulation of NF-κB. Ghosh was instrumental in identifying, cloning and characterizing key components of the NF-κB pathway and his research led to the publication of multiple papers in leading scientific journals, including Nature, Cell, and Science.

== Career ==
After his success at the Baltimore lab, Ghosh began his independent research career at Yale University School of Medicine in 1991, serving as a professor in the Departments of Immunobiology and Molecular Biophysics & Biochemistry. At Yale, Ghosh's laboratory made numerous original findings that helped establish the mechanism of transcriptional regulation of NF-κB proteins, identification and characterization of signalling intermediates in innate and adaptive immune system, and identification and characterization of a subset of Toll-like receptors.

At Yale, Ghosh was an Investigator of the Howard Hughes Medical Institute. Ghosh was awarded the 2005 Ranbaxy Research Award in Basic Science. In 2007, Ghosh was named a Fellow of the American Association for the Advancement of Science (AAAS).

In 2008, after 17 years at Yale, Ghosh was recruited to Columbia University and the Columbia University Irving Medical Center to become the Chair of the Department of Microbiology & Immunology. At Columbia, Ghosh continued his lab's pioneering research into NF-κB while broadening the lab's focus to address a wide variety of diseases including rheumatoid arthritis, celiac disease, Alzheimer's disease, sepsis, and cancer. Major research findings by Ghosh at Columbia have included establishing a central role of c-Rel in the suppression of anti-tumour activity, identifying a variant in a non-coding RNA that may contribute to the intestinal inflammation in celiac disease, and identifying specific microRNA biomarkers that potentially indicate a strong likelihood of poor prognosis for sepsis patients.

Dr. Ghosh has served in an advisory capacity for several organizations including the Board of Scientific Counselors of the National Cancer Institute, the Scientific Review Board of the Damon Runyon Cancer Research Foundation and the Scientific Review Council of the Leukemia and Lymphoma Society. He also served as a member of the Board of Management of the National Center for Biological Sciences in Bangalore, India, as well as scientific advisory boards of Center for Life Sciences (CLS) for Peking University and Tsinghua University, Beijing, China, Shanghai Institute of Immunology, Shanghai, China, and Max-Planck Institute, Freiburg, Germany. He has served on the editorial board of multiple journals including Immunity, Molecular and Cellular Biology and the Journal of Biological Chemistry. He also served on the Life Sciences jury for the Infosys Prize in 2011.

Dr. Ghosh has been recognized for his highly cited publications as a Clarivate Analytics/Web of Science Highly Cited Researcher.

In April 2021, Ghosh was elected to the National Academy of Sciences, then in October 2022 to the National Academy of Medicine, and in April 2023 to the American Academy of Arts & Sciences.

== Bibliography ==
- Initiation factors in eukaryotic protein synthesis. Sue Golding Graduate Division of Medical Sciences, Albert Einstein College of Medicine, Yeshiva University, 1988.
- Handbook of transcription factor NF-kappaB. CRC Press, 2007. ISBN 0849327946.

== Selected publications ==
- Seeley, J.J., Baker, R.G., Mohamed, G., Bruns, T., Hayden, M.S., Deshmukh, S.D., Freedberg, D.E and Ghosh, S. (2018) Induction of innate immune memory via microRNA targeting of chromatin remodelling factors. Nature 559: 114–119.
- Grinberg-Bleyer, Y., Caron, R., Seeley, J.J., De Silva, N.S., Schindler, C.W., Hayden, M.S., Klein, U. and Ghosh, S. (2018) The alternative NF-κB pathway in regulatory T cell homeostasis and suppressive function. J. Immunol. 200: 2362–2371. (Cover article)
- Carneiro, F.R.G., Lepelley, A., Seeley, J.J., Hayden, M.S. and Ghosh, S. (2018) An essential role for ECSIT in mitochondrial complex I assembly and mitophagy in macrophages. Cell Rep. 22:2654-2666.
- Oh, H., Grinberg-Bleyer, Y., Liao, W., Maloney, D., Wang, P., Wu, Z., Wang, J., Bhatt, D.M., Heise, N., Schmid, R.M., Hayden, M.S., Klein, U., Rabadan, R., and Ghosh, S. (2017) An NF-κB transcription-factor-dependent lineage-specific transcriptional program promotes regulatory T cell identity and function. Immunity 47: 450–465.
- Grinberg-Bleyer, Y., Oh, H., Desrichard, A., Bhatt, D.M., Caron, R., Chan, T.A., Schmid, R.M., Klein, U., Hayden, M.S. and Ghosh, S. (2017) NF-κB c-Rel is crucial for the regulatory T cell immune checkpoint in cancer. Cell 170: 1096–1108.
- Dainichi, T., Hayden, M.S., Park, S.-G., Oh, H., Seeley, J.J., Grinberg-Bleyer, Y., Beck, K.M., Miyachi, Y., Kabashima, K., Hashimoto, T. and Ghosh, S. (2016) PDK1 is a regulator of epidermal differentiation that activates and organizes asymmetric cell division. Cell Rep. 15: 1–9.
- Castellanos-Rubio, A., Fernandez-Jimenez, N., Kratchmarov, R., Luo, X., Bhagat, G., Green, P.H.R., Schneider, R., Kiledjian, M., Bilbao, J.R. and Ghosh, S. (2016) A long noncoding RNA associated with susceptibility to celiac disease. Science 352: 91–95.
- Grinberg-Bleyer, Y., Dainichi, T., Oh, H., Heise, N., Klein, U., Schmid, R.M., Hayden, M.S. and Ghosh, S. (2015) Cutting edge: NF-kappaB p65 and c-Rel control epidermal development and immune homeostasis in the skin. J. Immunol. 194: 2472–2476.
- Oeckinghaus, A., Postler, T.S., Rao, P., Schmitt, H., Schmitt, V., Grinberg-Bleyer, Y., Kuhn, L.I., Gruber, C.W., Lienhard, G.E. and Ghosh S. (2014) kB-Ras proteins regulate both NF-κB-dependent inflammation and Ral-dependent proliferation. Cell Rep. 8: 1793–1807.
- Koblansky, A.A., Jankovic, D., Oh, H., Hieny, S., Sungnak, W., Mathur, R., Hayden, M.S., Akira, S., Sher, A. and Ghosh, S. (2013) Recognition of profilin by Toll-like receptor 12 is critical for host resistance to Toxoplasma gondii. Immunity 38: 119–130.
- Mathur, R., Oh, H., Zhang, D., Park, S.-G., Seo, J., Koblansky, A., Hayden, M.S. and Ghosh, S. (2012) A mouse model of Salmonella Typhi infection. Cell 151: 590–602.
- West, A.P., Brodsky, I.E., Rahner, C., Woo, D.K., Erdjument-Bromage, H., Tempst, P., Walsh, M.C., Choi, Y., Shadel, G.S. and Ghosh, S. (2011) TLR signalling augments macrophage bactericidal activity through mitochondrial ROS. Nature 472: 476–480.
- Park, S.G., Mathur, R., Long, M., Hosh, N., Hao, L., Hayden, M.S. and Ghosh, S. (2010) T regulatory cells maintain intestinal homeostasis by suppressing γδ T cells. Immunity 33: 791–803.
- Rao, P., Hayden, M.S., Long, M., Scott, M.L., Philip West, A., Zhang, D., Oeckinghaus, A., Lynch, C., Hoffmann, A., Baltimore, D. and Ghosh, S. (2010) IkBβ acts to inhibit and activate gene expression during the inflammatory response. Nature 466: 1115–1119.
- Dong, J., Jimi E., Zeiss C., Hayden M.S. and Ghosh, S. (2010) Constitutively active NF-κB triggers systemic TNFα-dependent inflammation and localized TNFα-independent inflammatory disease. Genes & Development 24: 1709–1717.
- Long, M., Park, S.-G., Strickland, I., Hayden, M.S. and Ghosh, S. (2009) Nuclear factor-kappaB modulates regulatory T cell development by directly regulating expression of Foxp3 transcription factor. Immunity 18: 921–931.
- Park, S.-G., Schulze-Luehrman, J., Hayden, M.S., Hashimoto, N., Ogawa, W., Kasuga, M. and Ghosh, S. (2009) PDK1 integrates TCR and CD28 signaling to NF-κB. Nature Immunology 10: 158–166.
- Jimi, E., Voll, R. E., Strickland, I., Long, M. and Ghosh, S. (2008) Differential role of NF-κB in selection and survival of CD4 and CD8 thymocytes. Immunity 29: 523–537.
- Dong, J., Jimi, E., Zhong, H., Hayden, M.S. and Ghosh S. (2008) Epigenetic regulation of NF-κB dependent gene expression. Genes & Development 22: 1159–1173.
- Shim, J.-H., Xiao, C., Paschal, A., Bailey, S.T., Rao, P., Hayden, M.S., Lee, K.Y., Bussey, C., Steckel, M., Tanaka, N., Akira, S., Yamada, G., Matsumoto, S. and Ghosh, S. (2005) TAK1, but not TAB1 or TAB2, plays an essential role in multiple signaling pathways in vivo. Genes & Development 19: 2668–2681.
- Yarovinsky, F., Zhang, D., Andersen, J.F., Bannenberg, G.L., Serhan, C.N., Hayden, M.S., Hieny, S., Sutterwala, F., Flavell, R. A., Ghosh, S. and Sher, A. (2005) TLR11 activation of dendritic cells by a protozoan profilin-like protein. Science 308: 1626–1629.
- Lee, K.-Y., D'Acquisto, F., Hayden, M.S., Shim, J.-H. and Ghosh, S. (2005) Protein kinase PDK1 nucleates T-cell receptor-induced signaling complex for NF-κB activation. Science 308: 114–118.
- Jimi, E., Aoki, K., Saito, H., D'Acquisto, F., May, M.J., Ichiro Nakamura, I., Sudo, T., Ohya, K. and Ghosh, S. (2004) Selective inhibition of NF-κB blocks osteoclastogenesis and prevents inflammatory bone destruction in vivo. Nature Medicine 10: 617–624.
- Zhang, D., Zhang, G., Hayden, M.S., Greenblatt, M.S., Bussey, C., Flavell, R.A. and Ghosh, S. (2004) A novel Toll-like receptor that prevents infection of kidneys by uropathogenic bacteria. Science 303: 1522–1526.
- Xiao, C., Shim, J-H., Kluppel, M., Zhang, S-M., Dong, C., Flavell, R.A., Fu, X-Y., Wrana, J. L., Hogan, B.L.M. and Ghosh, S. (2003) Ecsit is required for Bmp signaling and mesoderm formation during mouse embryogenesis. Genes & Development 17: 2933–2949.
- Zhong, H., May, M.J., Jimi, E. and Ghosh, S. (2002) Phosphorylation of nuclear NF-κB governs its association with either HDAC-1 or CBP/p300: a mechanism for regulating the transcriptional activity of NF-κB. Molecular Cell 9: 625–636.
- May, M.J., D'Acquisto, F., Madge, L.A., Gloeckner, J., Pober, J.S. and Ghosh, S. (2000) Selective inhibition of NFk-B activation by a peptide that blocks the interaction of NEMO with the IkB kinase complex. Science 289: 1550–1554.
- Voll, R.E., Jimi, E., Phillips, R.J., Barber, D.F., Rincon. M., Hayday, A.C., Flavell, R.A. and Ghosh, S. (2000) NFk-B Activation by the pre-T cell receptor serves as a selective survival signal in T lymphocyte development. Immunity 13: 677–689.
- Fenwick, C., Na, S-Y., Voll, R.E., Zhong, H., Im, S-Y., Lee, J.W. and Ghosh, S. (2000) A sub-class of Ras proteins that regulate the degradation of IkappaB. Science 287: 869–873.
- Kopp, E., Medzhitov, R., Carothers, J., Xiao, C., Douglas, I., Janeway, C.A. and Ghosh, S. (1999) ECSIT is an evolutionarily conserved intermediate in the Toll/IL-1 signal transduction pathway. Genes & Development 13: 2059–2071.
- Medzhitov, R., Kopp, E.B., Ghosh, S. and Janeway, C.A. (1998) MyD88 is a common intermediate in the IL-1 and Toll signal transduction pathways. Molecular Cell 2: 253–258.
- Zhong, H., Voll, R.E. and Ghosh, S. (1998) Phosphorylation of NF-κB p65 by PKA stimulates transcriptional activity by promoting a novel bivalent interaction with the co-activator CBP/p300. Molecular Cell 1: 661–671.
- Zhong, H., SuYang, H., Erdjument-Bromage, H., Tempst, P. and Ghosh, S. (1997) The transcriptional activity of NF-κB is regulated by IkB-associated PKAc subunit through a cyclic AMP independent mechanism. Cell 89: 413–424.
- Beg, A.A., Sha, W.C., Bronson, R.T., Ghosh, S. and Baltimore, D. (1995) Embyronic lethality and liver degeneration in mice lacking the RelA component of NF-κB. Nature 376: 167–170.
- Ghosh, G., Van Duyne, G., Ghosh, S. and Sigler, P.B. (1995) Structure of NF-kappa B p50 homodimer bound to a kappa B site. Nature 373: 303–310.
- Thompson, J.E., Phillips, R.J., Erdjument-Bromage, H., Tempst, P. and Ghosh, S. (1995) IkB-ß regulates the persistent response in a biphasic activation of NFk-B. Cell 80: 573–582.
- Kopp, E. and Ghosh, S. (1994) Inhibition of NF-κB by sodium salicylate and aspirin. Science265: 956–959.
- Davis, N.*, Ghosh, S.*, Simmons, D.L., Tempst, P., Liou, H.C., Baltimore, D. and Bose, H.R. Jr. (1991) Rel-associated pp40 (IkappaB alpha): an inhibitor of the rel family of transcription factors. Science 253: 1268–1271. (*equal contribution)
- Nolan, G.P., Ghosh, S., Liou, H.C., Tempst, P. and Baltimore, D. (1991) DNA binding and I kappa B inhibition of the cloned p65 subunit of NF-kappa B, a rel-related polypeptide. Cell64: 961–969.
- Ghosh, S., Gifford, A.M., Riviere, L.R., Tempst, P., Nolan, G.P. and Baltimore, D. (1990) Cloning of the p50 DNA binding subunit of NF-kappa B: homology to rel and dorsal. Cell 62: 1019–1029.
- Ghosh, S. and Baltimore, D. (1990) Activation in vitro of NF-kappa B by phosphorylation of its inhibitor I kappa B. Nature 344: 678–682.
