= Paula Tallal =

American neuroscientist

- Born: 1947
- Education: New York University (B.A.) 1969, Cambridge University,England (Ph.D.) 1973
- Occupation: Professor
- Employer: Rutgers University
- Known for: Co-director of the Center for Molecular and Behavioral Neuroscience (CMBN)
- Notable work: Co-founded the Scientific Learning Corporation, Producer of the educational software Fast ForWord, Publication of over 150 papers on the topic of language and learning.
- Awards: Women of Influence Award (2003) Board of Governors Professor of Neuroscience Award (2000)

Paula Tallal (born 1947) is a Rutgers Board of Governors Professor of Neuroscience and co-director of the Center for Molecular and Behavioral Neuroscience (CMBN) at Rutgers University in Newark, New Jersey. Tallal is a participant on scientific advisory boards and government committees for both learning disabilities and developmental language disorders.

== Research ==
In 1996, Tallal co-founded the Scientific Learning Corporation, the producer of the educational software Fast ForWord. Considered an expert in phonological processing, her research into dyslexia and other word encoding disorders has led to the publication of over 150 papers on the topic of language and learning.

== Awards ==
- Co-Director Education and Outreach, Temporal Dynamic of Learning Center, National Science Foundation, 2006–2008

- Co-Principal Investigator, Santa Fe Institute Consortium, "Increasing Human Potential Initiative," 2002-2005.

- Presidential Symposium Speaker, Society for Neuroscience

- Women of Influence Award, NJBIZ, 2003

- Board of Governors Professor of Neuroscience Award, 2000

== Education ==
B.A. New York University, 1969

Ph.D. Cambridge University, England 1973

== Resources ==
Rutgers Women in Science, Engineering, and Mathematics
