= Fast ForWord =

Fast ForWord is a computer-based reading program with limited evidence of effectiveness, created by Scientific Learning Corporation. It is based on a theory about the cognitive abilities of children with language and literacy learning difficulties.

== Research ==
A systematic review which focused on high quality randomised controlled trials did not find any positive benefit of the intervention. A more general review of "Brain Training" programs noted:

In summary, the evidence cited by Scientific Learning Corporation provides little compelling evidence for the effectiveness of Fast ForWord as a tool to improve language processing or other aspects of cognition. Studies showing benefits typically included interventions that lacked any control group, and those with a control comparison group generally showed little evidence for differential improvements. The only randomized controlled trial provided no evidence for differential improvements, even on measures tapping similar aspects of auditory language processing.

The research literature on Fast ForWord was reviewed by What Works Clearinghouse, an initiative of the U.S. Department of Education’s Institute of Education Sciences. Positive effectiveness ratings and improvement indices were found for alphabetics, reading fluency, comprehension, and English language development. However, the quality of evidence included in these reviews has come under criticism, as it included reports that had not undergone peer review and that were produced by the company marketing the intervention.

== History ==
The Fast ForWord products evolved from the theory of a number of scientists, including Michael Merzenich, Bill Jenkins, Paula Tallal, and Steven L Miller. This team started the Scientific Learning Corporation in 1996. The company created Fast ForWord. The theory was that some children who have language and literacy learning difficulties may have problems rapidly processing sounds, a following theory that cognitive training can improve auditory processing, and a final theory that this training will generalize to improve learning skills beyond those in the training tasks. Despite this, the program has not demonstrated an ability to improve learning skills.
