= Isabelle Rapin =

Autism researcher

- Born: December 4, 1927; Lausanne, Switzerland
- Died: May 24, 2017 (aged 89); Rhinebeck, New York
- Spouse: Harold Oaklander

Academic background
- Education: University of Lausanne

Academic work
- Discipline: Neurology; Pediatrics
- Institutions: Bellevue Hospital, Albert Einstein College of Medicine

Isabelle Juliette Martha Rapin, M.D. (December 4, 1927 – May 24, 2017), was a professor of both Neurology and Pediatrics at the Albert Einstein College of Medicine in New York City. She was a leading authority on autism for decades, and a fellow of the American Academy of Neurology.

== Personal life and education ==
Rapin was born in Lausanne, Switzerland; her mother was from Connecticut, and her father was Swiss. As a child, she was an avid reader, and a Girl Scout who attended all-girls' schools between the ages of 9 and 19. Surrounded by a family of scientists, she decided to become a physician before she was ten years old.

She studied at the University of Lausanne Medical School in 1946, in a class of around 100 students that included about a dozen women. She decided to become a pediatric neurologist in 1951 after she spent twelve weeks at Pitié-Salpêtrière Hospital and at the Hôpital des Enfants Malades in Paris. When she graduated from Lausanne Medical School in 1952, there were few paying jobs in Switzerland, so she applied to the United States to Harvard, Yale, Johns Hopkins and Bellevue Hospital. She immigrated to the United States in 1953 after being offered a position in pediatrics at Bellevue to begin in July. In 1952, she received a Swiss Federal Diploma in Medicine. She received her M.D. in 1955, when her thesis was published in the Swiss Archives of Neurology and Psychiatry.

She met her husband, Harold Oaklander, in August 1958, and they were married in the spring of 1959. Of her husband, she said: "Without his unselfish and sustained encouragement and help, his willingness to share in all household and child-rearing jobs (except for car maintenance, his, and sewing, mine), I could never have flourished in child neurology as I did." Her husband finished his Ph.D. at Columbia University, but knew she would not leave the Albert Einstein College of Medicine, so he accepted a "less prestigious" job nearby. They had four children: two daughters and two sons.

== Career ==
Rapin interned in pediatrics at New York City's Bellevue Hospital, and did her residency in neurology at the Neurological Institute at Columbia-Presbyterian Hospital, where she also completed a year of fellowship. She joined the Albert Einstein College of Medicine faculty in 1958 and retired at the age of 84 in 2012. Of the developments in the field of autism during those years, Rapin said, "Especially in the days before autism was all over the Internet and print media, parents who came for advice were most likely to report problems with language ... These days, Internet-savvy parents worry about autism but do not always tell me their concerns when they visit my office, because they want to hear my independent diagnosis."

Rapin said, "My interest in language disorders and autism was enhanced by the arrival at Einstein of Dr. Doris A. Allen, whose background was developmental psycholinguistics, psychology, and speech pathology ... After evaluating hundreds of autistic children, I became convinced that the report by one third of parents of autistic preschoolers of a very early language and behavioral regression is real and deserving of biologic investigation."

=== Appointments ===
Rapin helped found the Child Neurology Society and the International Child Neurology Association. At Einstein, she founded the Child Neurology Service and Fellowship Program.

She served on the boards of the Child Neurology Society, the International Child Neurology Association, the American Academy of Neurology and the International Neuropsychology Society.

== Recognition and other achievements ==
The Boston Globe said in 1992 that Rapin was "a specialist in neurological diseases of children [who] discovered several such diseases and also is a leading authority on autism". The New York Times said: "Considered by many the doyenne of autism, Dr. Rapin has spent decades studying the disability."

Albert Einstein College of Medicine said that Rapin was "a leader in the field of child neurology ... credited with a number of discoveries in the field of neurogenetic disorders in childhood, including shaping our understanding of autism ... In addition to her renown as a 'mother of autism,' she has been called 'a luminary in her field' and 'always the guiding light'." To honor Rapin, in 2012, Einstein established an annual conference on communication disorders. According to colleague Mark Mehler, M.D., "She is the world's expert in the field of pediatric communication disorders, and during her career she defined as well as refined our understanding of an entire field." In 2006, Einstein held an international symposium on autism honoring Rapin.

Rapin's awards and recognition included:

- President's Award from the American Academy of Neurology
- Honorary Alumna status from the Albert Einstein College of Medicine
- Award for Excellence in Autism Research from the Autism Society of America
- Shriver Center Award

In an autobiography published in the Journal of Child Neurology, Rapin said:

"The message I would give a young colleague is that child neurology is a wonderfully rewarding field, intellectually and personally, because of the families you will meet. In order to have it all, that is, be married, have children, restore and furnish an antique house, work in the garden, enjoy a lot of what life offers, and have a great job, you need a supportive and generous mate, adequate baby sitting and house help, flexibility, good humor, and a nose for the unusual. Consider every patient a potential source of new knowledge, describe what you see, pursue your interests vigorously, and learn to cut corners and prioritize. Find a good mentor, enjoy what you do, and be lucky."

== Publications ==
As of 2006, Rapin had published more than 135 papers and 75 book chapters; some of her books were:

- Tuchman R, Rapin I (2006). Autism: A Neurological Disorder of Early Brain Development. MacKeith Press. ISBN 978-0444503633.
- Riva D, Rapin I, Zardini G (2006). Language: Normal and Pathological Development. John Libbey Eurotext Ltd. ISBN 978-2472006384.
- Rapin I (1996). Preschool Children with Inadequate Communication. MacKeith Press. ISBN 978-1898683070.
- Rapin I (1994). Handbook of Neuropsychology. Vol. 6. Elsevier Science Ltd. ISBN 978-0444820600.
- Rapin I (1982). Children with Brain Dysfunction: Neurology, Cognition, Language, and Behavior. Raven Press. ISBN 978-0890048443.
- Haas RH, Rapin I, Moser HW (1988). Rett Syndrome and Autism. Year Book Medical Pub. ISBN 978-9990808179.
