= Laboratory rotation =

Laboratory rotations are typically a part of first year graduate school (Ph.D.-oriented) in American universities, especially in the research-oriented areas like biology and chemistry where an incoming student is expected to work in 4 to 6 different laboratories (each is called a "rotation") for durations of about 6 to 8 weeks, before making a final decision regarding which group he or she wishes to join.

Laboratory rotations are uncommon in the British university system, where a Ph.D. candidate is accepted into a laboratory soon after joining, and that is partly responsible for shorter duration needed for graduating.
