= Social interaction approach =

Theory of language development

The Social interaction approach (SIA) or interactionist approach is a theory of language development that combines ideas from sociology and biology to explain how language is developed. This theory posits that language emerges from, and is dependent upon, social interaction. The social interaction approach asserts that if our language is developed out of a desire to communicate within our environment, then that environment will dramatically determine how quickly and efficiently we learn to communicate. With this approach, language is viewed as having its origins in social exchange and communication relating it closely to interactionism in sociology. The theory begins with the earliest stages of infancy, looking at the way children communicate and interact with caregivers as a means of achieving motives and generating contact. As children develop, they learn language skills derived from, and suited to their environment. Caregiver's attitudes and attentiveness to their children are important to promoting an environment of productive language learning habits. Much of this approach is derived from the work and theories of Lev Vygotsky.

The Social interaction approach is a type of brief therapy. It is characterized by the client being in charge of the therapy session as the counselor acts as a mediator. It is based on socio-communicative functions. It is useful in language advancement, where children cue their parents to supply appropriate language experiences. SIA provides efficient social communication at any point in child development.
