= California Assembly Bill 1066 (2016) =

Bill in California

California State Legislature
- Full name: Assembly Bill 1066
- Introduced: February 26, 2016
- Assembly voted: June 2, 2016; August 29, 2016
- Senate voted: August 22, 2016
- Signed into law: September 12, 2016
- Sponsor(s): United Farm Workers
- Governor: Jerry Brown

Status: Current legislation

California's Assembly Bill 1066, Phase-In Overtime for Agricultural Workers Act of 2016, was authored by Assemblymember Lorena Gonzalez Fletcher and was signed by Governor Jerry Brown on September 12, 2016. This bill allows farmworkers in California to qualify for overtime pay after working 8 hours in a single day or 40 hours in a workweek. Prior to the passage of AB 1066, farmworkers were only eligible for overtime pay after working 10 hours.

== Background ==
In 1938, Congress passed the Fair Labor Standards Act (FLSA). The FLSA set the minimum baseline requirements for labor laws in the United States in regards to minimum wage, overtime pay, recordkeeping, and child labor standards. The standards were meant to encompass employees in the private sector as well as in the Federal, State, and local governments. Agricultural workers were exempted from the overtime provisions of the FLSA, but each individual state was left with the discretion to exceed the requirements established by the FLSA.

In 1941 the California Legislature voted to exempted all agricultural employees from the statutory requirements of overtime, therefore codifying the exclusion of agricultural workers from the overtime protections of the FLSA. When the 8-hour day was codified in 1999, the statutory exemption for agricultural workers remained in place. Therefore, agricultural workers did not receive overtime pay until working over 10 hours in a single day and more than six days during a workweek.

== The State of California Law Prior to the Passage of AB 1066 ==
California Labor Code §510 defines a full work day as 8 hours and a full work week as 40 hours a week. With some exceptions overtime compensation is required for any work in excess of 8 hours in one workday and any work in excess of 40 hours per work week. However, Labor Code §554 exempts any person employed in an agricultural occupation for the provisions laid out in Labor Code §510. Labor Code §516 establishes the Industrial Welfare Commission (IWC) to adopt or amend working condition orders with respect to break periods, meal periods, and days of rest for any workers in the State consistent with the health and welfare of those workers.

Under Wage Order 14 of the Industrial Welfare Commission employees working in an agricultural occupation are entitled to overtime compensation for any work in excess of 10 hours in one workday or more than 6 days in any workday, and the first 8 hours of the 7th days much be paid at 1 1/2 times the employee's regular rate. Additionally, all hours worked over 8 on the 7th day of work must be paid at double the employee’s regular rate of pay.

== Comparison by Occupation of Overtime Provisions Prior to AB 1066 ==
Pay Overtime Equal to 1 1/2 times regular pay:

- For most occupations, all hours over 8 hours in one day or 40 in one week.
- For farmworkers, all hours over 10 in one day and 60 in one week.

== Assembly Floor Debate ==
Joint Rule 54(c) Controversy :

During the Floor Debate for AB 1066 Assemblymember Wagner raised a point of order claiming that Assemblymember Gonzalez had violated Joint Rule 54(c). Assemblymember Wagner claimed that in accordance with Joint Rule 54(c), a member may not bring up a bill that is substantially similar to a bill that was brought up earlier that same session. Assemblymember Wagner claimed that AB 1066 was virtually identical to AB 2757 and therefore violated Joint Rule 54(c). However, Speaker Pro Tempore Mullin ruled against the point of order stating that Joint Rule 54(c)"states that no Member may author a bill that has substantially the same effect as a bill that he or she previously introduced during that Session; the argument does not apply to the bill before the Body when compared to the introduced version of the original bill, Assembly Bill No. 2757." Assemblymember Wagner appealed the decision of the chair, and a vote was conducted to see if the decision of the chair should be overturned. By a vote of 49-26, the Assembly ruled to sustain the decision of the chair, therefore, defeating Assemblymember Wagner's appeal.

== Assembly Floor Vote ==
=== First Assembly Floor Vote: August 29, 2016 ===
==== Ayes: 44 Noes: 32 NVR: 4 ====
Ayes: Alejo, Arambula, Atkins, Bloom, Bonilla, Bonta, Brown, Burke, Calderon, Campos, Chau, Chiu, Chu, Dababneh, Daly, Cristina Garcia, Eduardo Garcia, Gatto, Gipson, Gomez, Gonzalez, Gordon, Roger Hernández, Holden, Jones-Sawyer, Linder, Lopez, Low, McCarty, Medina, Mullin, Nazarian, O'Donnell, Quirk, Ridley-Thomas, Rodriguez, Salas, Santiago, Mark Stone, Thurmond, Ting, Weber, Williams, Rendon

Noes: Achadjian, Travis Allen, Baker, Bigelow, Brough, Chang, Chávez, Cooley, Cooper, Dahle, Dodd, Frazier, Beth Gaines, Gallagher, Gray, Grove, Hadley, Harper, Jones, Kim, Lackey, Maienschein, Mathis, Mayes, Melendez, Obernolte, Olsen, Patterson, Steinorth, Wagner, Waldron, Wilk

No Votes Recorded: Eggman, Irwin, Levine, Wood

=== Second Assembly Floor Vote (Concurrence): June 6, 2016 ===
==== Ayes: 54 Noes: 25 NVR: 1 ====
Ayes: Alejo, Bloom, Bonilla, Bonta, Brown, Burke, Calderon, Campos, Chau, Chiu, Chu, Cooley, Cooper, Dababneh, Daly, Dodd, Eggman, Frazier, Cristina Garcia, Eduardo Garcia, Gatto, Gipson, Gomez, Gonzalez, Gordon, Gray, Roger Hernández, Holden, Irwin, Jones-Sawyer, Levine, Linder, Lopez, Low, McCarty, Medina, Mullin, Nazarian, O'Donnell, Perea, Quirk, Rendon, Ridley-Thomas, Rodriguez, Salas, Santiago, Mark Stone, Thurmond, Ting, Waldron, Weber, Williams, Wood, Atkins

Noes: Achadjian, Travis Allen, Baker, Bigelow, Brough, Chang, Dahle, Beth Gaines, Gallagher, Grove, Hadley, Harper, Jones, Kim, Lackey, Maienschein, Mathis, Mayes, Melendez, Obernolte, Olsen, Patterson, Steinorth, Wagner, Wilk

No Votes Recorded: Chávez

== Senate Floor Vote ==
=== Ayes: 21 Noes: 14 NVR: 4 ===
Ayes: Allen, Beall, Block, De León, Hall, Hancock, Hernandez, Hertzberg, Hill, Hueso, Jackson, Lara, Leno, Liu, Mendoza, Mitchell, Monning, Pan, Pavley, Wieckowski, Wolk

Noes: Anderson, Bates, Berryhill, Cannella, Fuller, Gaines, Glazer, Huff, Moorlach, Morrell, Nguyen, Nielsen, Stone, Vidak

No Votes Recorded: Galgiani, Leyva, McGuire, Roth

== How AB 1066 Changed California Law ==
AB 1066, the Phase-In Overtime for Agricultural Workers Act of 2016, will eliminate the current exemption for agricultural workers from California's overtime requirements over four years. The bill implements a four-year phase in for overtime compensation for agricultural workers. AB 1066 will decrease the current 10-hour overtime requirement for agricultural workers by 30 minutes over a span of four years, until eventually leading agricultural workers to receive overtime pay after working over than 8 hours in a single day and 40 hours in a workweek. The bill would provide employers who employ 25 or fewer employees an additional 3 years to comply with the phasing in of these overtime requirements. Specifically, AB 1066 amended §554 of the California Labor Code and added Chapter 6 (beginning with §857) to the California Labor Code. The additional language to the Labor Code instructs the Department of Industrial Relations to update Wage Order 14-2001 to be consistent with the aforementioned provisions of overtime wage compensation for agricultural workers.

== Arguments in Support ==
Supporters of AB 1066 argue that the California agriculture industry is well-developed and wealthy, and continues to benefit from an unfair exclusionary overtime subsidy at the expense of agricultural workers. In 2014, the California Department of Food and Agriculture found that the state’s over 76,000 farms had combined revenue of approximately $54 billion, while agricultural workers farmworkers earn an annual average salary of $14,000 and roughly 30% of farmworkers live in households that are below the poverty line. According to the United Farm Workers(UFW), the sponsors of the bill, the initial exclusion of farmworkers from the wage protections and maximum hour requirements set out in the Fair Labor Standards Act is part of our "country's shameful legacy that initially targeted African Americans who were farmworkers in the 1930s.

Supporters of the Bill:

- United Farm Workers
- California State Treasurer John Chiang
- Alameda Labor Council
- Alliance San Diego
- American Civil Liberties Union of California
- American Federation of State, County and Municipal Employees Amigos de los Rios
- Asian Americans Advancing Justice-California
- Audubon California
- Azul
- California Catholic Conference
- California Coastal Protection Network
- California Employment Lawyers Association
- California Environmental Justice Alliance
- California Immigrant Policy Center
- California Labor Federation
- California League of Conservation Voters
- California Rural Legal Assistance Foundation
- California Teachers Association
- Center for Biological Diversity
- Center for Environmental Health
- Center on Race, Poverty & the Environment
- Coalition for Humane Immigrant Rights of Los Angeles
- Coastal Environmental Rights Foundation
- Committees for Land, Air, Water and Species
- Consumer Attorneys of California
- Courage Campaign
- Dolores Huerta Foundation
- Don Saylor, Yolo County Supervisor
- Endangered Habitats League
- Environment California
- Environmental Center of San Diego
- Equality California
- Farmworker Justice
- Food Empowerment Project
- Kern, Inyo, and Mono Counties Central Labor Council
- La Cooperativa Campesina de California
- Latino Coalition for a Healthy California
- League of United Latin American Citizens - California Chapter
- Mayor Eric Garcetti, City of Los Angeles
- Mexican American Legal Defense and Education Fund
- National Association of Social Workers - California Chapter
- Religious Action Center of Reform Judaism
- Sacramento Central Labor Council
- Service Employees International Union
- United Food & Commercial Workers Union - Western States Council
- Western Center on Law and Poverty

== Arguments in Opposition ==
Opponents of AB 1066 claim that the bill will reduce the annual take home pay for most agricultural workers. Opponents claim that rather than pay overtime, farmer owners will limit the hours of farmworkers and hire more farmworkers to compensate for the difference. Farmers in California must compete with farmers in other states and countries that have lower wage costs. California is already at a competitive disadvantage as it is one of the only states that currently provides overtime pay at all for agricultural workers.

Opponents of the Bill:

- Agricultural Council of California
- Alhambra Chamber of Commerce
- Almond Hullers & Processors
- Association of California Egg Farmers
- California Agricultural Aircraft Association
- California Association of Nurseries & Garden Centers
- California Association of Wheat Growers
- California Association of Winegrape Growers
- California Blueberry Association
- California Cattleman's Association
- California Chamber of Commerce
- California Citrus Mutual
- California Cotton Ginners Association
- California Cotton Growers Association
- California Dairies, Inc.
- California Farm Bureau Federation
- California Fresh Fruit Association
- California League of Food Processors
- California Manufacturers & Technology Association
- California Pear Growers Association
- California Seed Association
- California State Floral Association
- California Tomato Growers Association
- California Trucking Association
- Family Winemakers of California
- Far West Equipment Dealers Association Gilroy Chamber of Commerce
- Agricultural Aircraft Association Association of Nurseries & Garden Centers Association of Wheat Growers
- Association of Winegrape Growers Blueberry Association
- Cattlemen’s Association
- Chamber of Commerce
- Citrus Mutual
- CottonGinners Association
- Cotton Growers Association
- Dairies, Inc.
- Farm Bureau Federation
- Fresh Fruit Association
- League of Food Processors
- Manufacturers & Technology Association Pear Growers Association
- Seed Association
- State Floral Association
- Tomato Growers Association
- Trucking Association
- Lodi Chamber of Commerce
- Milk Producers Council
- National Federation of Independent Business Nisei Farmers League
- Western Agricultural Processors Association Western Growers Association
- Western Plant Health Association
- Western United Dairymen
- Wine Institute

== Prior Legislation ==
* SB 1211 (Florez) of 2010

SB 1211 passed the Senate Labor and Industrial Relations Committee, the Senate Floor, the Assembly Labor and Employment Committee, and the Assembly Floor, but was vetoed by Governor Schwarzenegger. In his veto message Governor Schwarzenegger explained his rationale for refusing to sign the bill by stating, "Unfortunately, this measure, while well-intended, will not improve the lives of California's agricultural workers and instead will result in additional burdens on California businesses, increased unemployment, and lower wages. In order to remain competitive against other states that do not have such wage requirements, businesses will simply avoid paying overtime."

* AB 1313 (Allen) of 2012

AB 1313 attempted to extend the 8-hour daily overtime rule to agricultural workers, but failed to pass concurrence on the Assembly Floor. The final vote was 35-33 with 12 Assemblymembers abstaining from voting.

* AB 2757 (Gonzalez) of 2016

AB 2757 was identical to AB 1066, but died on the Assembly Floor by a vote of 38-35 with 7 Assemblymembers abstaining from voting. The language of AB 2757 was amended into AB 1066 with the addition of coauthors and a clarification that any provisions of the existing Industrial Welfare Commission Wage Order for Agricultural Workers that provide protections and benefits beyond the scope of this bill should be left intact.
