= David Huerta (trade unionist) =

American trade union leader

- Born: Los Angeles County, California, U.S.
- Known for: President of the Service Employees International Union-United Service Workers West (2014-present); President of SEIU California (2022-2026); Arrest during June 2025 Los Angeles protests against mass deportation

David Huerta is an American trade union leader who is president of the Service Employees International Union-United Service Workers West (SEIU-USWW) and served as president of the SEIU California State Council (SEIU California) from 2022 to 2026.

== Early life and career ==
David Huerta was born and raised in Los Angeles County. He started his career as an organizer with Justice for Janitors and helped organize for better wages in Los Angeles County in the 1990s. He worked for the Service Employees International Union and became the SEIU Workers West president in 2014. He was noted by the Barack Obama administration as a "champion of change".

== SEIU presidency ==
In 2022, Huerta became the president of SEIU California, the union's second largest state affiliate. As president, he pushed for legislation to increase paid sick leave and raise the minimum wage for hotel and airport workers. He helped establish an immigration integration program, which provided English classes for union members and helped people through the citizenship process.

Huerta stepped down from the position in April 2026 after completing a four year term.

=== June 2025 arrest ===
On June 6, 2025, during an ICE raid, Huerta was injured and arrested, charged with felony conspiracy to impede an officer. He was briefly hospitalized and treated for a head injury.

U.S. senators for California Adam Schiff, who was present at the bond hearing, and Alex Padilla, along with Senate minority leader Chuck Schumer, petitioned for his release and demanded a review of his arrest. California governor Gavin Newsom also criticized Huerta's arrest, saying, "David Huerta is a respected leader, a patriot, and an advocate for working people. No one should ever be harmed for witnessing government action."

Huerta was released from custody on June 9, 2025, following a hearing in federal court. In October 2025, federal prosecutors downgraded the case from a felony to a misdemeanor. On July 27, 2026, the Department of Justice dropped all charges against Huerta.

== Personal life ==
Huerta is married with two children. He lives in Los Angeles County.
