= California Labor Code =

Collection of Californian civil law statutes

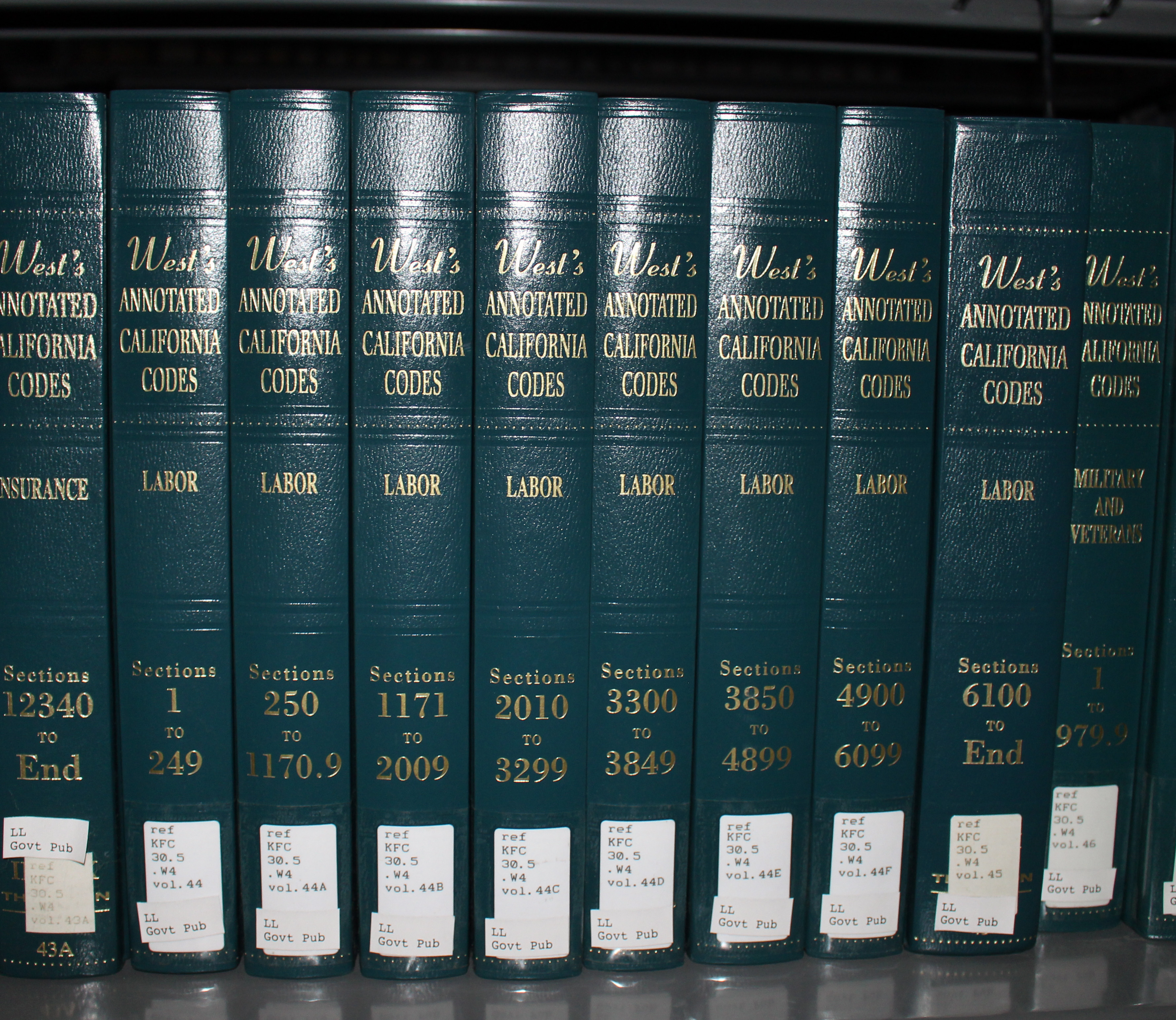
Volumes of the West's Annotated California Codes version of the Labor Code

The California Labor Code, more formally known as "the Labor Code", is a collection of civil law statutes for the State of California. The code is made up of statutes which govern the general obligations and rights of persons within the jurisdiction of the State of California. The stated goal of the Department of Industrial Relations is to promote and develop the welfare of the wage earners of California, to improve their working conditions and to advance their opportunities for profitable employment."

Although the Labor Code is dedicated to labor laws, other codifications such as the Family Code, the Insurance Code and the Government Code also contain labor laws; parallelism exists between provisions of the Labor Code and provisions of the Government Code. The Labor Code is in English. The Division of Labor Standards Enforcement maintains English and Spanish pre-recorded information phone lines that covered frequently asked topics.

== California Labor Code Divisions ==
=== Division 1. Department of Industrial Relations ===
This Division discusses the role and parameters by which the California Department of Industrial Relations operates. One of the functions of the department is to foster, promote, and develop the welfare of the wage earners of California, to improve their working conditions, and to advance their opportunities for profitable employment.

=== Division 2. Employment Regulation and Supervision ===
This Division regulates the compensation that employees earn, what hours they work, privileges and immunities of employees, agricultural labor relations, employee's wages and working conditions, licensing of talent agencies, public works and public agencies, unemployment relief in public works, car washes, health and sanitary conditions in employment, industrial homework, garment manufacturing, sheepherders, and private attorneys general actions.

=== Division 3. Employment Relations ===
This Division regulates the relationship between the employer and employee, their employment contract, the obligations of the employee, the inventions made by an employee, the termination of employment, and investigations of employees.

=== Division 4. Workers' Compensation and Insurance ===
Division 4 (Sections 3200 to 6002) regulates worker's compensation for employees of private employers who are injured while on the job, as well as worker's compensation insurance. The interpretation of the sections in Division 4 has been heavily litigated between employers and employees, and thus, there is a substantial body of case law interpreting this Division.

Pursuant to the procedures set forth in Part 4 of Division 4, California workers' compensation disputes are heard before the Workers Compensation Appeals Board (WCAB), which inherited the adjudicatory functions of the Industrial Accidents Commission. The IAC as originally created was far too small to hear all disputes directly, so it appointed referees who actually conducted hearings in its name, and then the IAC limited itself to hearing appeals from the decisions of those referees. Similarly, the WCAB today appoints workers' compensation judges who conduct hearings in its name in the hearing offices operated by the Division of Workers Compensation of the Department of Industrial Relations. The final orders of the workers' compensation judges by default become acts of the WCAB itself, unless a worker files a "petition for reconsideration" (in other words, appealing to the Board to reconsider the decision of the judge who acted on its behalf).

=== Division 4.5. Workers' Compensation and Insurance: State Employees Not Otherwise Covered ===
This Division regulates state employee's worker's compensation should they get injured while on the job and worker's compensation insurance.

=== Division 4.7. Retraining and Rehabilitation ===
This Division regulates the referral of injured state employees who may be benefited by rehabilitation services and retrained for other positions in public service.

=== Division 5. Safety and Employment ===
This Division regulates the conditions for a safe workplace. The Division of Occupational Safety and Health (DOSH, also known as Cal/OSHA) obtains its legal authority from this Division. DOSH's many responsibilities include inspecting nearly all elevators in California.

== History ==
=== 1911 ===
A voluntary workmen's compensation program was established in 1911. Also, a workmen's compensation section was added to the state constitution. California's first legislation on the subject of worker safety was the Workmen's Compensation, Insurance and Safety Act of 1913.

=== 1937 ===
The Governor, Frank Merriam approved the Labor Code on April 24, 1937, and it was in effect on August 27. Division V was based on the 1913 and 1917 statutes. The addition of section 6508 empowered the Industrial Accident Commission to protect people who worked in hazardous environment. The specific safety sections on railroads, buildings, mines and ships and vessels were added. The statute now better known under a specific judicial interpretation as the De Havilland Law was recodified from the old Civil Code into the Labor Code.

=== 1945 ===
The Division of Industrial Safety, one of the eight divisions within the California Department of Industrial Relations, gained the administration of the "Workmen's Safety" provisions of the Labor Code. Section 6604 was added in 1949 to prohibit the discharge of employees who refused to work in hazardous environment. Section 6416 was added in 1963; employers who failed to provide a safe working environment and caused the death of an employee could be penalized by one year in county jail or by a fine of up to $5,000.

=== 1970 ===
The Occupational Safety and Health Act passed by Congress in 1970 allowed states to develop their own plan. California submitted its plan on September 27, 1972. Later the California Occupational Safety and Health Act of 1973, Assembly Bill 150, was enacted. In 1971, the explosion of the Sylmar Tunnel raised people's attention to the effectiveness of the Labor Code. In 1972, the Tom Carrell Memorial Tunnel and Mine Safety Act was enacted. It added "tunnel and Mine Safety" to Division V of the Labor Code. On October 16, 1972, a freeway bridge in Pasadena collapsed. Hearings were held. Then AB 150 was introduced on January 23, 1973. It was filed as an emergency statute.

=== 1975 ===
After Jerry Brown, a friend of Cesar Chavez, became the governor of California, three bills having different ideas on the same subjects came out: AB 1, sponsored by the United Farm Workers; SB 308, by the Teamsters; and SB 813, by Brown. The product of debates and negotiations was the Alatorre-Zenovich-Dunlap-Berman Agricultural Labor Relations Act of 1975, signed into law by Brown. It was California's first farm labor law.

=== 1990 ===
Exxon Valdez oil spill happened on March 24, 1989. California Refinery and Chemical Plant Worker Safety Act of 1990 added section 7872 and 7873 to the Labor Code. On September 25, 1992, AB 2601 was signed into law. It protected gays and lesbians against employment discrimination. California was the seventh state to add sexual orientation to laws barring job discrimination.

=== 2003 ===
The California Worker Adjustment and Retraining Notification Act (WARN) became effective in 2003, it protects a broader scope of workers comparing to Federal's WARN. The California Legislature enacted the Private Attorneys General Act of 2004 to help workers collect penalties on behalf of the Labor and Workforce Development Agency. Wage Theft Prevention Act of 2011 (AB 469) went into effect.

=== 2013 ===
Effective January 1, 2013, section 980 prohibits an employer from requesting the access to a job applicant's or an employee's social media except in limited circumstance. In 2014, minimum wage increased from $8.00 to $9.00 per hour. Domestic Worker Bill of Rights went into effect.

== Industries ==
=== Amusement rides ===
After the death of a teenage girl at the Kern County Fair in 1967, California legislated inspecting amusement rides in 1968. Although the original version of the bill included permanent amusement rides, the amended version did not. About 30 years later, in 1999, the Permanent Amusement Ride Safety Inspection Program was added to the Labor Code.

=== Computer ===
Exempting an employee from overtime pay in the computer software field is not too easy according to section 515.5. The hourly pay rate requirement of it is no less than $36.00. However, trainees or unskilled people can be exempted even if they meet all the requirements. Writers can be exempted. Actors who meet the requirements for the purpose of filming can be exempted.

=== Entertainment ===
While some states do not have age restrictions on actors, California requires infants to be at least 15 days old to work as actors. California Child Actor's Bill protects child performers to safeguard a portion of their earnings. Due to the restriction on tobacco, actors in Mad Men smoked herbal cigarettes instead.

=== Garment ===
Assembly Bill 633 passed in 1999 added section 2673.1 which "guarantees" wages for garment workers. Labor Code 2676.5 requires every person registered as a garment manufacturer to display his or her name, address, and garment manufacturing registration number on the front entrance of his or her business. Section 2676.55, added in 2013, adds a civil penalty to it.

=== Restaurant ===
Although section 351 prohibits employers from collecting, taking or receiving any gratuity that is left for an employee by a patron, tip pooling issues are judged case by case. However, more and more restaurants are adopting no-tipping policy.

== Effect ==
A research conducted in Los Angeles reveals that 29.7 percent of the sampled L.A. workers were paid less than minimum wage during previous work week. The overtime violation rate was 15.5 percent. The meal break violation was 81.7 percent. The deductions violation rate was 45.3 percent. Twelve percent of L.A. respondents did not complain about serious problems in the workplace because they were afraid of losing their job. Study shows that half of the restaurant workers in San Francisco Chinatown received less than minimum wage. Since 2009, investigators found 89 percent of more than 1,600 cases in Southern California garment industry violate Labor Laws; its immigrant workers are unaware of their rights or are reluctant to speak up.

=== Citations ===
In 2013, Division of Labor Standards Enforcement Labor Commissioner cited a janitorial service provider, restaurant owners, warehouses, public work contractors, a medical supplies provider, a landscaping company, a holiday inn, a garment maker, a hotel, adult care facilities, an assisted living provider, a garment contractor, a hospital chain. Most citations are regarding wage issues in low-wage industries.

The report, "State of the Division of Labor Standards Enforcement," reveals that over $3 million unpaid minimum wages assessed in 2012, more than $13 million unpaid overtime wages assessed in 2012, over $51 million in civil penalties assessed in 2012.

In 2013, Cal/OSHA cited an automobile company, a chipping company, an adhesive technology company, an engineering company. Most citations were issued after the death of workers.

=== Lawsuits ===
August 13, 2014 FedEx agreed to pay a $2.1 million settlement to resolve a class action lawsuit about failing to provide proper meal and rest breaks. The lead plaintiff filed the lawsuit in September 2013. He was also awarded for about $7,500 for the settlement.
April 2, 2014 Walgreens reached a $29 million settlement of nine lawsuits. Walgreens was claimed that it failed to "provide its pharmacists and other employees with adequate breaks and meal periods, pay them overtime for mandatory security checks, pay all wages owed at termination, reimburse employees for business expenses, or provide itemized wage statements."
May 13, 2013 Starbucks agreed to pay $3 million to resolve a class action lawsuit accusing the company of several wage and hour violations. Class Members of this class action settlement include cafe attendants, baristas and shift supervisors who worked for Starbucks' California locations between December 2, 2007, and January 2013. The suit was filed by a barista and shift supervisor in December 2008.
February 5, 2013 The Ritz-Carlton Hotel Co. LLC was to pay $2 million to around 1500 former and current employees to end an overtime class action. This sue was started by a safety guard in November 2011. The attorneys would get 30 percent, or $600,000.
January 11, 2012 Carwash workers won a $1 million back pay settlement from eight carwashes for overtime, minimum wage, and lack of proper compensation issues.
October 12, 2011 Premier Warehousing and Impact Logistics failed to provide proper wage statements to employees. Their fine exceeded one million dollars.
September 19, 2011 AutoZone agreed to establish a $4.5 million class action settlement concerning wage and labor violations, but it denied any wrongdoing.

== Featured sections ==
Compared to other states, California's labor law is generally employee protective.

29.5: The Governor shall annually issue a proclamation declaring April 28 as Workers' Memorial Day.

96(k): The California Labor Commissioner can file claims on behalf of workers for loss of wages as the result of demotion, suspension, or discharge from employment for lawful conduct occurring during nonworking hours away from the employer's premises.

98.6(a): An employer cannot fire an employee or in any manner discriminate, retaliate, or take any adverse action against any employee or applicant for employment because the employee or applicant engaged in any conduct delineated in this section, including the conduct described in subdivision (k) of Section 96 (see above).
202: Employee who gives quitting notice 72 hours in ahead should be paid at the time of leaving. For telecommuting employees, usually employers need to arrange the mailing time of the final check or discharge the employee in person.
227.3: All unused paid vacations shall be paid when an employee is terminated. Its rate is based on the final wage.
245: California becomes the second state to require paid sick leave.
511: Employers may assign an alternative work schedule which extends the non-overtime daily work time from 8 hours to 10 hours, but it needs at least two-thirds of the affected employees' approval.
1171.5: Undocumented immigrants are protected by Labor Laws (enacted in 2002).
1194: Employees cannot waive right to overtime pay.
3203: Injury and Illness Prevention Program, went into effect in 1991, requires employers to establish, implement and maintain an effective Injury and Illness Prevention Program.
4658, 4660: These provisions of the Labor Code rely upon the American Medical Association Guides to the Evaluation of Permanent Impairment (5th Edition).

== See also ==
- California Codes
- Industrial Welfare Commission
- Law of California
- Minimum wage in California
- United States labor law
- Talent Agencies Act (California)
- Berman hearing
