= Minimum wage in the United States =

US map of adult hourly minimum wages by state and District of Columbia (D.C.)

The minimum wage by US state and year, 2016–2026

In the United States, the minimum wage is set by federal U.S. labor law and a range of state and local laws. The first federal minimum wage was instituted in the National Industrial Recovery Act of 1933, signed into law by President Franklin D. Roosevelt, but later found to be unconstitutional. In 1938, the Fair Labor Standards Act established it at 25¢ an hour ($5.72 in 2025). In 1968, its purchasing power peaked at $1.60 ($14.81 in 2025). As a result of inflation in the decades since, this remains the highest purchasing power the minimum wage has ever had. In 2009, Congress increased it to $7.25 per hour with the Fair Minimum Wage Act of 2007. It has not been increased since.

Employers have to pay workers the highest minimum wage of those prescribed by federal, state, and local laws. As of July 2025, 22 states and the District of Columbia have minimum wages above the federal level. In 2024, 843,000 hourly paid workers earned the federal minimum wage or less, representing 1.0 percent of hourly paid workers. Workers under age 25 accounted for 43 percent of that group, and nearly three quarters worked in service occupations, mostly in food preparation and serving jobs. The estimates exclude overtime pay, tips, and commissions and do not measure coverage under federal, state, or local minimum-wage laws.

In January 2020, almost 90% of Americans earning the minimum wage were earning more than the federal minimum wage due to local minimum wages. In May 2019, nationwide, the average minimum-wage worker earned $11.80 per hour; this was the highest it had been since at least 1994, the earliest year for which effective-minimum-wage data are available.

In 2021, the Congressional Budget Office estimated that incrementally raising the federal minimum wage to $15 an hour by 2025 would impact 17 million employed persons but would also reduce employment by ~1.4 million people. Additionally, 900,000 people might be lifted out of poverty and potentially raise wages for 10 million more workers. Furthermore, the increase would be expected to cause prices to rise and overall economic output to decrease slightly, and increase the federal budget deficit by $54 billion over the next 10 years. (Note: See the section on Employment for more detailed findings from this study, including employment estimates on raising the wage to $10 or $12 per hour.) An Ipsos survey in August 2020 found that support for a rise in the federal minimum wage had grown substantially during the COVID-19 pandemic, with 72% of Americans in favor, including 62% of Republicans and 87% of Democrats. A March 2021 poll by Monmouth University Polling Institute, conducted as a minimum-wage increase was being considered in Congress, found 53% of respondents supporting an increase to $15 an hour and 45% opposed.

== History ==
Minimum wage legislation emerged at the end of the nineteenth century, from the desire to end sweatshops which had developed in the wake of industrialization. Sweatshops employed large numbers of women and young workers, paying them what were considered non-living wages that did not allow them to afford the necessities of life. Besides substandard wages, sweatshops were also associated with long work hours and unsanitary and unsafe work conditions. From the 1890s to the 1920s, during the Progressive Era — a time of social activists and political reform across the United States — progressive reformers, women's organizations, religious figures, academics, and politicians all played an important role in getting state minimum wage laws passed throughout the United States.

The first successful attempts at using minimum wage laws to ameliorate the problem of nonliving wages occurred in the Australian state of Victoria in 1896. Factory inspector reports and newspaper reporting on the conditions of sweated labor in Melbourne led in 1895 to the formation of the National Anti-Sweating League which pushed the government aggressively to deal legislatively with the problem of substandard wages. The government, following the recommendation of the Victorian Chief Secretary Alexander Peacock, established wage boards which were tasked with establishing minimum wages in the labor trades which suffered from unlivable wages. Campaigns against sweated labor were also underway in the United States and England at that time.

The first minimum wage legislation in the United States was enacted in Massachusetts in 1912, and several other states soon followed suit. These state laws, which were focused on women and children, were struck down by the Supreme Court between 1923 and 1937. The first federal minimum wage law, which exempted large parts of the workforce, was enacted in 1938 and set rates that became obsolete during World War II.

=== Progressive Era ===
As in Australia, civic concern for sweated labor developed in the United States towards the end of the Gilded Age. In New York in 1890, a group of female reformers who were worried about the harsh conditions of sweated labor in the country formed the Consumer's League of the City of New York. The consumer group sought to improve working conditions by boycotting products made under sweated conditions and did not conform to a code of "fair house" standards. Similarly, consumer leagues formed throughout the United States, and in 1899, they united under the National Consumer League (NCL) parent organization. Consumer advocacy, however, was extremely slow at changing conditions in the sweated industries. When NCL leaders in 1908 went to an international anti-sweatshop conference in Geneva, Switzerland, and were introduced to Australian minimum wage legislation, which had successfully dealt with sweated labor, they came home believers and made minimum wage legislation part of their national platform.

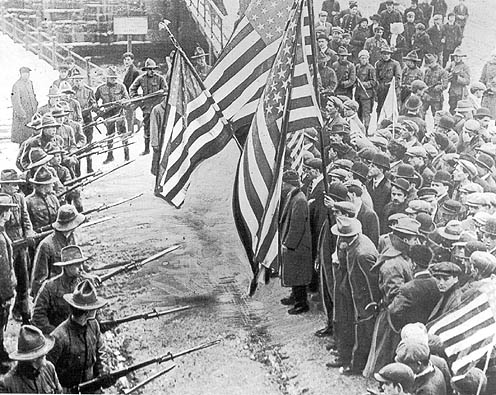
Massachusetts militiamen surround a group of strikers during the 1912 Lawrence textile strike which proved pivotal in the passage of the first U.S. minimum wage legislation.

In 1910, in conjunction with advocacy work led by Florence Kelley of the National Consumer League, the Women's Trade Union League (WTLU) of Massachusetts under the leadership of Elizabeth Evans took up the cause of minimum wage legislation in Massachusetts. Over the next two years, a coalition of social reform groups and labor advocates in Boston pushed for minimum wage legislation in the state. On June 4, 1912, Massachusetts passed the first minimum wage legislation in the United States, which established a state commission for recommending non-compulsory minimum wages for women and children. The passage of the bill was significantly assisted by the Lawrence textile strike which had raged for ten weeks at the beginning of 1912. The strike brought national attention to the plight of the low-wage textile workers, and pushed the state legislatures, who feared the magnitude of the strike, to enact progressive labor legislation.

In 1916, California Representative John I. Nolan introduced H.R. 7625, which would have established a $3 per day minimum wage for federal employees. It was endorsed by the American Federation of Labor and the National Federation of Federal Employees, but the bill's opponents in the House kept it from coming to a vote. In 1918, California Senator Hiram Johnson co-sponsored the legislation, and it became known as the Johnson-Nolan Minimum Wage Bill. It passed the House that September, but was stalled in the Senate Committee on Education and Labor. It was reintroduced two years later and passed in both the House and Senate, but when it went to conference it was filibustered by Southern Democrats who opposed it because it would have paid African American employees the same as white employees.

By 1923, fifteen U.S. states and the District of Columbia had passed minimum wage laws, with pressure being placed on state legislatures by the National Consumers League in a coalition with other women's voluntary associations and organized labor. The United States Supreme Court of the Lochner era (1897–1937), however, consistently invalidated labor regulation laws. Advocates for state minimum wage laws hoped that they would be upheld under the precedent of Muller v. Oregon (1908), which upheld maximum working hours laws for women on the grounds that women required special protection that men did not. The Supreme Court, however, did not extend this principle to minimum wage laws. The court ruled in Adkins v. Children's Hospital (1923) that the District of Columbia's minimum wage law was unconstitutional because the law interfered with the ability of employers to freely negotiate wage contracts with employees. The court also noted that women did not require any more special protection by the law, following the passage in 1920 of the Nineteenth Amendment, which gave women the right to vote and equal legal status.

However, at the same time, in the United States, the late 19th century ideas for favoring a minimum wage (rather than wage subsidies) coincided with the eugenics movement. As a consequence, many prominent Progressive economists at the time, including Royal Meeker, Henry Rogers Seager, and Edward Cummings, argued for adoption of a minimum wage for the explicit purpose of supporting the "right" sort of semi- and unskilled laborers while forcing the "wrong" sort (including immigrants, racial minorities, women, and the disabled) out of the labor market and, over the longer term, impeding their ability to thrive and have families, or, in the case of women, push them out of the labor pool and back towards the home. The recognized result of a minimum wage, a contraction in a firm's labor force and societal elimination of the "wrong" sort of people, was the specific stated outcome, with a view to applying it across the entirety of the American body politic.

=== New Deal ===
"It seems to me to be equally plain that no business which depends for existence on paying less than living wages to its workers has any right to continue in this country."

— Franklin D. Roosevelt, 1933

In 1933, the Roosevelt administration during the New Deal made the first attempt at establishing a national minimum wage regiment with the National Industrial Recovery Act, which set minimum wage and maximum hours on an industry and regional basis. The Supreme Court, however, in Schechter Poultry Corp. v. United States (1935) ruled the act unconstitutional, and the minimum wage regulations were abolished. Two years later after President Roosevelt's overwhelming reelection in 1936 and discussion of judicial reform, the Supreme Court took up the issue of labor legislation again in West Coast Hotel Co. v. Parrish (1937) and upheld the constitutionality of minimum wage legislation enacted by Washington state and overturned the Adkins decision which marked the end of the Lochner era. In 1938, the minimum wage was re-established pursuant to the Fair Labor Standards Act, this time at a uniform rate of 25¢ per hour (equivalent to $5.72 in 2025). The Supreme Court upheld the Fair Labor Standards Act in United States v. Darby Lumber Co. (1941), holding that Congress had the power under the Commerce Clause to regulate employment conditions.

The 1938 minimum wage law only applied to "employees engaged in interstate commerce or in the production of goods for interstate commerce," but in amendments in 1961 and 1966, the federal minimum wage was extended (with slightly different rates) to employees in large retail and service enterprises, local transportation and construction, state and local government employees, as well as other smaller expansions; a grandfather clause in 1990 drew most employees into the purview of federal minimum wage policy, which by then set the wage at $3.80.

== Legislation ==
=== Federal laws ===
The federal minimum wage in the United States has been $7.25 per hour since July 2009, the last time Congress raised it. Some types of labor are exempt. Employers may pay tipped labor a minimum of $2.13 per hour, as long as the hourly wage plus tip income equals at least the minimum wage. Persons under the age of 20 may be paid $4.25 an hour for the first 90 calendar days of employment (sometimes known as a youth, teen, or training wage) unless a higher state minimum exists. The 2009 increase was the last of three steps of the Fair Minimum Wage Act of 2007, which increased the wage from $5.15 per hour in 2007 to $7.25 per hour in 2009.

==== Disability exemption (subminimum wage) ====
Section 14(c) of the Fair Labor Standards Act of 1938 included an exemption for people with disabilities, intended to help disabled World War I veterans have employment opportunities. Since then, non-profit organizations have hired disabled workers in sheltered workshops, with about 300,000 individuals working in this arrangement in 2015. At the end of the 20th century, a movement to end sheltered workshops and ban sub-minimum wages gained traction, with supporters stating that the jobs pay low wages, lack advancement training and opportunities, (permanently trapping disabled people in those jobs while reducing their independence), and are discriminatory because they segregate disabled workers into separate work environments. Disability service providers, many parents, and disabled workers themselves support the workshops and state that eliminating the minimum wage exemption would eliminate those jobs and the choice to work (because many with severe disabilities will never be able to perform at the level of an ordinary worker) and thereby prevent disabled people from enjoying the many non-wage benefits of work (like a sense of pride for their societal contribution), and replace it with adult day care. By 2020, seven states had passed laws banning subminimum wages.

Recent research provides national quasi-experimental evidence on the labor market effects of eliminating subminimum wages, finding that elimination reduced Section 14(c) employment but did not significantly reduce overall employment, hours worked, or wages among people with disabilities.

=== State laws ===
In the United States, each state is allowed to set its minimum wage independently of the federal government. Where the state and federal minimum wage differ, the higher wage prevails. As of August 2022, 30 states had a minimum wage higher than the federal minimum. Washington, D.C. has the highest minimum wage at $17.50 per hour. Since 2009, multiple state legislatures have enacted state preemption laws which prohibit local governments from setting their own minimum wage amounts. As of 2017, state preemption laws for local minimum wages have passed in 25 states.

=== Local ordinances ===
Some smaller government entities, such as counties and cities, observe minimum wages that are higher than those of the state in which they are located. In 2003, San Francisco, California, and Santa Fe, New Mexico, were the first two cities (Note: San Francisco is a consolidated city and county under California law.) to introduce local minimum wage ordinances. There has been an increase in county and city-level minimum wages. In 2010, only three cities had minimum wages that exceeded state or federal minimum wages, but by 2020, there were 42.

In a wave of minimum wage legislative action, Seattle, Washington, was the first city to enact on June 2, 2014, a local ordinance to increase the minimum wage for all workers to $15.00 per hour, which phased in over seven years. This ordinance followed the referendum in SeaTac, Washington, in November 2013, which raised on a more limited scale the local minimum wage to $15.00 for transportation and hospitality workers. Numerous other cities have followed Seattle's example since. San Francisco became the first major city in the U.S. to reach a minimum wage of $15.00 per hour on July 1, 2018. New York City's minimum wage was $15.00 per hour by the end of 2018. The minimum wage in Los Angeles and Washington, D.C., became $15.00 per hour in 2020. By July 1, 2021, the minimum wage in Chicago was $15.00, with Illinois matching the rate statewide by 2025. As of July 1, 2026, the minimum wage in Chicago is $17.05 per hour for non-tipped employees and $12.96 for tipped employees. Similarly, the minimum wage in Minneapolis, Minnesota had reached $15.00 per hour by 2022. A growing number of California cities and counties have also enacted local minimum wage ordinances to increase the minimum wage to $15.00 per hour or higher, including Berkeley, El Cerrito, Emeryville, Mountain View, Oakland, Richmond, San Jose and the unincorporated areas of Los Angeles County.

In May 2025, Los Angeles increased the minimum hourly wage for hotel workers to $22.50, with a new law mandating incremental increases to $30 per hour by 2028. By March 2026, this had resulted in hotels reducing their staffing levels by 6%, with a survey of hotels stating that this will cause their labor costs to rise by 90%, with 60% of them stating that they might be unprofitable by the end of 2026.

=== Puerto Rico ===
In contrast, the relatively high minimum wage in Puerto Rico has been blamed by various politicians and commentators as a highly significant factor in the Puerto Rican government-debt crisis. One study concluded that "Employers are disinclined to hire workers because the US federal minimum wage is very high relative to the local average".

The Puerto Rico Minimum Wage Act, passed by the territorial legislature in 2021 started raising the local minimum wage above the federal minimum. It increased the territorial minimum wage from $7.25 to $10.50 per hour (or higher) by July 1, 2024, and created the Minimum Wage Review Commission within the Puerto Rico Department of Labor and Human Resources which was to review and increase the minimum wage yearly via decrees. If by July 1, 2024, the Minimum Wage Review Commission decides the wage ought to be higher than $10.50, it will so decree. The law also provided employees of local businesses not covered by the Fair Labor Standards Act of 1938 with protections.

=== Inflation indexing ===
Some politicians in the United States advocate linking the minimum wage to the consumer price index, thereby increasing the wage automatically each year based on increases to the consumer price index. Linking the minimum wage to the consumer price index avoids the erosion of the purchasing power of the minimum wage with time because of inflation. In 1998, the Washington State Legislature approved the first consumer price indexing for its minimum wage in the country. In 2003, San Francisco, California and Santa Fe, New Mexico were the first cities to approve consumer price indexing for their minimum wage. Oregon and Florida were the next states to link their minimum wages to the consumer price index. Later in 2006, voters in six states (Arizona, Colorado, Missouri, Montana, Nevada, and Ohio) approved statewide increases in the state minimum wage. The amounts of these increases ranged from $1 to $1.70 per hour, and all increases were designed to annually index to inflation. As of 2018, the minimum wage is indexed to inflation in 17 states.

=== Union exemptions ===
Some minimum wage ordinances have an exemption for unionized workers. For instance, the Los Angeles City Council approved a minimum salary in 2014 for hotel workers of $15.37 per hour which has such an exemption. This led in some cases to longtime workers at unionized hotels such as the Sheraton Universal making $10.00 per hour, whereas non-union employees at a non-union Hilton less than 500 feet away making at least $15.37 as mandated by law for non-unionized employees. Similar exemptions have been adopted in other cities. As of December 2014, unions were exempt from minimum wage ordinances in Chicago, Illinois, SeaTac, Washington, and Milwaukee County, Wisconsin, as well as the California cities of Los Angeles, San Francisco, Long Beach, San Jose, Richmond, and Oakland. In 2016, the Council of the District of Columbia enacted a minimum wage ordinance that included a union waiver, but Mayor Vincent Gray vetoed it. Later that year, the council approved an increase without the union waiver.

== Historical trend ==
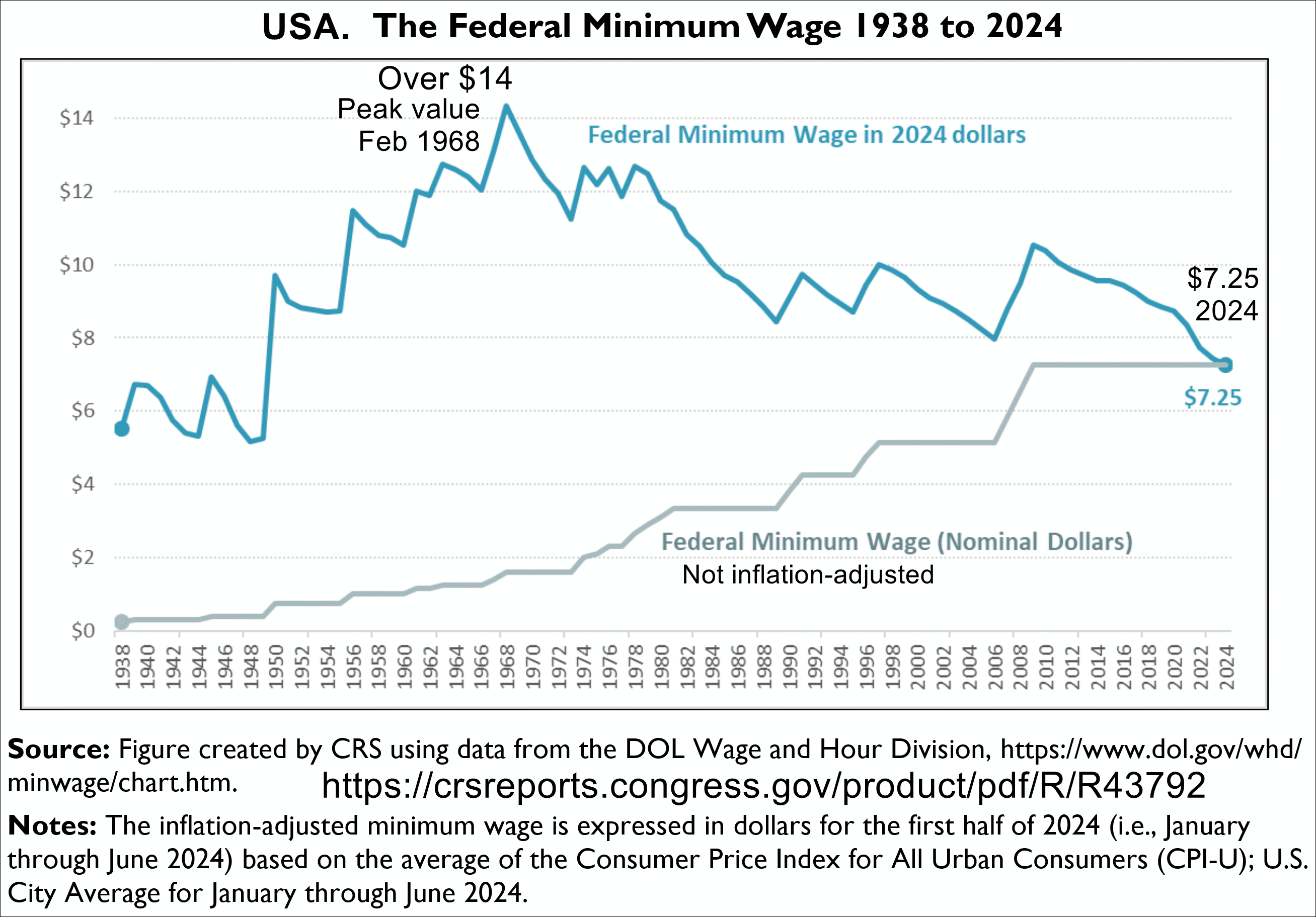
Timeline of federal minimum hourly wage for the United States. Nominal dollars. And inflation-adjusted dollars.

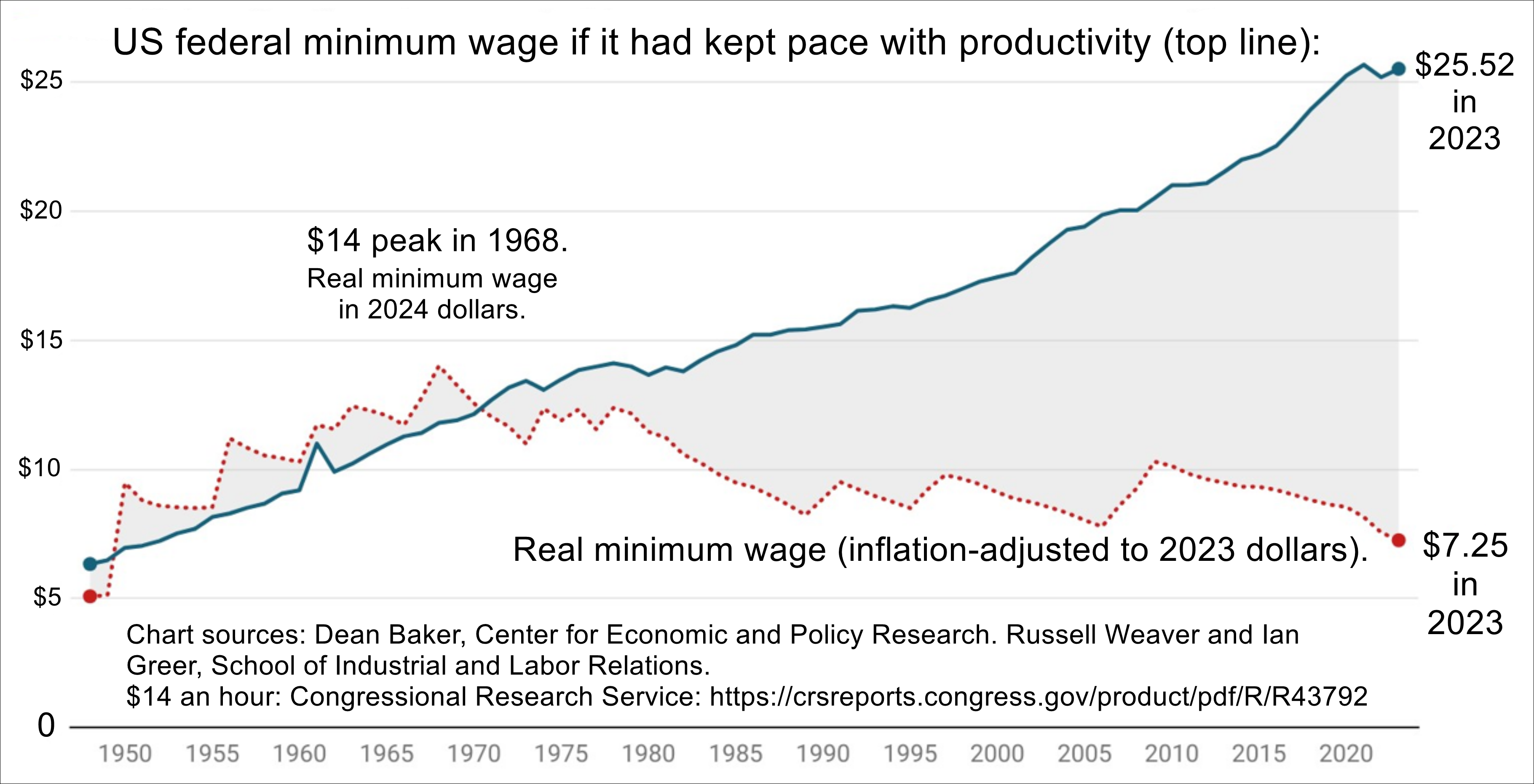
US federal minimum wage if it had kept pace with the average worker's productivity. Also, the inflation-adjusted minimum wage.

The federal minimum wage was introduced in 1938 at the rate of 25¢ per hour (equivalent to $5.19 in 2022). By 1950 the minimum wage had risen to 75¢ per hour. The purchasing power of the federal minimum wage has fluctuated; it was highest in February 1968, when it was $1.60 per hour. The real value of the federal minimum wage in 2022 dollars has decreased by 46% since its inflation-adjusted peak in February 1968. The minimum wage would be $13.46 in 2022 dollars if its real value had remained at the 1968 level. See chart to right. From January 1981 to April 1990, the minimum wage was frozen at $3.35 per hour, then a record-setting minimum wage freeze. From September 1, 1997, through July 23, 2007, the federal minimum wage remained constant at $5.15 per hour, breaking the old record. On July 24, 2008, the minimum wage was adjusted to $6.55, and then to $7.25 on July 24, 2009, where it has remained fixed as of 2024.

In August 2022, 30 states and the District of Columbia had minimum wages higher than the federal minimum. As of July 2025, 22 states and the District of Columbia have minimum wages above the federal level.

== Economic effects ==
The owner, the employees, and the buying public are all one and the same, and unless an industry can so manage itself as to keep wages high and prices low it destroys itself, for otherwise it limits the number of its customers. One's own employees ought to be one's own best customers.

— Henry Ford, 1926

The economic effects of raising the minimum wage are unclear. Adjusting the minimum wage may affect current and future levels of employment, prices of goods and services, economic growth, income inequality, and poverty. The interconnection of price levels, central bank policy, wage agreements, and total aggregate demand creates a situation in which conclusions drawn from macroeconomic analysis are highly influenced by the underlying assumptions of the interpreter.

=== Employment ===
In neoclassical economics, the law of demand states that—all else being equal—raising the price of any particular good or service reduces the quantity demanded. Therefore, neoclassical economists argue that—all else being equal—raising the minimum wage will have adverse effects on employment. Conceptually, if an employer does not believe a worker generates value equal to or in excess of the minimum wage, they do not hire or retain that worker.

Other economists of different schools of thought argue that a limited increase in the minimum wage does not affect or increase the number of jobs available. Economist David Cooper for instance estimates that a higher minimum wage would support the creation of at least 85,000 new jobs in the United States. This divergence of thought began with empirical work on fast food workers in the 1990s which challenged the neoclassical model. In 1994, economists David Card and Alan Krueger studied employment trends among 410 restaurants in New Jersey and eastern Pennsylvania following New Jersey's minimum wage hike (from $4.25 to $5.05) in April 1992. They found "no indication that the rise in the minimum wage reduced employment." Similarly, a Morgan Study concluded that a national $15 minimum wage would have minimal to no positive or negative effect on employment levels. In contrast, a 1995 analysis of the evidence by David Neumark found that the increase in New Jersey's minimum wage resulted in a 4.6% decrease in employment. Neumark's study relied on payroll records from a sample of large fast-food restaurant chains, whereas the Card-Krueger study relied on business surveys.

A literature review conducted by David Neumark and William Wascher in 2007 (which surveyed 101 studies related to the employment effects of minimum wages) found that about two-thirds of peer-reviewed economic research showed a positive correlation between minimum wage hikes and increased unemployment—especially for young and unskilled workers. Neumark's review further found that, when looking at only the most credible research, 85% of studies showed a positive correlation between minimum wage hikes and increased unemployment. A survey of labor economists has similarly found broad agreement that minimum wage increases tend to raise unemployment among low-skilled workers.

Statistical meta-analysis conducted by Tom Stanley in 2005 in contrast found that there is evidence of publication bias in minimum wage literature, and that correction of this bias shows no relationship between the minimum wage and unemployment. In 2008 Hristos Doucouliagos and Tom Stanley conducted a similar meta-analysis of 64 U.S. studies on disemployment effects and concluded that Card and Krueger's initial claim of publication bias was correct. Moreover, they concluded, "Once this publication selection is corrected, little or no evidence of a negative association between minimum wages and employment remains."

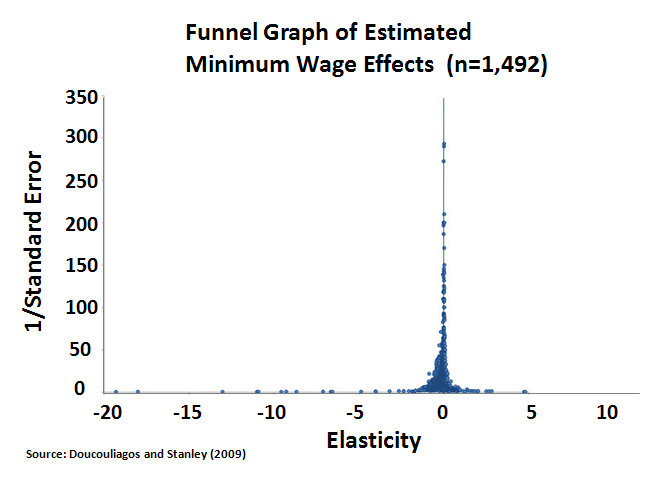
Estimated minimum wage effects on employment from a meta-study of 64 other studies showed insignificant employment effect (both practically and statistically) from minimum-wage raises. The most precise estimates were heavily clustered at or near zero employment effects (elasticity = 0).

A 2012 study led by Joseph Sabia estimated that the 2004–6 New York State minimum wage increase (from $5.15 to $6.75) resulted in a 20.2% to 21.8% reduction in employment for less-skilled, less-educated workers. Similarly, a study led by Richard Burkhauser in 2000 concluded that minimum wage increases "significantly reduce the employment of the most vulnerable groups in the working-age population—young adults without a high school degree (aged 20-24), young black adults and teenagers (aged 16-24), and teenagers (aged 16-19)."

The Economist wrote in December 2013 in sum that: "A minimum wage, providing it is not set too high, could thus boost pay with no ill effects on jobs...Some studies find no harm to employment from federal or state minimum wages, others see a small one, but none finds any serious damage...High minimum wages, however, particularly in rigid labour markets, do appear to hit employment. France has the rich world's highest wage floor, at more than 60% of the median for adults and a far bigger fraction of the typical wage for the young. This helps explain why France also has shockingly high rates of youth unemployment: 26% for 15- to 24-year-olds."

In 2014 the state with the highest minimum wage in the nation, Washington, exceeded the national average for job growth in the United States. Washington had a job growth rate 0.3% faster than the national average job growth rate.

A 2018 University of Washington study which investigated the effects of Seattle's minimum wage increases (from $9.50 to $11 in 2015 and then to $13 in 2016) found that while the second wage increase caused hourly wages to grow by 3%, it also caused employers to cut employee hours by 6%, yielding an average decrease of $74 earned per month per job in 2016. In a follow-up study, the researchers found that workers already employed at the time of the wage increase and with above-median experience saw their earnings go up by an average of $8–$12 per week, (with one-quarter of the earnings gains attributed to experienced workers making up for lost hours in Seattle with work outside the city limits) while the earnings of less-experienced workers saw no significant change. Additionally, the study associated the minimum wage increase with an 8% reduction in employee turnover, and a significant reduction of new workers joining the workforce.

A 2019 study in the Quarterly Journal of Economics found that state changes in minimum wage levels between 1979 and 2016 had no impact on the overall number of low-wage jobs. A 2021 study on the effects in the late 1960s and early 1970s of the 1966 extension of the Fair Labor Standards Act, which extended the minimum wage to cover several economic sectors where nearly a third of all black workers were employed, found that the new minimum wages led to a sharp increase in earnings for the newly covered workers without any adverse aggregate effects on employment and also substantially reduced the racial wage gap.

One reason why the minimum wage may increase employment or have no impact on employment is that if monopsony power is present within a labour market.

==== California's 2024 25% minimum wage increase for fast-food workers ====
A study published in April 2025 by Pepperdine University which used data from the California Employment Development Department found that California's 25% minimum wage increase for fast-food workers (AB1228) to $20 per hour (which went into effect in April 2024) caused employment in the fast food sector to decline by about 23,000 jobs, while fast food employment grew by 0.8% nationwide. This is consistent with patterns of disemployment effects among younger and less-experienced workers found in multiple studies.

A study published in July 2025 by the National Bureau of Economic Research which studied the results of the above-mentioned law found that from September 2023 to September 2024 employment in the fast food sector declined by about 18,000 jobs, or -3.2 percent while the nationwide rate grew by +0.8% over that same period.

A study published in 2024 and revised in September 2025 by the University of California, Berkeley found that "the wage increase did not lead to job cuts. Employment levels remained steady across the fast food industry." The same study also found that the change "increase[d] fast food prices by about 2.1 percent, or about 8 cents for a $4 item, two quarters after the policy, implying a price pass-through of 0.6 to 0.7." A report from Reason disagreed with these employment findings, stating that the data presented in the study "...clearly shows California fast-food employment increas[ed] more slowly than the [data on] national fast-food employment, which is the opposite of the authors' claim. If [this data] suggest[s] anything, [it is] that the minimum wage increase reduced California fast-food jobs."

Other results from the 25% increase in the minimum wage for fast food workers were a 13% increase in weekly earnings, and an increase in prices.

==== Congressional Budget Office's estimates of federal minimum wage increases ====
The Congressional Budget Office (CBO) in 2014 estimated the theoretical effects of a federal minimum wage increase under two scenarios: an increase to $9.00 and an increase to $10.10. According to the report, approximately 100,000 jobs would be lost under the $9.00 option, whereas 500,000 jobs would be lost under the $10.10 option (with a wide range of possible outcomes).

The CBO in 2019 estimated the theoretical effects of a federal minimum wage increase under three scenarios: increases per hour to $10, $12 and $15 by 2025. Under the $15 scenario, in 2025 up to 27 million workers could see increases to their average weekly earnings while 3.7 million workers could lose employment. The latter statistic, in CBO's estimation would rise over time in any wage increase scenario as capital allocation replaces some workers. Wage increases would be heavily skewed (40%) towards those already earning above the minimum wage with more than 80% of benefits accruing to more educated workers living above the poverty line (Table 5). The number of persons in poverty would be reduced by 1.3 million (assuming no tax implications from increased income). The CBO notes that it does not consider the inflationary effects of these policies when estimating the change in poverty level as these estimates, while increasing inflation, are uncertain. Additionally, the CBO assumed that the weight of benefits would accrue to those below the poverty level based on historical wage increase levels. They noted that data on the minimum wage tends to assume the opposite (that benefits accrue to those above the poverty level), but that that data was not definitive enough to allow for estimation in their work. Some aspects of the CBO study are summarized in the table below.

| Policy | $10 | $12 | $15 |
|---|---|---|---|
| Workers below new Minimum Wage that could see wage increase (millions) | 1.5 | 5 | 17 |
| Workers above new Minimum Wage that could see wage increase (millions) | 2 | 6 | 10 |
| Change in employment in an average week (millions) | −0.05 | −0.3 Median / 0 to −0.8 range | −1.3 Median / 0 to −3.7 range |
| Change in the number of people in poverty (millions) | −0.05 | −0.4 | −1.3 |
| Change in Real Annual Income: Families below poverty threshold (billions of 2018 dollars) | 0.4 | 2.3 | 7.7 |
| Change in Real Annual Income: Families between one and three times the poverty threshold (billions of 2018 dollars) | 0.3 | 2.3 | 14.2 |
| Change in Real Annual Income: Families between three and six times the poverty threshold (billions of 2018 dollars) | −0.05 | −0.3 | −2.1 |
| Change in Real Annual Income: Families with more than six times the poverty threshold (billions of 2018 dollars) | −0.6 | −5.1 | −28.4 |
| Change in Real Annual Income: All families (billions of 2018 dollars) | −0.1 | −0.8 | −8.7 |

=== Prices ===
Conceptually, raising the minimum wage increases the cost of labor, with all other things being equal. Thus, employers may accept some combination of lower profits, higher prices, or increased automation. If prices increase, consumers may demand a lesser quantity of the product, substitute other products, or switch to imported products, due to the effects of price elasticity of demand. Marginal producers (those who are barely profitable enough to survive) may be forced out of business if they cannot raise their prices sufficiently to offset the higher cost of labor. Federal Reserve Bank of Chicago research from 2007 has shown that restaurant prices rise in response to minimum wage increases. However, there are studies that show that higher prices for products due to increased labor cost are usually only by about 0.4% of the original price.

According to a 2020 study, a 10% minimum wage increase for grocery store workers translates into 0.36% higher grocery prices which is consistent with full cost pass-through. Similarly, a 2021 study which covered 10,000 McDonald's restaurants in the US found that between 2016 and 2020, the cost of 10% minimum wage increases for McDonald's workers were passed through to customers as 1.4% increases in the price of a Big Mac. This results in minimum wage workers getting a lesser increase in their "real wage" than in their nominal wage, because any goods and services they purchase made with minimum-wage labor have now increased in cost, analogous to an increase in the sales tax.

=== Effect on suicides ===
Researchers found in 2019 that, "Between 1990 and 2015, raising the minimum wage by $1 in each state might have saved more than 27,000 lives, according to a report published this week in the Journal of Epidemiology & Community Health. An increase of $2 in each state's minimum wage could have prevented more than 57,000 suicides." The researchers stated, "The effect of a US$1 increase in the minimum wage ranged from a 3.4% decrease (95% CI 0.4 to 6.4) to a 5.9% decrease (95% CI 1.4 to 10.2) in the suicide rate among adults aged 18–64 years with a high school education or less. We detected significant effect modification by unemployment rate, with the largest effects of minimum wage on reducing suicides observed at higher unemployment levels." They concluded, "Minimum wage increases appear to reduce the suicide rate among those with a high school education or less, and may reduce disparities between socioeconomic groups. Effects appear greatest during periods of high unemployment."

=== Effects on crime ===
A 2016 White House report argued that higher hourly wages led to less crime. The study by the Council of Economic Advisers calculated that "raising the minimum wage reduces crime by 3 to 5 percent." To get those numbers, the study assumed that "such a minimum wage increase would have no employment impacts, with an employment elasticity of 0.1 the benefits would be somewhat lower."

By contrast, in a 1987 journal article, economist Masanori Hashimoto noted that minimum wage hikes lead to increased levels of property crime in areas affected by the minimum wage after its increase. According to the article, by decreasing employment in poor communities, total legal trade and production are curtailed. The report also argued that to compensate for the decrease in legal avenues for production and consumption, poor communities increasingly turn to illegal trade and activity.

=== Economic growth ===
Whether growth (GDP, a measure of both income and production) increases or decreases depends significantly on whether the income shifted from owners to workers results in an overall higher level of spending. The tendency of a consumer to spend their next dollar is referred to as the marginal propensity to consume or MPC. The transfer of income from higher income owners (who tend to save more, meaning a lower MPC) to lower income workers (who tend to save less, with a higher MPC) can actually lead to an increase in total consumption and higher demand for goods, leading to increased employment.

The CBO reported in February 2014 that income (GDP) overall would be marginally higher after raising the minimum wage, indicating a small net positive increase in growth. Raising the minimum wage to $10.10 and indexing it to inflation would result in a net $2 billion increase in income during the second half of 2016, while raising it to $9.00 and not indexing it would result in a net $1 billion increase in income.

Additionally, a study by Overstreet in 2019 examined increases to the minimum wage in Arizona. Utilizing data spanning from 1976 to 2017, Overstreet found that a 1% increase in the minimum wage was significantly correlated with a 1.13% increase in per capita income in Arizona. This study could show that smaller increases in minimum wage may not distort labor market as significantly as larger increases experienced in other cities and states. Thus, the small increases experienced in Arizona may have actually led to a slight increase in economic growth.

=== Income inequality ===
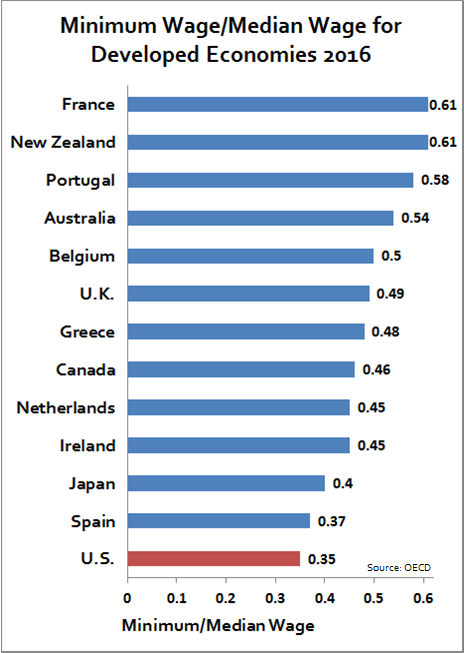
Minimum wage levels in developed economies as a share of median full-time wage. The relative minimum wage ratio in the U.S. is shown in red.

An increase in the minimum wage is a form of redistribution from higher-income persons (business owners or "capital") to lower income persons (workers or "labor") and therefore should reduce income inequality. The CBO estimated in February 2014 that raising the minimum wage under either scenario described above would improve income inequality. Families with income more than 6 times the poverty threshold would see their incomes fall (due in part to their business profits declining with higher employee costs), while families with incomes below that threshold would rise. Writing in The Atlantic, journalist Derek Thompson summarized several studies which indicate that both state-level minimum wage increases and tighter labor markets caused wages to grow faster for lower income workers than higher income workers during the 2018–2019 time period.

=== Poverty ===
Among hourly-paid workers in 2016, 701,000 earned the federal minimum wage and about 1.5 million earned wages below the minimum. Together, these 2.2 million workers represented 2.7% of all hourly-paid workers.

The CBO estimated in February 2014 that raising the minimum wage would reduce the number of persons below the poverty income threshold by 900,000 under the $10.10 option versus 300,000 under the $9.00 option. Similarly, Arindrajit Dube, professor of economics at University of Massachusetts Amherst, found in a 2017 study "robust evidence that higher minimum wages lead to increases in incomes among families at the bottom of the income distribution and that these wages reduce the poverty rate." According to the study "a 10 percent increase in the minimum wage reduces the nonelderly poverty rate by about 5 percent." Similarly, a Morgan Study concluded that a national $15 minimum wage would lift tens of millions of Americans, potentially 32 million Americans, out of poverty, and would also improve racial wage gaps.

In contrast, research conducted by David Neumark and colleagues in 2004 found that minimum wages are associated with reductions in the hours and employment of low-wage workers. A separate study by the same researchers found that minimum wages tend to increase the proportion of families with incomes below or near the poverty line. Similarly, a 2002 study led by Richard Vedder, professor of economics at Ohio University, concluded that "The empirical evidence is strong that minimum wages have had little or no effect on poverty in the U.S. Indeed, the evidence is stronger that minimum wages occasionally increase poverty…"

According to some economists, minimum wage increases result in a variety of negative effects for lower-skilled workers including reduced employment, reduced hours, reduced benefits, and less safe working conditions.

=== Federal budget deficit ===
In 2021, the Congressional Budget Office released a report which estimated that incrementally raising the federal minimum wage to $15 an hour by 2025 would increase the federal budget deficit by $54 billion over ten years by increasing the cost of goods and services paid for by the federal government.

== Commentary ==
=== Economists ===
Effective minimum wage adjusted for cost of living for select U.S. cities (2024)
| City | Effective minimum wage for workers (2024) |
|---|---|
| United States | $7.25 |
| Chicago | $15 |

According to a survey conducted by economist Greg Mankiw, 79% of economists agreed that "a minimum wage increases unemployment among young and unskilled workers."

A 2015 survey conducted by the University of New Hampshire Survey Center found that a majority of economists believes raising the minimum wage to $15 per hour would have negative effects on youth employment levels (83%), adult employment levels (52%), and the number of jobs available (76%). Additionally, 67% of economists surveyed believed that a $15 minimum wage would make it harder for small businesses with less than 50 employees to stay in business.

A 2006 survey conducted by economist Robert Whaples of a sample of 210 Ph.D. economists randomly selected from the American Economic Association, found that, regarding the U.S. minimum wage:

- 46.8% favored eliminating it
- 1.3% favored decreasing it
- 14.3% favored keeping it the same
- 5.2% favored increasing it by about 50 cents per hour
- 15.6% favored increasing it by about $1 per hour
- 16.9% favored increasing it by more than $1 per hour

In 2014, over 600 economists signed a letter in support of increasing the minimum wage to $10.10 with research suggesting that a minimum wage increase could have a small stimulative effect on the economy as low-wage workers spend their additional earnings, raising demand and job growth. Also, seven recipients of the Nobel Prize in Economic Sciences were among 75 economists endorsing an increase in the minimum wage for U.S. workers and said "the weight" of economic research shows higher pay does not lead to fewer jobs.

According to a February 2013 survey of the University of Chicago IGM Forum, which includes approximately 40 economists:

- 34% agreed with the statement that "Raising the federal minimum wage to $9 per hour would make it noticeably harder for low-skilled workers to find employment", with 32% disagreeing and 24% uncertain
- 42% agreed that "...raising the minimum wage to $9 per hour and indexing it to inflation...would be a desirable policy", with 11% disagreeing or strongly disagreeing and 32% uncertain.

According to a fall 2000 survey conducted by Fuller and Geide-Stevenson, 73.5% (27.9% of which agreed with provisos) of 298 American economists agreed that minimum wage laws increase unemployment among unskilled and young workers, while 26.5% disagreed with the statement.

Economist Paul Krugman advocated raising the minimum wage moderately in 2013, citing several reasons, including:

- The minimum wage was below its 1960s purchasing power, despite a near doubling of productivity;
- The great preponderance of the evidence indicates there is no negative impact on employment from moderate increases; and
- A high level of public support, specifically Democrats and Republican women.

American economist, novelist, and senior fellow at Stanford University's Hoover Institution Thomas Sowell has criticized minimum wage laws. In his book Basic Economics, he stated that "Unfortunately, the real minimum wage is always zero, regardless of the laws, and that is the wage that many workers receive in the wake of the creation or escalation of a government-mandated minimum wage, because they lose their jobs or fail to find jobs when they enter the labor force. Making it illegal to pay less than a given amount does not make a worker's productivity worth that amount—and, if it is not, that worker is unlikely to be employed."

=== Major political parties ===
Democratic candidates, elected officials, and activists support an increase in the minimum wage. In his 2013 State of the Union Address, President Barack Obama called for an increase in the federal minimum wage to $9 an hour; several months later, Democrats Tom Harkin and George Miller proposed legislation to increase the federal minimum wage to $10.10; and in 2015, congressional Democrats introduced a proposal to increase the federal minimum wage to $12 an hour. These efforts did not succeed, but increases in city and state minimum wages prompted congressional Democrats to continue fighting for an increase on the federal level. After much internal party debate, the party's official platform adopted at the 2016 Democratic National Convention stated: "We should raise the federal minimum wage to $15 an hour over time and index it, give all Americans the ability to join a union regardless of where they work, and create new ways for workers to have power in the economy so every worker can earn at least $15 an hour."

Most Republican elected officials oppose action to increase the minimum wage, and have blocked Democratic efforts to increase the minimum wage. Republican leadership such as Speakers of the House John Boehner and Paul Ryan have opposed minimum wage increases. Some Republicans oppose having a minimum wage altogether, while a few, conversely, have supported minimum wage increases or indexing the minimum wage to inflation.

In January 2014, seven Nobel economists—Kenneth Arrow, Peter Diamond, Eric Maskin, Thomas Schelling, Robert Solow, Michael Spence, and Joseph Stiglitz—and 600 other economists wrote a letter to the US Congress and the US president urging that, by 2016, the US government should raise the minimum wage to $10.10. They endorsed the Minimum Wage Fairness Act which was introduced by US Senator Tom Harkin in 2013. U.S. Senator Bernie Sanders introduced a bill in 2015 that would raise the minimum wage to $15, and in his 2016 campaign for president ran on a platform of increasing it. Although Sanders did not become the nominee, the Democratic National Committee adopted his $15 minimum wage push in their 2016 party platform.

=== Protests for increasing the wage ===
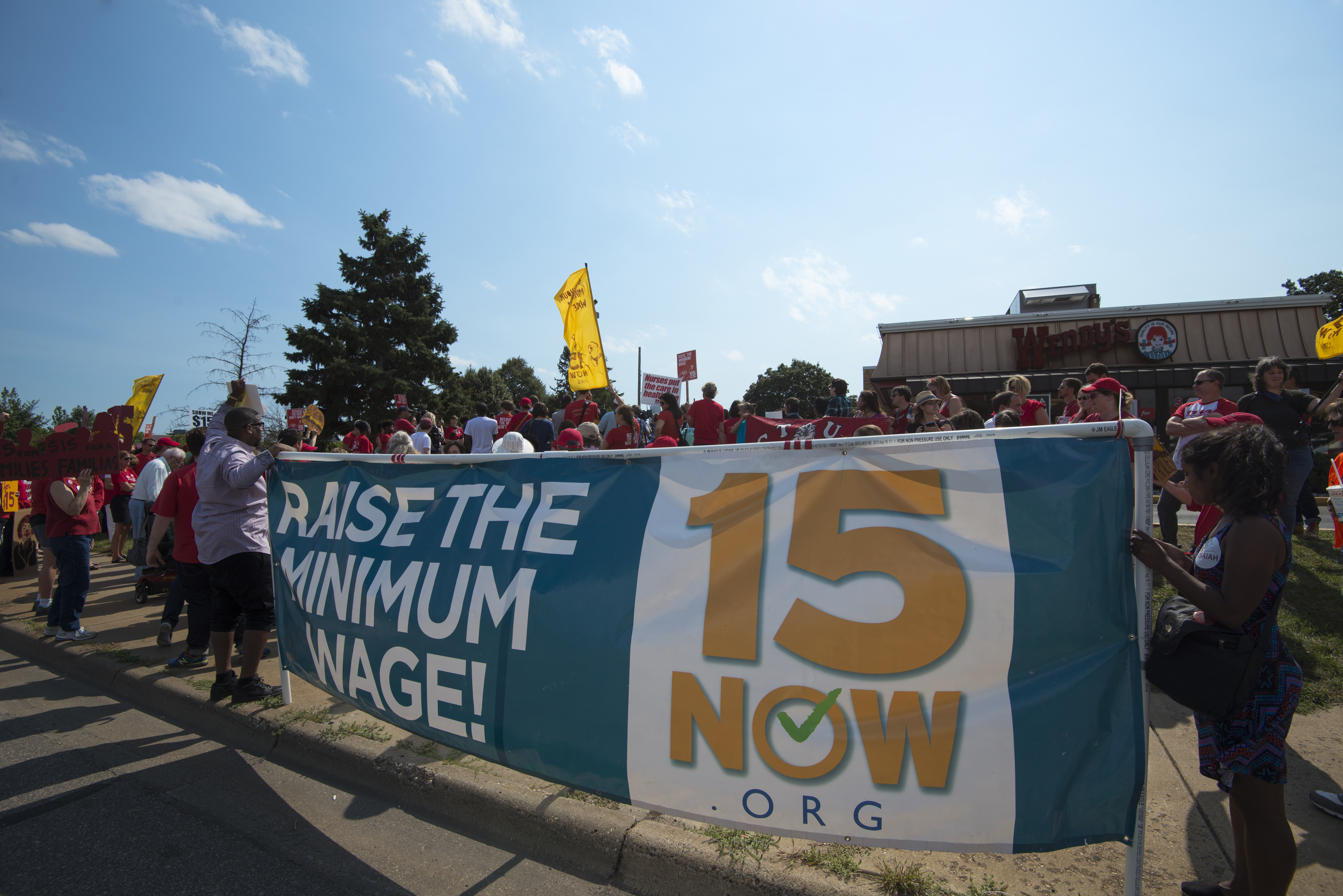
Protest calling for raising the Minneapolis minimum wage to $15/hour. September 12, 2016

Since 2012, a growing protest and advocacy movement called "Fight for $15", initially growing out of fast food worker strikes, has advocated for an increase in the minimum wage to a living wage. Since the start of these protests, a number of states and cities have increased their minimum wage. In 2014, Connecticut for instance passed legislation to raise the minimum wage from $8.70 to $10.10 per hour by 2017, making it one of about six states at the time to aim at or above $10.00 per hour. In 2014 and 2015, several cities, including San Francisco, Seattle, Los Angeles, and Washington D.C. passed ordinances that gradually increase the minimum wage to $15.00 per hour. In 2016 New York and California became the first states to pass legislation that would gradually raise the minimum wage to $15 per hour in each state, followed by Massachusetts in 2018.

In April 2014, the U.S. Senate debated the minimum wage on the federal level by way of the Minimum Wage Fairness Act. The bill would have amended the Fair Labor Standards Act of 1938 (FLSA) to increase the federal minimum wage for employees to $10.10 per hour over the course of a two-year period. The bill was strongly supported by President Barack Obama and many of the Democratic Senators, but strongly opposed by Republicans in the Senate and House. Later in 2014, voters in the Republican-controlled states of Alaska, Arkansas, Nebraska and South Dakota considered ballot initiatives to raise the minimum wage above the national rate of $7.25 per hour, which were successful in all four states. The results provided evidence that raising minimum wage has support across party lines.

In April 2017, Senator Bernie Sanders and Senator Patty Murray, backed by 28 of the Senate's Democrats, introduced new federal legislation which would raise the minimum wage to $15 per hour by 2024 and index it to inflation. The Raise the Wage Act of 2017, which was simultaneously introduced in the House of Representatives with 166 Democratic cosponsors, would raise the minimum wage to $9.25 per hour immediately, and then gradually increase it to $15 per hour by 2024, while simultaneously raising the minimum wage for tipped workers and phasing it out. The legislation was introduced according to Senator Bernie Sanders to make sure that every worker has at least a modest and decent standard of living.

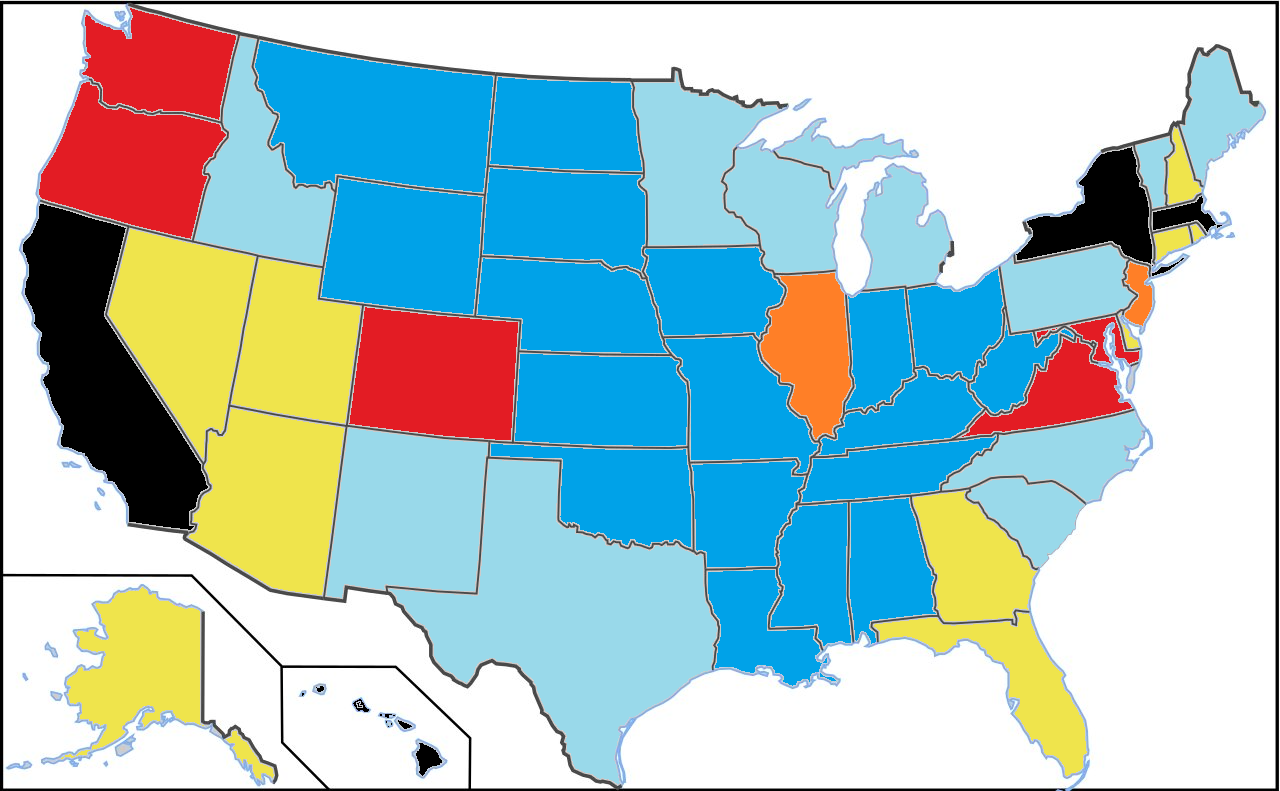
A heat map of the United States by living wage for a single, childless individual according to the MIT living wage calculator as of 2023: $15-$15.99 $16.00-16.99 $17.00-17.99 $18.00-18.99 $19.00-19.99 $20+

An increase to $15 per hour would cause widespread job loss according to former McDonald's USA CEO Ed Rensi. A $35k robot would be more cost-effective than a human fast food worker.

Following protests due to low wages and poor work conditions, Amazon raised the minimum wage for all its employees to $15.00 per hour in October 2018. The company subsequently became a major lobbyist for a $15.00 per hour minimum wage, which some observed as a way for the company to force competitors to increase their worker costs as well.

== Polls ==
In 2024 a Data for Progress poll found 80% of voters, including 75% of Republicans, support a $12 minimum wage. 64% of voters supported a $17 minimum wage.

The Pew Center reported in January 2014 that 73% of Americans supported raising the minimum wage from $7.25 to $10. By party, 53% of Republicans and 90% of Democrats favored this action. Pew found an ethnic difference for support of a higher minimum wage in 2017 with most blacks and Hispanics supporting a $15.00 federal minimum wage, and 54% of whites opposing it.

A Lake Research Partners poll in February 2012 found the following:

- Strong support overall for raising the minimum wage, with 73% of likely voters supporting an increase to $10 and indexing it to inflation during 2014, including 58% who strongly support the action;
- Support crosses party lines, with support from 91% of Democrats, 74% of Independents, and 50% of Republicans; and
- A majority (56%) believe that raising the minimum wage will help the economy, 16% believe it won't make a difference, and only 21% felt it would hurt the economy.

Regardless of the ruling, the idea of raising the minimum wage to $15 by 2025 from its current $7.25 is broadly popular, a Reuters/Ipsos poll found. Some 59% of respondents said they supported the idea, with 34% opposing it. When told that "raising the minimum wage should lift some families out of poverty, but government economists also expect it could eliminate some low income jobs, potentially making some families worse off," 55% of respondents said they supported it. About 40% of American adults said that they would benefit – either personally or through a member of their family – if the U.S. raised the federal minimum wage.

== List by jurisdiction ==
This is a list of the minimum wages (per hour) in each state and territory of the United States, for jobs covered by federal minimum wage laws. If the job is not subject to the federal Fair Labor Standards Act, then state, city, or other local laws may determine the minimum wage. A common exemption to the federal minimum wage is a company having revenue of less than $500,000 per year while not engaging in any interstate commerce.

Under the federal law, workers who receive a portion of their salary from tips, such as waitstaff, are required only to have their total compensation, including tips, meet the minimum wage. Therefore, often, their hourly wage, before tips, is less than the minimum wage. Seven states, and Guam, do not allow for a tip credit. Additional exemptions to the minimum wage include many seasonal employees, student employees, and certain disabled employees as specified by the FLSA. Some American corporations pay their disabled employees subminimum wages as low as $1 per hour, with these laborers rarely moving on to higher-paying jobs. At least 14 state governments have banned this practice for being discriminatory and exploitative.

In addition, some counties and cities within states may implement a higher minimum wage than the rest of their state. Sometimes this higher wage applies only to businesses that contract with the local government, while in other cases the higher minimum applies to all work.

=== Federal ===
| Type | Min. wage ($/h) | Notes |
|---|---|---|
| Tipped | $2.13 | The Fair Labor Standards Act of 1938 has required a minimum wage of $2.13 for tipped workers, with the expectation that wages plus tips total no less than $7.25 per hour, since September 1, 1991. The employer must pay the difference if total income does not add up to $7.25 per hour. |
| Non-tipped | $7.25 | Per the Fair Minimum Wage Act of 2007 (FMWA) since July 24, 2009. |
| Youth (First 90 calendar days only) | $4.25 | The Fair Labor Standards Act has, since August 20, 1996, allowed for persons under the age of 20 to be paid $4.25 per hour for the first 90 calendar days of their employment. |

=== State ===
As of August 2022, there are 30 states with a minimum wage higher than the federal minimum. From 2014 to 2015, nine states increased their minimum wage levels through automatic adjustments, while increases in 11 other states occurred through referendum or legislative action. Beginning on July 1, 2021, Washington D.C. has the highest minimum wages in the country, at $16.50 per hour. New York City's minimum wage for companies with 11 or more employees became $15.00 per hour on December 31, 2018. On the same day, NYC's hourly minimum wage for companies with 10 or fewer employees became $13.50. The minimum wage in Illinois reached $15 per hour in 2025.

In the state of Alaska, California, Minnesota, Montana, Nevada, Oregon, Washington, same minimum wage are applied for both tipped and non-tipped employees. Tips collected by employees in these states will not offset employer's obligation to pay the wage, and tips are additional income beyond the wage paid by employer.

Wages and tips by state
| State | Min. wage ($/h) | Tipped ($/h) (Note: Generally applies to employees who make over $30 in tips per month, unless otherwise noted.) | Youth/training ($/h) (Note: Applies to persons under age 20, for the first 90 days of employment (per FMWA), unless otherwise noted.) | Automatic indexed adjustment | Notes |
|---|---|---|---|---|---|
| Alabama | None (Note: No state minimum wage law. Federal rates apply, although some small businesses exempt from FMWA may not be covered.) | | | No | (Note: Local laws (including a local $10.10 minimum wage law passed by the City of Birmingham) were preempted in 2016 with the enactment of the Alabama Uniform Minimum Wage and Right-to-Work Act. The NAACP and two African-American Birmingham workers sued, arguing that the state's adoption of the preemption legislation violated the U.S. Constitution and the Voting Rights Act on the grounds that its passage "was rooted in the state legislature's racial bias against Birmingham's black-majority city council and citizens." In 2019, the U.S. Court of Appeals for the Eleventh Circuit held, in a 7–5 vote, that the plaintiffs lacked standing to pursue the case.) |
| Alaska | $14.00 | $14.00 | | Yes | (Note: Minimum wage increased to $14.00 on July 1, 2026. Same minimum wage for both tipped and non-tipped employees.) Subsequent increases are scheduled as follows: $15.00 on July 1, 2027; Adjusted annually based on the U.S. Consumer Price Index, beginning on January 1, 2028 |
| Arizona | $15.15 | $12.15 | | Yes | (Note: Voters passed Proposition 206 in 2016 scheduling a series of wage increases, starting on January 1, 2021 the minimum wage has been tied to inflation; it rose to $12.15 in 2021, $12.80 in 2022, and $13.85 in 2023.: Flagstaff: $18.35 effective January 1, 2026.; Tucson: $15.45 regular and $12.45 tipped effective January 1, 2026. Annual increases indexed to inflation.; Phoenix city employees: $15.00 for full-time workers effective May 1, 2019; extended to part-time workers November 2019.) |
| Arkansas | $11.00 | $2.63 | | No | (Note: Voters passed Issue 5 in 2018 to schedule a series of wage increases. Effective January 1, 2021, the minimum wage increased to $11.00.) |
| California | $16.90 | $16.90 | | Yes | Main article: Minimum wage in California In 2023, the California State Legislature passed a law on a new minimum wage for fast food workers at $20.00. The new minimum wage took effect on April 1, 2024. It affects the following restaurants: Has little to no table service; Part of a chain of at least 60 locations nationwide; Sells food and beverage for immediate consumption; During the same legislative session, the State Legislature passed 2023 SB 525 (Durazo) which increases minimum wages for healthcare workers to $25.00 per hour by June 1, 2028. |
| Colorado | $15.16 | $12.14 | | Yes | (Note: On January 1, 2026, the minimum wage increased to $15.16 and it will be adjusted with the Consumer Price Index yearly. (CPI) The tipped wage is $3.02 less than the minimum wage.: Boulder, Colorado: $16.82 since January 1, 2026.; Boulder County: $16.82 since January 1, 2026. Unincorporated areas only.; Denver: $19.29 since January 1, 2026.): Edgewater: $18.17 since January 1, 2026. |
| Connecticut | $16.94 | $6.38 | | Yes | In 2019, the Connecticut government passed a law raising the minimum wage to $11.00 on October 1, 2019. The minimum wage increased to $14.00 on July 1, 2022, and $15.00 on June 1, 2023. Starting on January 1, 2024, the minimum wage will be indexed to the Employment Cost Index. |
| Delaware | $15.00 | $2.23 | | No | Minimum wage increased to $15.00 effective on January 1, 2025. |
| Florida | $15.00 | $9.98 | | Yes | Florida's minimum wage increased to $10.00 and the tipped minimum wage to $6.98 on September 30, 2021. In November 2020, Florida voters passed a Constitutional Amendment which gradually raised the minimum wage to $15.00 per hour by 2026. After 2026, the minimum wage is increased annually on September 30 (effective January 1 of the following calendar year) based upon a cost of living formula (the Consumer Price Index for Urban Wage Earners and Clerical Workers, not seasonally adjusted, for the South Region or a successor index as calculated by the United States Department of Labor, using the rate of inflation for the 12 months prior to September 1). Minimum wage increased to $15.00 on September 30, 2026. |
| Georgia | $5.15 (Note: Federal minimum wage applies to businesses involved in interstate commerce, and to most businesses with gross revenues over $500,000, where state minimum wage is lower.) | $2.13 | | No | Only applicable to employers of 6 or more employees. The state law excludes from coverage any employment that is subject to the Federal Fair Labor Standards Act when the federal rate is greater than the state rate. |
| Hawaii | $16.00 | $14.75 | | No | Minimum wage increased to $16.00 on January 1, 2026. The "disability subminimum wage" (wherein disabled workers are exempted from standard minimum wage requirements) was repealed in June 2021. |
| Idaho | $7.25 | $3.35 | | No | |
| Illinois | $15.00 | $9.00 | $13.00 | No | The current Illinois minimum wage is $15.00. As of January 1, 2020, if a worker under 18 works more than 650 hours for the employer during any calendar year, they must be paid the regular (over 18 wage). Tipped employees earn 60% of the minimum wage (employers may claim credit for tips, up to 40% of wage) and there is a training wage for tipped employees. Certain employees must be paid overtime, at time and one-half of the regular rate, after 40 hours of work in a workweek. In February 2019, Governor J. B. Pritzker approved a statewide minimum wage rising to $15 by 2025. Increases began on January 1, 2020, to $9.25 and rose to $10 on July 1, 2020. The rate increased $1 each year until 2025, when it became $15.: Chicago: $17.05 since July 1, 2026. The base wage for tipped employees was formerly 60% of the non-tipped minimum rate, but is increasing by 8% of the rate per year until it reaches the equivalent level (currently 76%). Chicago's minimum wage increased to $14 an hour on July 1, 2020, and reached $15 on July 1, 2021.; The minimum wage for employees at O'Hare International Airport and Midway International Airport is $19.75 per hour, as of July 1, 2026, per city ordinance.; Cook County: $15.40 since July 1, 2026. The base wage for tipped employees is $9.25 since July 1, 2026. However, a large number of municipalities located within Cook County have opted-out of the county-level minimum wage ordinance. |
| Indiana | $7.25 | $2.13 | | No | |
| Iowa | $7.25 | $4.35 | | No | Most small retail and service establishments grossing less than $300,000 annually are not required to pay the minimum wage. A tipped employee who makes $30.00 per month or more in tips, can be paid 60% of the minimum wage, i.e. as little as $4.35 per hour. Increased minimum wage laws in Johnson and Linn counties were nullified by the legislature. While unenforceable by law, Johnson county continues to ask businesses to pledge to honor the minimum wage of $10.25 since January 1, 2019. Other places that have symbolic minimum wages include Linn at $10.25, Polk City at $10.75, and Wapello at $10.10. |
| Kansas | $7.25 | $2.13 | | No | Kansas had the lowest legislated, non-tipped worker minimum wage in the U.S., $2.65 per hour, until it was raised to $7.25, effective January 1, 2010. |
| Kentucky | $7.25 | $2.13 | | No | Louisville: $8.10 from July 1, 2015, and increases to $9.00 by 2017. However, the Kentucky Supreme Court ruled that localities do not have authority to increase the minimum wage. |
| Louisiana | None | | | No | |
| Maine | $15.10 | $7.55 | | Yes | The minimum wage increased to $15.10 and tipped minimum wage to $7.55 on January 1, 2026. The tipped rate is half of the current state minimum wage.: Rockland: Starting on January 1, 2026, for employers with more than 25 employees, the minimum wage will be $16.00. The minimum wage in future years be adjusted annually based on cost of living.; Portland: $16.75 as of January 1, 2026. |
| Maryland | $15.00 | $3.63 | | No | Minimum wage is $15.00 as of January 1, 2024. For employees working in Montgomery County, the minimum wage is $18.00 per hour for businesses with 51 or more employees, $16.50 per hour for businesses with 11 to 50 employees, and $15.95 per hour for businesses with 10 or fewer employees, effective July 1, 2026. County Council bill 12-16 was enacted on January 17, 2017, to adjust the minimum wage to $15 and base future adjustments on the Consumer Price Index, but was later vetoed by the County Executive.: Howard County: $16.00 since January 1, 2025 for businesses with 15 or more employees. |
| Massachusetts | $15.00 | $6.75 | | No | The minimum wage increased to $15.00 ($6.75 for tipped workers (defined as those in service work who make more than $20 in tips per month), $8 for many agricultural workers) on January 1, 2023. The "Grand Bargain" passed in 2018 raised wages on an annual schedule, phasing out time-and-a-half while prohibiting employers from requiring work on Sundays and holidays against employee wishes. |
| Michigan | $13.73 | $5.49 | $4.25 (training) $11.67 (youth) | Yes | Public Act 1 of 2025 was signed into law on February 21, 2025. It schedules the following minimum wage increases: Jan. 1, 2026: $13.73 regular, $11.67 youth, $5.49 tipped; Jan. 1, 2027: $15 regular, $12.75 youth, $6.30 tipped; There will be no increase in the minimum wage if the unemployment rate rises to or above 8.5% in the previous year. Tipped workers must earn at least the standard Michigan minimum wage once tips are included in their wages. The tipped minimum wage is set at 40% of the state minimum for 2026, followed by gradual increases to 50% of the state minimum by 2031. The youth rate is set at 85% of the state minimum. |
| Minnesota | $11.41 | $11.41 | $9.31 (for small employers; training; youth; and employees in J-1 status working for hotels, motels, lodging establishments, or resorts) | Yes | Beginning January 1, 2018, all minimum wage rates increase annually by the national implicit price deflator or 2.5%, whichever is lower. Overtime applies after 48 hours per week.: Minneapolis: $16.37, effective for all businesses January 1, 2026.; St. Paul: $16.37 for business with more than 100 employees; $16.37 for businesses with 6–100 employees; and $14.25 for businesses with 5 or fewer employees, effective July 1, 2026. |
| Mississippi | None | | | No | |
| Missouri | $15.00 | $7.50 | | Yes | On November 6, 2018, Missouri passed Proposition B, which increased the minimum wage. Effective January 1, 2021, the minimum wage increased to $10.30; $11.15 January 1, 2022; and $12.00 January 1, 2023. The minimum wage would afterwards be adjusted based on changes in the Consumer Price Index for Urban Wage Earners and Clerical Workers. A state law passed July 5, 2017 prevents Missouri cities and local governments from setting a higher minimum wage.: Kansas City set up a voluntary living wage program for employers to register. In 2022, the living wage is $15.00. |
| Montana | $10.85 | $10.85 | | Yes | Minimum wage rate is automatically adjusted annually based on the U.S. Consumer Price Index. Income from tips cannot offset an employee's pay rate while same minimum wage applied for both tipped and non-tipped employees. The state minimum wage for business with less than $110,000 in annual sales is $4.00. |
| Nebraska | $15.00 | $2.13 | 75% of federal minimum | No | Minimum wage increased to $15.00 January 1, 2026. |
| Nevada | $12.00 | $12.00 | | Yes | The minimum wage has been $12.00 since July 1, 2023. Employers who offer health benefits can pay employees $11.00. Assembly Bill 456, signed on June 12, 2019, raises the minimum wage in Nevada by 75 cents each year until it reaches $12 an hour. Employers who offer health benefits can continue to pay employees $1 per hour less at the Lower Tier rate. Same minimum wage for both tipped and non-tipped employees. |
| New Hampshire | $7.25 | $3.27 | | No | |
| New Jersey | $15.92 $14.20 (Agricultural) | $6.05 | $14.33 | Yes | Minimum wage increased to $15.49 on January 1, 2025. On January 17, 2019, Governor Phil Murphy and state legislative leaders passed an agreement to raise the minimum wage to $15 by 2024, with a bill to raise the minimum wage passed and signed by the Governor. There are four separate pay rates: regular employers, seasonal & small employers (6 & fewer employees), agricultural employers, and tipped workers. The general wage increase is TBD after 2024, TBD after 2026 for seasonal wages, and will stop at $5.13 for tipped workers in 2022, and is TBD in 2025. The minimum wage will increase in 2023 by an additional 13¢ in addition to its standard increases in pay rates due to an increase in the Consumer Price Index.: January 1, 2026: $15.00 seasonal, $14.20 agricultural; January 1, 2027: $15.00 agricultural |
| New Mexico | $12.00 | $3.00 | | No | Upcoming New Mexico minimum wage increases: Jan. 1, 2023: $12.00 regular $3.00 tipped; Albuquerque: $12.00 effective January 1, 2023. The minimum wage for tipped employees is $7.20; Las Cruces: $13.01 and the tipped minimum wage is $5.20 effective January 1, 2026.; Santa Fe County: $15.00 and the tipped minimum wage is $4.50 effective March 1, 2025. |
| New York | $17.00 | Varies | | No | A 2016 law changed the minimum wage over the next six years. "Downstate" includes Nassau, Suffolk, and Westchester counties.: As of January 1, 2026: NYC and Downstate employers: $17.00; Upstate employers: $16.00; As of January 1, 2025, the following is the minimum for exempt employees: NYC and Downstate employees $1,275.00 per week; Upstate employees $1,199.10. Hospitality Industry varies. As of January 1, 2026 they are the following: For fast food workers: NYC employers: $17.00; Downstate employers: $17.00; Upstate employers: $16.00; For tipped food service workers: NYC employers: $11.35; Downstate employers: $11.35; Upstate employers: $10.70; For tipped service workers: NYC employers: $14.15; Downstate employers: $14.15; Upstate employers: $13.30 |
| North Carolina | $7.25 | $2.13 | | No | The employer may take credit for tips earned by a tipped employee and may count them as wages up to the amount permitted in section 3(m) of the Fair Labor Standards Act. $15.00 minimum for full-time state employees, excluding temporary employees and public school and community college employees making below $15 (from July 1, 2018) Extended to non-certified educational staff and community college personnel from July 1, 2022.: Charlotte city employees: $19.04 for all regular hourly employees from July 2, 2022, with an increase to $20.00 from January 7, 2023.; Durham city employees: Latest living wage adjustment to $17.60, effective July 1, 2022.; Greensboro city employees: $15 (regular and benefits-eligible part-time employees, from July 1, 2018); Raleigh city employees: Universal living wage policy adopted January 17, 2017, with minimum wage increased to $13.76 and subsequent annual adjustments. Latest living wage adjustment to $18.20 for permanent, full-time employees, and to $11.00 for temporary positions, effective September 10, 2022.; Winston-Salem city employees: $14.31 (effective January 1, 2021) |
| North Dakota | $7.25 | $4.86 | | No | Tipped minimum is 67% of the minimum wage. |
| Ohio | $11.00 | $5.50 | $7.25 under 16 years old | Yes | The rate is $7.25 for employers grossing $405,000 or less. The rate is adjusted annually on January 1 based on the U.S. Consumer Price Index. Ohio's minimum wage increased to $11.00 ($5.50 for tipped employees) on January 1, 2026. |
| Oklahoma | $7.25 | $2.13 | | No | Minimum wage for employers grossing under $100,000 and with fewer than 10 employees per location is $2.00. (OK Statutes 40–197.5). |
| Oregon | $15.55 (non-rural counties) $14.55 (rural counties) $16.80 (Portland metro) | $15.55 (non-rural counties) $14.55 (rural counties) $16.80 (Portland metro) | | Yes | On March 2, 2016, Senate Bill 1532 was signed into law, increasing minimum wage depending on the county. Beginning July 1, 2019, the minimum wage increased to $11.25 for non-rural counties and to $11.00 for rural counties, thereafter increasing each year by fixed amounts until June 30, 2022, when the minimum wage will be $14.75 for the Portland metro area, $13.50 for other non-rural counties, and $12.50 for rural counties. Thereafter, the minimum wage will be adjusted each year based on the U.S. Consumer Price Index. Same minimum wage applied for both tipped and non-tipped employees. Non-rural counties are defined as Benton, Clackamas, Clatsop, Columbia, Deschutes, Hood River, Jackson, Josephine, Lane, Lincoln, Linn, Marion, Multnomah, Polk, Tillamook, Wasco, Washington, and Yamhill counties. Rural counties are defined as Baker, Coos, Crook, Curry, Douglas, Gilliam, Grant, Harney, Jefferson, Klamath, Lake, Malheur, Morrow, Sherman, Umatilla, Union, Wallowa, Wheeler counties. The Portland Metro rate ($1.25 over the non-rural rate) applies to employers located within the urban growth boundary (UGB) of the Portland metropolitan service district. |
| Pennsylvania | $7.25 | $2.83 | | No | On January 31, 2022, minimum wage for all state employees was increased to $15.00. A state law currently prevents cities and local governments from setting a higher minimum wage. |
| Rhode Island | $16.00 | $3.89 | | No | On May 20, 2021, Governor Daniel McKee signed a law raising Rhode Island's minimum wage to $15.00 on an annual schedule; tipped wages will remain at $3.89. |
| South Carolina | None | | | No | |
| South Dakota | $11.85 | $5.93 | | Yes | The minimum wage increased to $11.85 on January 1, 2026, and is indexed to inflation. |
| Tennessee | None | | | No | |
| Texas | $7.25 | $2.13 | | No | Applies to all workers in the state, excluding patients of the Texas Department of Mental Health and Mental Retardation who have diminished production capacity and who work on behalf of the department; their salary is calculated at the minimum wage times a percentage of their diminished capacity.: Dallas County employees: $15.00 (effective October 1, 2019). |
| Utah | $7.25 | $2.13 | | No | |
| Vermont | $14.42 | $7.21 | | Yes | Effective January 1, 2026, the minimum wage increased to $14.42 and the tipped minimum wage increased to $7.21. In future years, the state minimum wage will be indexed to increase with inflation. |
| Virginia | $12.77 | $2.13 | | Yes | The minimum wage in Virginia increased from $12.41 to $12.77 on January 1, 2026. Future minimum wage increases: January 1, 2027: $13.75; January 1, 2028: $15.00; Afterwards, the minimum wage will be re-adjusted by a Commonwealth Commissioner annually. |
| Washington | $17.13 | $17.13 | $14.56 | Yes | The minimum wage increased to $17.13 in 2026. It will be increased annually by a voter-approved cost-of-living adjustment based on the federal Consumer Price Index for Urban Wage Earners and Clerical Workers (CPI-W).: Bellingham: $19.13 since January 1, 2026.; Burien: $21.63 for businesses with 500 or more employees; $20.63 for businesses with 21 to 499 employees, since January 1, 2026.; Everett: $20.77 for businesses with more than 500 employees worldwide; $18.77 for businesses with 15-500 employees worldwide or an annual gross revenue over $2 million since January 1, 2026.; King County: $20.82 for businesses with more than 500 employees worldwide; $19.82 for businesses with 16 to 499 employees or an annual gross revenue of over $2 million; $18.32 for businesses with under 15 employees worldwide and an annual gross revenue under $2 million since January 1, 2026. Applies in unincorporated areas only.; Renton: $21.57 for businesses with more than 500 employees worldwide; $20.57 for businesses with 15-500 employees worldwide or an annual gross revenue over $2 million since January 1, 2026.; Seattle: $21.30 since January 1, 2026.; City of SeaTac: $20.74 for airport-related businesses, $20.10 businesses with 15–500 employees; since January 1, 2025.; Tukwila: $21.65 for businesses with more than 15 employees worldwide or an annual gross revenue over $2 million in Tukwila, since January 1, 2026. |
| West Virginia | $8.75 | $2.62 | | No | Minimum wage increased to $8.75 on December 31, 2015. The state minimum wage is applicable to employers of six or more employees at one location not involved in interstate commerce and for tipped employees is 30% of the federal minimum wage. |
| Wisconsin | $7.25 | $2.33 | | No | There is a special minimum wage for golf caddies: $5.90 per 9 holes and $10.50 per 18 holes. Another special minimum wage applies to camp counselors: $210 per week with board and lodging, $265 per week with board only, and $350 per week with no board or lodging provided. Governor Tony Evers has proposed legislation to increase the minimum wage for state employees to $15 by 2021, including employees at the University of Wisconsin-Madison. |
| Wyoming | $5.15 | $2.13 | | No | |

=== Federal district ===
| Federal district | Min. wage ($/h) | Tipped ($/h) | Youth/ training ($/h) | Notes |
|---|---|---|---|---|
| District of Columbia | $18.40 | $10.30 | $7.25 | In accordance with a law signed on June 27, 2016, the minimum wage increased to $15.00 per hour as of July 1, 2020; and $15.20 per hour as of July 1, 2021. As of each successive July 1, the minimum wage will increase by the Consumer Price Index for All Urban Consumers in the Washington Metropolitan Statistical Area for the preceding twelve months. The minimum wage for tipped-employees increased to $4.45 per hour as of July 1, 2019; $5.00 per hour as of July 1, 2020; and $5.05 per hour as of July 1, 2021. On June 19, 2018, Initiative 77 passed, increasing the tipped minimum wage to match the standard minimum wage by 2026. However, this was repealed by the D.C. Council before it could be enacted. The minimum wage established by the federal government may be paid to newly hired individuals during their first 90 calendar days of employment, students employed by colleges and universities, and individuals under 18 years of age. Initiative 82, nearly identical to Initiative 77, was passed on November 8, 2022, and came into effect on February 23, 2023. The law, now known as the District of Columbia Tip Credit Elimination Act of 2022, will progressively increase the tipped minimum wage by around $2 per year until it matches the non-tipped minimum wage in 2027. |

=== Territory ===
| Territory | Min. wage ($/h) | Tipped ($/h) | Notes |
|---|---|---|---|
| American Samoa | $5.38–$6.79 | $2.13 | Varies by industry. On September 30, 2010, President Obama signed legislation that delays scheduled wage increases for 2010 and 2011. On July 26, 2012, President Obama signed S. 2009 into law, postponing the minimum wage increase for 2012, 2013, and 2014. Annual wage increases of 40¢ recommenced on September 30, 2015, and will continue every three years until all rates have reached the federal minimum. |
| Guam | $8.25 | $8.25 | |
| Northern Mariana Islands | $7.25 | $2.13 | Under a 2013 law, wages were raised 50¢ annually until reaching the federal $7.25 rate in 2018. |
| Puerto Rico | $10.50 | $2.13 | Following the Fair Minimum Wage Act of 2007, Employers covered by the Federal Fair Labor Standards Act (FLSA) are subject to the federal minimum wage and all applicable regulations. Employers not covered by the FLSA will be subject to a minimum wage that is at least 70 percent of the federal minimum wage or the applicable mandatory decree rate, whichever is higher. The Secretary of Labor and Human Resources may authorize a rate based on a lower percentage for any employer who can show that implementation of the 70 percent rate would substantially curtail employment in that business. Puerto Rico also has minimum wage rates that vary according to the industry. These rates range from a minimum of $5.08 to $7.25 per hour. Following the enactment of the Puerto Rico Minimum Wage Act (Law 47 of 2021) there will be a yearly increase of the minimum wage from $7.25 to $10.50 per hour by July 1, 2024. Minimum wage increased to $8.50 on January 1, 2022, with subsequent increases for all employees covered by the FLSA as follows: $9.50 on July 1, 2023; $10.50 on July 1, 2024, The law also created the Minimum Wage Review Commission within the Department of Labor and Human Resources which will be tasked with reviewing and increasing the minimum wage yearly via decrees, and must meet monthly to evaluate the labor conditions in each economic sector. If by July 1, 2024, the Minimum Wage Review Commission decides the wage ought to be higher than 10.50, it will decree so. The law also provided employees of local businesses not covered by the Fair Labor Standards Act of 1938 with protections, and their wages, though not immediately increased by the law, will be evaluated and increased by the Review Commission. |
| U.S. Virgin Islands | $10.50 | $4.20 | The Virgin Islands' minimum wage increased to $9.50 on June 1, 2017, for all employees, with the exception of tourist service and restaurant employees (or those businesses with gross annual receipts of less than $150,000 set at $4.30). It further increased to $10.50 on June 1, 2018. |

=== Localities ===
Here is a current list of localities with minimum wages above their state minimum wage: Alameda, California; Bellingham, Washington; Belmont, California; Berkeley, California; Birmingham, Alabama; Boulder City, Colorado; Boulder County, Colorado; Burien, Washington; Burlingame, California; Chicago, Illinois; Cupertino, California; Daly City, California; Denver, Colorado; East Palo Alto, California; Edgewater, Colorado; El Cerrito, California; Emeryville, California; Flagstaff, Arizona; Foster City, California; Fremont, California; Half Moon Bay, California; Hayward, California; Howard County, Maryland; King County, Washington; Las Cruces, New Mexico; Los Altos, California; Los Angeles County, California; Los Angeles, California; Malibu, California; Menlo Park, California; Milpitas, California; Minneapolis, Minnesota; Montgomery County, Maryland; Mountain View, California; Nassau, Suffolk, and Westchester Counties, New York; New York City, New York; Novato, California; Oakland, California; Palo Alto, California; Pasadena, California; Petaluma, California; Portland Urban Growth Boundary, Oregon; Portland, Maine; Redwood City, California; Renton, Washington; Richmond, California; Rockland, Maine; San Carlos, California; San Diego, California; San Francisco, California; San Jose, California; San Mateo County, California; San Mateo, California; Santa Clara, California; Santa Fe City, New Mexico; Santa Fe County, New Mexico; Santa Monica, California; Santa Rosa, California; SeaTac, Washington; Seattle, Washington; Sonoma, California; South San Francisco, California; St. Paul, Minnesota; Sunnyvale, California; Tucson, Arizona; Tukwila, Washington; and West Hollywood, California.

== Large companies ==
Some large employers in the traditionally low-paying retail sector have declared an internal minimum wage often to make them more competitive in the labor market. As of 2020-2026:

- Amazon.com – $15/hour
- Bank of America – $17/hour
- Ben & Jerry's – $16.92/hour
- Charter Communications/Spectrum – $15/hour
- Costco – $15/hour
- Facebook – $15–20/hour depending on location
- Huntington National Bank – $16/hour
- JPMorgan Chase – $15–18/hour depending on location
- Target – $15/hour
- Walmart – $14–19/hour depending on location
- Wells Fargo – $15/hour

== Low-paying occupations: 2006 and 2009 ==
Jobs that a minimum wage is most likely to directly affect are those that pay close to the minimum.

According to the May 2006 National Occupational Employment and Wage Estimates, the four lowest-paid occupational sectors in May 2006 (when the federal minimum wage was $5.15 per hour) were the following:

| Sector | Workers employed | Median wage | Mean wage | Mean annual |
|---|---|---|---|---|
| Food preparation and serving related occupations | 11,029,280 | $7.90 | $8.86 | $18,430 |
| Farming, fishing, and forestry occupations | 450,040 | $8.63 | $10.49 | $21,810 |
| Personal care and service occupations | 3,249,760 | $9.17 | $11.02 | $22,920 |
| Building and grounds cleaning and maintenance occupations | 4,396,250 | $9.75 | $10.86 | $22,580 |

Two years later, in May 2008, when the federal minimum wage was $5.85 per hour and was about to increase to $6.55 per hour in July, these same sectors were still the lowest-paying, but their situation (according to Bureau of Labor Statistics data) was:

| Sector | Workers employed | Median wage | Mean wage | Mean annual |
|---|---|---|---|---|
| Food preparation and serving related occupations | 11,438,550 | $8.59 | $9.72 | $20,220 |
| Farming, fishing, and forestry occupations | 438,490 | $9.34 | $11.32 | $23,560 |
| Personal care and service occupations | 3,437,520 | $9.82 | $11.59 | $24,120 |
| Building and grounds cleaning and maintenance occupations | 4,429,870 | $10.52 | $11.72 | $24,370 |

In 2006, workers in the following 13 individual occupations received a median hourly wage of less than $8.00 per hour:

| Occupation | Workers employed | Median wage | Mean wage | Mean annual |
|---|---|---|---|---|
| Gaming dealers | 82,960 | $7.08 | $8.18 | $17,010 |
| Waiters and waitresses | 2,312,930 | $3.14 | $4.27 | $11,190 |
| Combined food preparation and serving workers, including fast food | 2,461,890 | $7.24 | $7.66 | $15,930 |
| Dining room and cafeteria attendants and bartender helpers | 401,790 | $7.36 | $7.84 | $16,320 |
| Cooks, fast food | 612,020 | $7.41 | $7.67 | $15,960 |
| Dishwashers | 502,770 | $7.57 | $7.78 | $16,190 |
| Ushers, lobby attendants, and ticket takers | 101,530 | $7.64 | $8.41 | $17,500 |
| Counter attendants, cafeteria, food concession, and coffee shop | 524,410 | $7.76 | $8.15 | $16,950 |
| Hosts and hostesses, restaurant, lounge, and coffee shop | 340,390 | $7.78 | $8.10 | $16,860 |
| Shampooers | 15,580 | $7.78 | $8.20 | $17,050 |
| Amusement and recreation attendants | 235,670 | $7.83 | $8.43 | $17,530 |
| Bartenders | 485,120 | $7.86 | $8.91 | $18,540 |
| Farmworkers and laborers, crop, nursery, and greenhouse | 230,780 | $7.95 | $8.48 | $17,630 |

In 2008, two occupations paid a median wage less than $8.00 per hour:

| Occupation | Workers employed | Median wage | Mean wage | Mean annual |
|---|---|---|---|---|
| Gaming dealers | 91,130 | $7.84 | $9.56 | $19,890 |
| Combined food preparation and serving workers, including fast food | 2,708,840 | $7.90 | $8.36 | $17,400 |

According to the May 2009 National Occupational Employment and Wage Estimates, the lowest-paid occupational sectors in May 2009 (when the federal minimum wage was $7.25 per hour) were the following:

| Sector | Workers employed | Median wage | Mean wage | Mean annual |
|---|---|---|---|---|
| Gaming dealers | 86,900 | $8.19 | $9.76 | $20,290 |
| Combined food preparation and serving workers, including fast food | 2,695,740 | $8.28 | $8.71 | $18,120 |
| Waiters and waitresses | 2,302,070 | $8.50 | $9.80 | $20,380 |
| Dining room and cafeteria attendants and bartender helpers | 402,020 | $8.51 | $9.09 | $18,900 |
| Cooks, fast food | 539,520 | $8.52 | $8.76 | $18,230 |

== See also ==
- Average worker's wage
- Fair Labor Standards Act of 1938
- History of labor law in the United States
- Income inequality in the United States
- List of countries by minimum wage
- List of countries by wealth per adult
- List of U.S. states by minimum wage
- Living wage
- Maximum wage
- Minimum Wage Fixing Convention 1970
- Minimum wage law
- Wage–price spiral
- United States labor law
- Wage slavery
- Wage theft
- Working poor
