= 2018 Arkansas Issue 5 =

Issue 5
- Issue No. 5: An act to increase the Arkansas minimum wage

Results
Choice	Votes	%
Yes	605,784	68.46%
No	279,046	31.54%
Valid votes	884,830	99.05%
Invalid or blank votes	8,447	0.95%
Total votes	893,277	100.00%
- County results For 70%–80% 60%–70% 50%–60%

2018 Arkansas Question 5 was a ballot measure in Arkansas held on November 6, 2018, to gradually raise the minimum wage in Arkansas to $11.00 an hour by 2021. It won by a wide margin, receiving over two-thirds of the vote.

== Contents ==
The exact text of the ballot measure read:

An act to amend the Arkansas code concerning the state minimum wage; the act would raise the current state minimum wage from eight dollars and fifty cents ($8.50) per hour to nine dollars and twenty-five cents ($9.25) per hour on January 1, 2019, to ten dollars ($10.00) per hour on January 1, 2020, and to eleven dollars ($11.00) per hour on January 1, 2021.

== Results ==
Issue 5
Choice	Votes	%
For	605,784	68.46
Against	279,046	31.54
Total	884,830	100.00
Valid votes	884,830	99.05
Invalid/blank votes	8,447	0.95
Total votes	893,277	100.00
