= Minimum Wage Fairness Act =

Bill of the 113th U.S. Congress

- Long title: To provide for an increase in the Federal minimum wage and to amend the Internal Revenue Code of 1986 to extend increased expensing limitations and the treatment of certain real property as section 179 property.
- Announced in: the 113th United States Congress
- Sponsored by: Sen. Tom Harkin (D, IA)
- Number of co-sponsors: 1

Codification
- Acts affected: Fair Labor Standards Act of 1938, Internal Revenue Code of 1986
- U.S.C. sections affected: 29 U.S.C. § 206, 29 U.S.C. § 203
- Agencies affected: Bureau of Labor Statistics, United States Department of Labor

Legislative history
- Introduced in the Senate as S. 1737 by Sen. Tom Harkin (D, IA) on November 19, 2013

The Minimum Wage Fairness Act (S. 1737) is a bill that would amend the Fair Labor Standards Act of 1938 (FLSA) to increase the federal minimum wage for employees to $10.10 per hour over the course of a two-year period. The bill was strongly supported by President Barack Obama and many of the Democratic Senators, but strongly opposed by Republicans in the Senate and House.

The bill was introduced into the United States Senate during the 113th United States Congress.

== Background ==
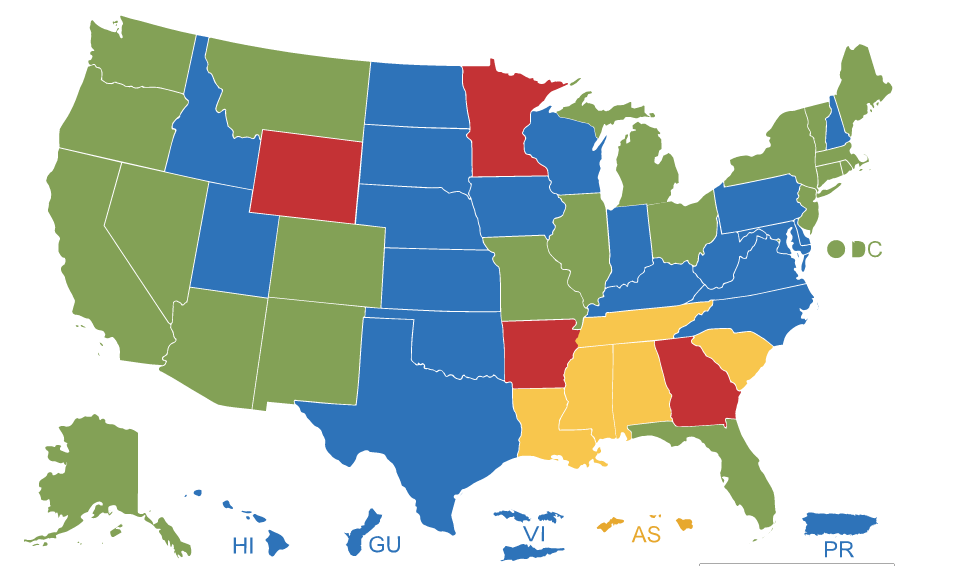
Minimum wage by U.S. state and U.S. territory (American Samoa, Guam, Puerto Rico, Virgin Islands), as of January 1, 2014. States with minimum wage rates higher than the federal rate States and territories with minimum wage rates the same as the federal rate States with no state minimum wage law States and territories with minimum wage rates lower than the federal rate Territory with varied minimum wage rates lower than the federal rate

In the United States workers generally must be paid no less than the statutory minimum wage. As of July 2009, the federal government mandates a nationwide minimum wage level of $7.25 per hour, while some states and municipalities have set minimum wage levels higher than the federal level, with the highest state minimum wage being $9.47 per hour in Washington as of January 1, 2015. Among those paid by the hour in 2013, 1.5 million were reported as earning exactly the prevailing federal minimum wage. About 1.8 million were reported as earning wages below the minimum. Together, these 3.3 million workers with wages at or below the minimum represent, respectively: 1.0% of the population, 1.6% of the labor force, 2.5% of all workers, and 4.3% of hourly workers. Many states already have a state minimum wage higher than the existing federal minimum wage.

The major economic schools of thought - Classical economics, Keynesian economics, and the Austrian School - disagree about the importance and the effects of the minimum wage. According to a paper written in 2000 by Fuller and Geide-Stevenson, 73.5% (27.9% of which agreed with provisos) of American economists agreed that a minimum wage increases unemployment among unskilled and young workers, while 26.5% disagreed with this statement. Some economic research has shown that restaurant prices rise in response to minimum wage increases. Overall, there is no consensus between economists about the effects of minimum wages on youth employment, although empirical evidence suggests that this group is most vulnerable to high minimum wages. However, new evidence for workers that were bound by the minimum wage suggests a distinct negative impact on employment and income growth.

== Provisions of the bill ==
This summary is based largely on the summary provided by the Congressional Research Service, a public domain source.

The Minimum Wage Fairness Act would amend the Fair Labor Standards Act of 1938 (FLSA) to increase the federal minimum wage for employees to: (1) $8.20 an hour beginning on the first day of the sixth month after the enactment of this Act, (2) $9.15 an hour beginning one year after the date of such initial increase, (3) $10.10 an hour beginning two years after such date, and (4) the amount determined by the United States Secretary of Labor (based on increases in the Consumer Price Index) beginning three years after such date and annually thereafter.

The bill would increase the federal minimum wage for tipped employees to $3.00 an hour for one year beginning on the first day of the sixth month after the enactment of this Act. The bill would provide a formula for subsequent annual adjustments of the minimum wage for tipped employees until it equals 70% of the wage in effect under FLSA for other employees.

The bill would direct the Secretary of Labor, 60 days before any increase in the minimum wage, to publish it in the Federal Register and on the United States Department of Labor's website.

The bill would amend the Internal Revenue Code to extend through taxable years beginning before 2017: (1) the increase to $500,000 of the expensing allowance for business assets, including computer software; and (2) the treatment of qualified real property (i.e., leasehold improvement property, restaurant property, and retail improvement property) as depreciable business property.

== Congressional Budget Office report ==
This summary is based largely on the summary provided by the Congressional Budget Office, as introduced in the Senate on November 19, 2013. This is a public domain source.

S. 1737 would amend the Fair Labor Standards Act (FLSA) to increase the federal minimum wage in three steps from $7.25 per hour to $10.10 per hour, and to adjust the wage annually thereafter to account for inflation. In addition, the bill would increase the federal minimum cash wage for workers who receive tips by gradually raising that wage until it equals 70 percent of the federal minimum wage for other workers. Finally, S. 1737 would amend the Internal Revenue Code to extend through 2016 an increased limitation on the amount of investment that firms can immediately deduct from their taxable income—a limitation that mostly affects small- to medium-sized businesses.

== Procedural history ==
The Minimum Wage Fairness Act was introduced into the United States Senate on November 19, 2013 by Sen. Tom Harkin (D, IA). On April 8, 2014, Senate Majority Leader Harry Reid announced that the Senate would not vote on the bill until three weeks later after a two-week April recess.

== Debate and discussion ==
The delay of the Senate vote on the bill was attributed to Reid's inability to get all members of the Democratic party in the Senate to agree to vote in favor of the bill. Senator Mark Pryor (D-AR) opposed the bill. Pryor was up for election in 2014 and was considered "the Senate's most vulnerable incumbent." Senator Tom Carper (D-DE) preferred legislation that would have a greater chance of becoming law, such as an increase to only $9 an hour. Senator Mark Warner (D-VA) expressed a willingness to negotiate with Republicans about some of the provisions of the bill, such as the timeline for the phase-in. Warner said that any increase needs to be done "in a responsible way."

Senator Mary Landrieu (D-LA) wanted additional debate on the timeline and the raise for tipped workers. Landrieu said that "I do not believe that $10.10 an hour is too high to aspire to, but how quickly we get there and what increments, the tipped wage, how that should be handled, who should get paid the tipped wage, and who shouldn't. There are a lot of questions about that, and some of those discussions are going on."

President Barack Obama strongly supported increasing the minimum wage, giving speeches about it urging Congress to take action. Obama argued that "if you pay people well, there's more money in everybody's pockets, and everybody does better."

The nonpartisan Congressional Budget Office said in a report that an "estimate half a million jobs would be lost if lawmakers passed the president's proposal" to increase the minimum wage to $10.10 an hour. Spokesman Brendan Buck for Speaker of the House John Boehner said in reaction that "the president's plan would increase costs for consumers and eliminate jobs for those who need them the most" so the House would "continue focusing on our plan to protect workers' hours and create jobs, not the president's plan to destroy them."

The National Retail Federation (NRF) opposed the bill, saying that "raising the standard of living for low-skill, low-wage workers is a valid goal," but that "there is clear evidence that mandate wage hikes undermine the job prospects for less skilled and part-time workers." The trade group also argued that this was the "least opportune moment" to increase the minimum wage because employers were still dealing the fallout of changes they needed to make because of the Affordable Care Act ("Obamacare").

Senate Republican Susan Collins (R-ME) tried to negotiate a compromise that centrist Republicans could agree to, but was unable to do so. Several Republicans, such as Senators Dean Heller (R-NV) and Rob Portman (R-OH), noted that their states already have minimum wages higher than the federally-mandated level and thought that the minimum wage should be left up to the states. Heller said "I think there is a difference between North and South, East and West on what those minimum wages ought to be." Senator Mark Kirk (R-IL) said he would not vote for the bill or a compromise. Collins' tried to argue that the Congressional Budget Office report predicting 500,000 jobs lost if the minimum wage was increased to $10.10 also said that an increase to $9.00 would only lead to 100,000 jobs lost, but the argument did not seem to persuade her fellow centrists. Collins said "I'm confident that the votes are not there to pass a minimum wage increase up to $10.10, therefore, it seems to me to make sense for senators on both sides of the aisle to get together and see if we can come up with a package that would help low-income families without causing the kind of job loss that the Congressional Budget Office has warned against."

== See also ==
- List of bills in the 113th United States Congress
- Minimum wage in the United States
