= California Child Actor's Bill =

Law applicable to child performers

California State Legislature
- Full name: California Child Actor's Bill
- Signed into law: 1939
- Code: California Family Code
- Section: 6752
- Website: Cal. Fam. Code § 6750, § 6751, § 6752, § 6753; Cal. Lab. Code § 1700.37

Status: Amended

The California Child Actor's Bill (also known as Coogan Act or Coogan Bill) is a law applicable to child performers, designed to safeguard a portion of their earnings for when they reach the age of majority, and protect them from exploitation and abuse.

The original Bill was passed in 1939 by the State of California in response to the plight of Jackie Coogan, who earned millions of dollars as a successful child actor, only to discover upon reaching adulthood that his mother and stepfather had spent almost all of his money. Since then, it has been revised a few times, most recently on December 7, 2019. As it stands, money earned and accumulated under a contract under the code remains the sole legal property of the minor child. The law requires a child actor's employer to set aside 15% of the earnings in a trust (often called a Coogan Account) and codifies issues such as schooling, work hours, and time off.

The current version of the law is codified in sections 6750–53 of the California Family Code and section 1700.37 of the California Labor Code. The law provides that any of the parties may petition a court to approve an entertainment contract, and if the court does so, somewhat different rules apply. Most importantly, the child cannot escape their responsibilities under the contract by disaffirming them, which a child normally has the power to do.

Later revisions extended the scope of minors' entertainment contracts that the court can approve, to include contracts according to which a minor renders services as an "actor, actress, dancer, musician, comedian, singer, or other performer or entertainer, or as a writer, director, producer, production executive, choreographer, composer, conductor, or designer." Under the current law, the court may also approve contracts that involve the transfer of intellectual property. In September 2024, California Governor Gavin Newsom signed an expansion to the law to cover child social media content creators.

== 2024–2026 Digital Media Expansions ==
In September 2024, Governor Gavin Newsom signed two laws extending financial protections to minors in digital media, effective January 1, 2025:
