= Industrial Welfare Commission =

The Industrial Welfare Commission (IWC) was established in 1913 to regulate wages, hours and working conditions in California. It was defunded by the California legislature in 2004 but its regulations consisting of 18 "Wage Orders" remain in effect, enforced by the California Department of Industrial Relations, Division of Labor Standards Enforcement.

IWC wage orders must be posted by all employers in an area frequented by employees, where they may be easily read during the workday.

== See also ==
- California Labor Code
- Minimum wage in California
