= Talent Agencies Act (California) =

The Talent Agencies Act. is a law in the U.S. state of California which sets regulations for talent agents. Noncompliance with the statute on the part of the agent allows actors, writers and other artists to disgorge their financial obligations by petitioning the California Department of Industrial Relations, alleging their talent representatives found them work without having a talent agency license. This may expose unlicensed personal managers to significant potential liability.

The Labor Commissioner's enforcement of the law led to personal managers forfeiting an estimated $500,000,000 in otherwise-owed commissions. These forfeitures are based on the authority given by a 1967 case, Buchwald v. Superior Court, 254 Cal. App. 2d 347, a suit initiated by the Jefferson Airplane founder to remove the contractual rights of its personal manager. Buchwald found that, "Since the clear object of the Act is to prevent improper persons from becoming artists' managers and to regulate such activity for the protection of the public, a contract between an unlicensed artists' manager and an artist is void.

However, Wood, Loving, Severance and Smith all hold that the only way an adjudicator has the authority to impair anyone's contractual rights is when there is a codified penalty provision. If the statute does not "declare that a contract made by any one in the conduct of the various businesses for which licenses are provided to be procured ... be invalid; nor is there any provision therein indicating in the slightest that this failure was intended to affect in any degree the right of contract." "The imposition by statute of a penalty implies a prohibition of the act to which the penalty is attached, and a contract founded upon such act is void." “If the statute does not provide expressly that its violation will deprive the parties to sue on the contract and the denial of the relief is wholly out of proportion to the requirements of public policy or appropriate individual punishment, the right to recover will not be denied.” “[I]t has been repeatedly declared in this state that ‘a contract made contrary to the terms of a law designed for the protection of the public and prescribing a penalty for the violation thereof is illegal and void, and no action may be brought to enforce such contract.’” Loving at 608.

As Justice Kathryn Werdegar wrote in Marathon v. Blasi, 42 Cal. 4th 974, 991 (2008): “The Act is silent – completely silent – on the subject of the proper remedy for illegal procurement. As the Act has no codified penalty, following Wood, Loving, Severance and Smith, Buchwald was a judicial error: it should have held that no adjudicator has the authority to affect the contract of an unlicensed representative. Had it been, none of the $500,000,000+ of monies that have been forfeited would have been.

When the National Conference of Personal Managers, a trade association of talent agencies, sued the State and the Labor Commissioner in federal court to enjoin enforcement of the law in 2012, the organization did not know to use the 'no penalty' argument. As presented, the case was dismissed, and the Ninth Circuit affirmed in 2015.
