= Berman hearing =

A Berman hearing is an administrative procedure under California law designed to resolve wage disputes between employees and employers efficiently and informally. Named after Howard Berman, the California State Assembly member who introduced the legislation, these hearings are conducted by the California Labor Commissioner’s Office to adjudicate claims related to unpaid wages, overtime, meal and rest period violations, and other compensation issues.

== Purpose and process ==
The primary objective of a Berman hearing is to provide a speedy and cost-effective mechanism for employees to pursue wage claims without the complexities of formal litigation.

The process begins when an employee files a wage claim with the Division of Labor Standards Enforcement (DLSE). The DLSE then notifies the employer and schedules a settlement conference to encourage resolution before proceeding to a hearing.

If the dispute remains unresolved, a Berman hearing is scheduled. During the hearing, both parties present evidence and testimony under oath before a Deputy Labor Commissioner, who serves as the hearing officer. The setting is informal, and strict rules of evidence do not apply, allowing both parties to represent themselves without legal counsel, though they may choose to have attorneys present.

== Outcomes and appeals ==
Following the hearing, the hearing officer issues an Order, Decision, or Award (ODA) within 15 days, detailing the findings and any amounts owed. Both parties have the right to appeal the ODA to the superior court within a specified period, typically 10 days. On appeal, the case is heard de novo, meaning the court reevaluates all evidence and issues afresh. Employers appealing the decision are generally required to post a bond for the amount of the award to ensure payment if the appeal is unsuccessful.
