= Minimum wage in California =

The statewide minimum wage in California increased on January 1, 2026, to $16.90. The same minimum wage applies for both tipped and non-tipped employees. The minimum annual salary threshold for employees classified as exempt from overtime increased to $70,304 ($5,858.67 per month), calculated at twice the minimum wage for full-time employment. At least 38 California cities have a minimum wage higher than the state minimum.

In 2023, the state increased the minimum wage for fast-food workers from $16 to $20 per hour, a 25% increase. The results were: a 13% increase in weekly earnings for workers, loss of 3% of fast-food jobs (while fast food employment grew by 0.8% nationwide), and an increase in fast food prices.

== By industry ==
=== Tipped employees ===
The same minimum wage applies for both tipped and non-tipped employees at the state level.

=== Fast food workers ===
In 2023, the California State Legislature passed a law on a new minimum wage for fast food workers at $20.00. The new minimum wage took effect on April 1, 2024. It affects the following restaurants:

- Has little to no table service
- Part of a chain of at least 60 locations nationwide
- Sells food and beverage for immediate consumption

==== Effects ====
A study published in April 2025 by Pepperdine University which used data from the California Employment Development Department found that California's 25% minimum wage increase for fast-food workers (AB1228) to $20 per hour (which went into effect in April 2024) caused employment in the fast food sector to decline by about 23,000 jobs, while fast food employment grew by 0.8% nationwide.

A study published in July 2025 by the National Bureau of Economic Research which studied the results of the above-mentioned law found that from September 2023 to September 2024 employment in the fast food sector declined by about 18,000 jobs, or -3.2 percent while the nationwide rate grew by +0.8% over that same period.

Other results from the 25% increase in the minimum wage for fast food workers were a 13% increase in weekly earnings, and an increase in prices.

=== Healthcare workers ===
In 2023, the State Legislature passed 2023 SB 525 (Durazo) which increases minimum wages for healthcare workers to $25.00 per hour by June 1, 2028.

== Municipal wages ==
At least 38 California cities have a minimum wage higher than the state minimum:

- Alameda: $17.46 since July 1, 2025.
- Belmont: $18.95 since January 1, 2026.
- Berkeley: $19.18 since July 1, 2025.
- Burlingame: $17.86 since January 1, 2026.
- Cupertino: $18.70 since January 1, 2026.
- Daly City: $17.50 since January 1, 2026.
- East Palo Alto: $17.90 since January 1, 2026.
- El Cerrito: $18.82 since January 1, 2026.
- Emeryville: $19.90 since July 1, 2025.
- Foster City: $17.85 since January 1, 2026.
- Fremont: $17.75 since July 1, 2025.
- Half Moon Bay: $17.91 since January 1, 2026.
- Hayward: $17.79 for businesses with 26 or more employees, $16.90 for businesses with 25 employees or fewer since January 1, 2026.
- Los Altos: $18.70 since January 1, 2026.
- Los Angeles: (City of Los Angeles – not including County of Los Angeles) $17.87 since July 1, 2025. Unions are exempt from the city of Los Angeles's minimum wage law.
  - Effective September 8, 2025, under the Citywide Hotel Worker Minimum Wage Ordinance, the minimum wage for hotel workers is $22.50 for employees who work in hotels with at least 60 guest rooms. If these employers do not provide health benefits, the wage is $30.15. This minimum wage will increase by $2.50 each July until 2028. The ordinance also applies to all hotels within the Airport Hospitality Enhancement Zone with at least 50 or more guest rooms.
- Los Angeles County: $17.81 since July 1, 2025. Unincorporated areas only.
- Malibu: $17.27 since July 1, 2025.
- Menlo Park: $17.55 since January 1, 2026.
- Milpitas: $18.20 since July 1, 2025.
- Mountain View: $19.70 since January 1, 2026.
- Novato: $17.73/hour for employers with 100 or more employees, $17.46/hour for employers with 26 to 99 employees, $16.90/hour for employers with 25 or fewer employees since January 1, 2026.
- Oakland: $17.34 since January 1, 2026; unions are exempt from Oakland's minimum wage law.
- Palo Alto: $18.70 since January 1, 2026.
- Pasadena: $18.04 since July 1, 2025.
- Petaluma: $18.31 since January 1, 2026.
- Redwood City: $18.65 since January 1, 2026.
- Richmond: $19.18 since January 1, 2026.
- San Carlos: $17.75 since January 1, 2026.
- San Diego: $17.75 since January 1, 2026.
- San Francisco: $19.18 since July 1, 2025 and adjusts with Consumer Price Index (CPI) increases July 1 each following year; unions are exempt from San Francisco's minimum wage law.
- San Jose: $18.45 since January 1, 2026; unions are exempt from San Jose's minimum wage law.
- San Mateo: $18.60 since January 1, 2026.
- San Mateo County: $17.95 since January 1, 2026. Unincorporated areas only.
- Santa Clara: $18.70 since January 1, 2026.
- Santa Monica: $17.81 since July 1, 2025.
  - Santa Monica matches the minimum hourly wage set for hotel workers in the City of Los Angeles. This ordinance applies to all large hotels and businesses operating on hotel property in the city. As of September 8, 2025, the minimum wage for these workers is $22.50 for employees who work in hotels with at least 60 guest rooms.
- Santa Rosa: $18.21 since January 1, 2026.
- Sonoma: $18.47 for businesses with 26 or more employees, $17.38 for businesses with 25 employees or fewer since January 1, 2026.
- South San Francisco: $18.15 since January 1, 2026.
- Sunnyvale: $19.50 since January 1, 2026.
- West Hollywood: $20.25 since January 1, 2026.

== See also ==
- California Labor Code
- Industrial Welfare Commission
