= Pin Point, Georgia =

- Map showing the location of Pin Point, Georgia
- Coordinates: 31°57′11″N 81°05′33″W
- Country: United States
- State: Georgia
- County: Chatham
- Elevation: 13 ft (4.0 m)
- GNIS feature ID: 332668

Pin Point is an unincorporated community in Chatham County, Georgia, United States; it is located 11 miles (18 km) southeast of Savannah and is part of the Savannah Metropolitan Statistical Area. Pin Point is 1 mi (1.6 km) wide and 1.6 mi (2.6 km) long, and lies 13 feet above sea level. The town is best known for its longstanding Gullah-speaking community, and being the birthplace of U.S. Supreme Court justice Clarence Thomas.

A rural settlement founded by freed people after the abolition of slavery in the United States post-Civil War, it was settled in the 1890s by people from nearby Ossabaw, Green, and Skidaway Islands. In 1897, they founded Sweetfield of Eden Baptist Church. In 1926, as part of a school-building initiative for African American children in the South—who at the time only had access to underfunded, segregated schools—a Rosenwald school was built in the Pin Point community.

The town lies on the edge of Shipyard Creek, a branch of the Moon River. The surrounding land has large oak trees and coastal marshes, as well as crab and oyster habitats. The main employer in the community was crab and oyster canning from the 1920s through the 1980s.

Pin Point remains a small, predominantly African American community that has a well-established Gullah community. The Gullah people have been able to preserve many cultural connections to their origins in West Africa, where many of their ancestors were captured and then enslaved in the United States.

Gullah, the only English-based, Afro-Indigenous creole language in the United States, is spoken in Pin Point. It is unknown how many native speakers there are in the town, but along the Southeastern seaboard there are about 5,000 semi-speakers and 300 native speakers. Supreme Court Justice Clarence Thomas is a native speaker of Gullah (then called Geechee). He has attributed his silence on the Supreme Court to his self-consciousness speaking in an all-white school as a teenager, where classmates made fun of him for not speaking "standard English". Pin Point Heritage Museum, once the Varn and Sons Oyster and Crab Canning Factory, is devoted to the Gullah/Geechee culture and community.

== Education ==
Savannah-Chatham County Public Schools is the school district for all of Chatham County.

== Notable people ==
- Clarence Thomas, U.S. Supreme Court justice
