= Daniel Tammet =

British writer and savant (born 1979)

Daniel Tammet FRSA
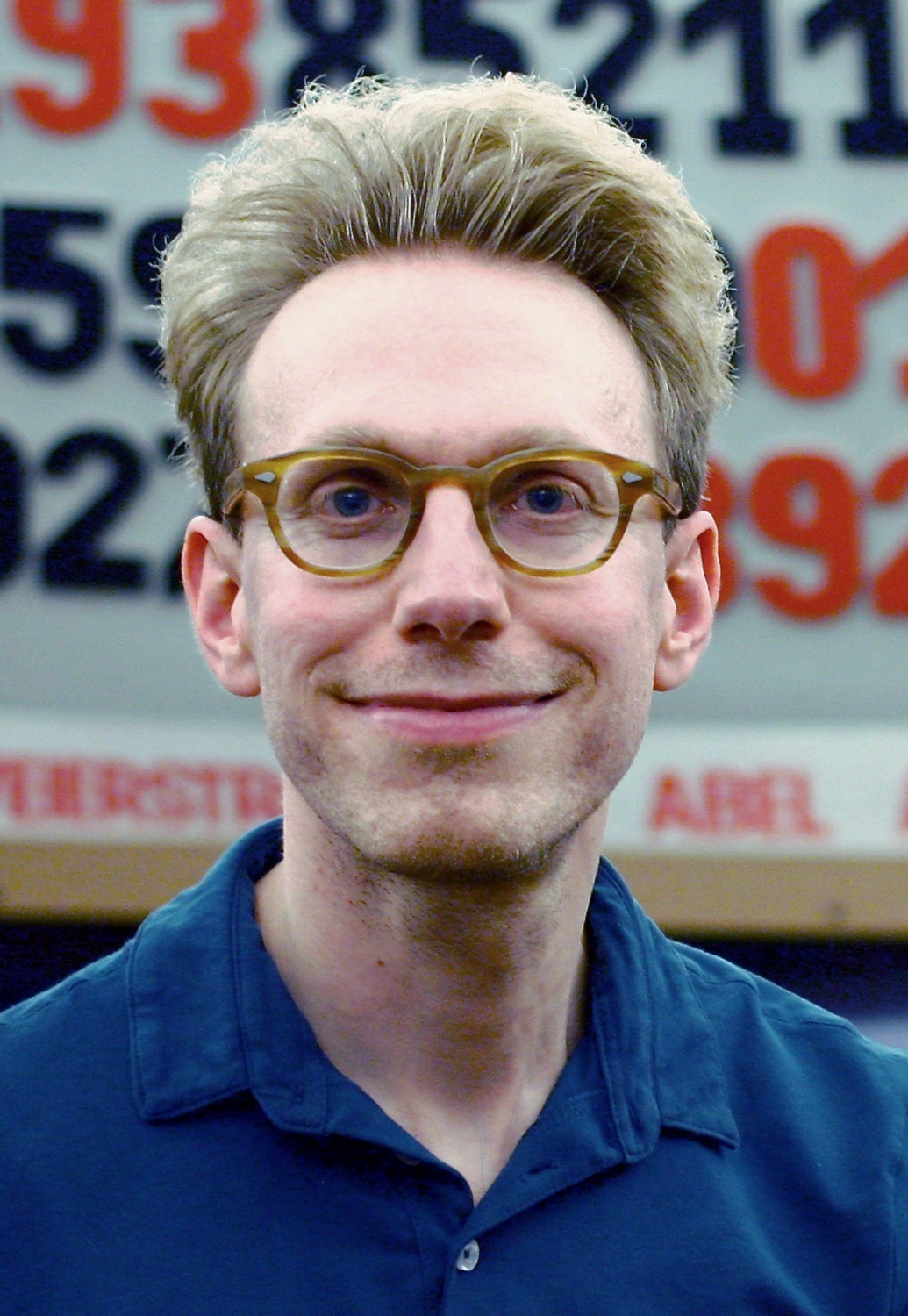
- Tammet in 2018
- Born: Daniel Paul Corney; 31 January 1979 (age 47); Barking, London, England
- Education: Open University
- Occupations: Essayist; memoirist; novelist
- Spouse: Jérôme Tabet
- Writing career
- Period: 2006–present
- Subjects: Memoir; essays
- Notable work: Born on a Blue Day (2006)
- Website: danieltammet.net

Daniel Paul Tammet (born Daniel Paul Corney; 31 January 1979) is an English writer and savant. His memoir, Born on a Blue Day (2006), is about his early life with Asperger syndrome and savant syndrome, and was named a "Best Book for Young Adults" in 2008 by the American Library Association's Young Adult Library Services magazine. Tammet's second book, Embracing the Wide Sky, was one of France's best-selling books of 2009. His third book, Thinking in Numbers, was published in 2012 by Hodder & Stoughton in the United Kingdom and in 2013 by Little, Brown and Company in the United States and Canada. Tammet's books have been published in over 20 languages.

Tammet was elected in 2012 to serve as a fellow of the Royal Society of Arts.

== Early life ==
Tammet was born Daniel Paul Corney on 31 January 1979. He was the eldest of nine children and was raised in Barking and Dagenham, East London. As a young child, Tammet had epileptic seizures, which remitted following medical treatment.

Tammet participated twice in the World Memory Championships in London under his birth name, placing 11th in 1999 and fourth in 2000.

Tammet changed his birth name by deed poll because "it didn't fit with the way he saw himself", according to The Guardian. He took the Estonian surname Tammet, which is related to "oak trees".

At age 25, Tammet was diagnosed with Asperger syndrome by Simon Baron-Cohen of the University of Cambridge Autism Research Centre. He is one of fewer than a hundred "prodigious savants" according to Darold Treffert, the world's leading researcher in the study of savant syndrome. Tammet was the subject of a documentary film titled Extraordinary People: The Boy with the Incredible Brain, first broadcast on Channel 4 on 23 May 2005.

== Career ==
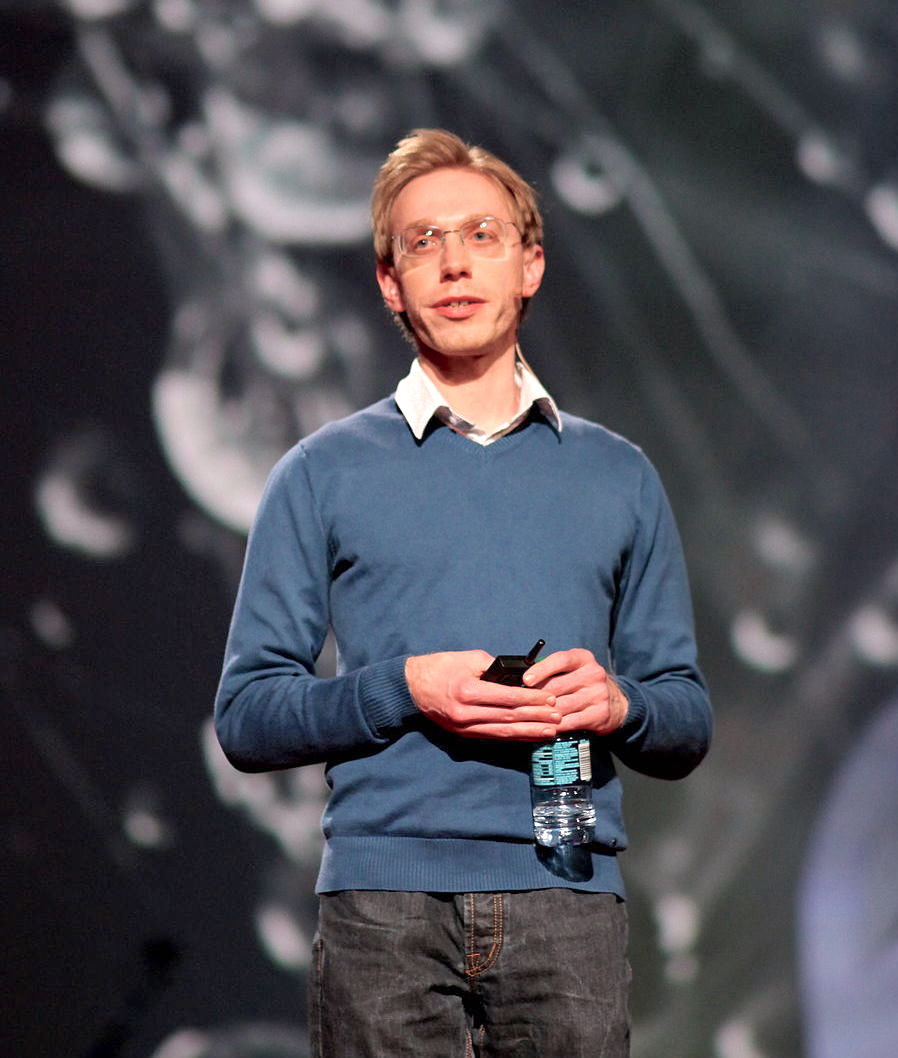
Tammet speaking at a TED event in 2011

In 2002, Tammet launched the website, Optimnem. The site offered language courses (as of 2015, French and Spanish) and had been an approved member of the UK National Grid for Learning since 2006. The website has been offline since January 2022, as of November 2023 redirecting to a "domain is for sale" page.

Born on a Blue Day received international media attention and critical praise. Booklist magazine contributing reviewer Ray Olson stated that Tammet's autobiography was "as fascinating as Benjamin Franklin's and John Stuart Mill's" and that Tammet wrote "some of the clearest prose this side of Hemingway". Kirkus Reviews stated that the book "transcends the disability memoir genre".

For his US book tour, Tammet appeared on several television and radio talk shows and specials, including 60 Minutes and the Late Show with David Letterman. In February 2007, Born on a Blue Day was serialised as BBC Radio 4's Book of the Week in the United Kingdom.

Tammet's second book, Embracing the Wide Sky, was published in 2009. Allan Snyder, director of the University of Sydney Centre for the Mind, called the work 'an extraordinary and monumental achievement'. Tammet argues that savant abilities are not "supernatural" but "an outgrowth" of "natural, instinctive ways of thinking about numbers and words". He suggests that the brains of savants can to some extent be retrained, and that normal brains could be taught to develop some savant abilities.

Thinking in Numbers, a collection of essays, was first published in 2012 and serialised as BBC Radio 4's Book of the Week in the United Kingdom.

Tammet's translation into French of a selection of poetry by Les Murray was published by L'Iconoclaste in France in 2014.

Tammet's first novel, Mishenka, was published in France and Quebec in 2016.

Every Word Is a Bird We Teach to Sing, a collection of essays on language, was published in the UK, US, and France in 2017. In a review of the book for The Wall Street Journal, Brad Leithauser noted that "in terms of literary genres, something new and enthralling is going on inside his books" and that the author showed "a grasp of language and a sweep of vocabulary that any poet would envy".

Portraits, a bilingual first poetry collection, was published in French and English in 2018.

Written in French as a letter to a non-believing friend, the creative non-fiction work Fragments de paradis ("Fragments of Heaven") was published in France and Canada in 2020.

== Scientific study ==
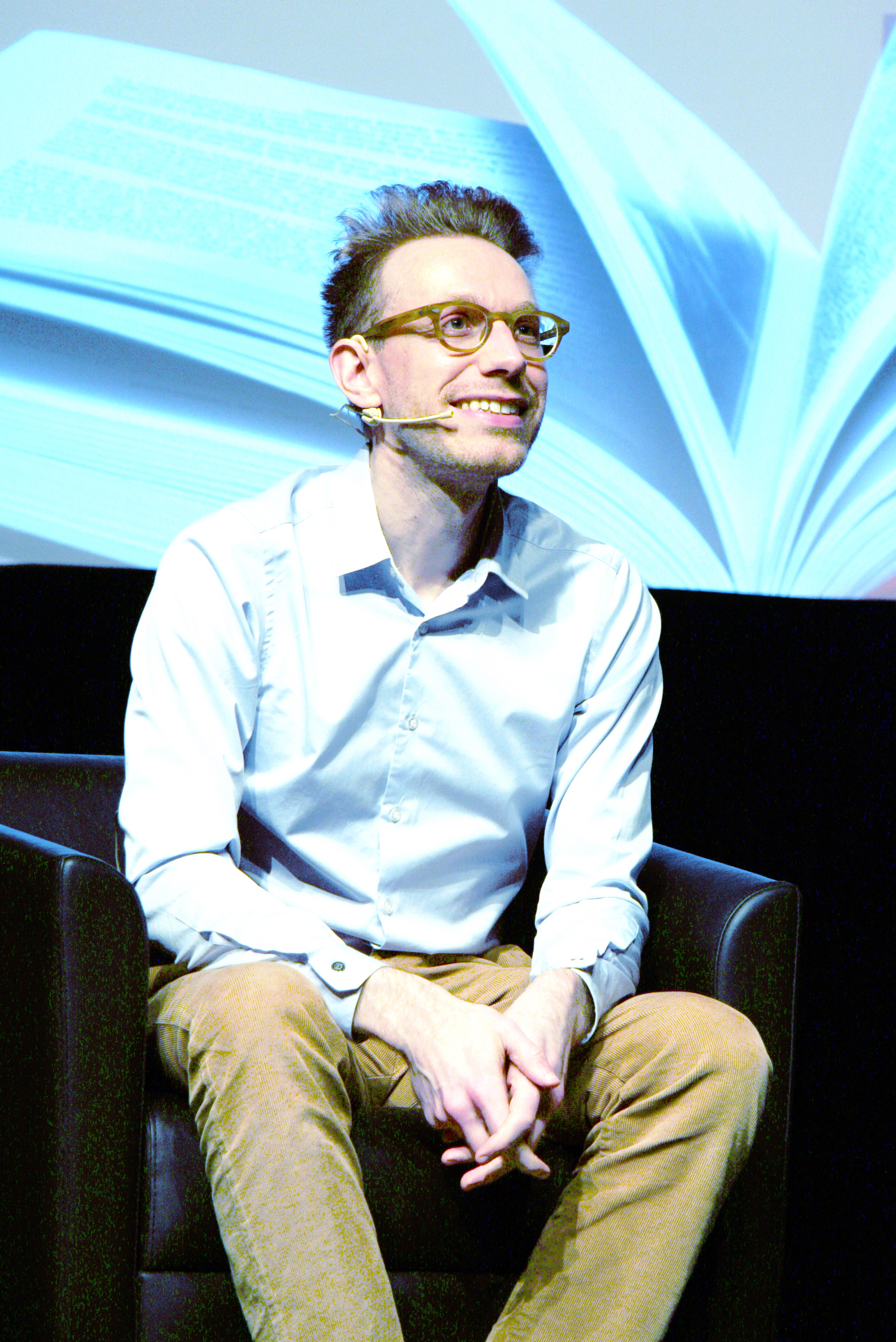
Tammet speaking in Montreal in 2016

After the World Memory Championships, Tammet participated in a group study, later published in the New Year 2003 edition of Nature Neuroscience. The researchers investigated the reasons for the memory champions' superior performance. They reported that he used "strategies for encoding information with the sole purpose of making it more memorable", and concluded that superior memory was not driven by exceptional intellectual ability or differences in brain structure.

In another study, Baron-Cohen and others at the Autism Research Centre tested Tammet's abilities in around 2005. Tammet was found to have synaesthesia, according to the "Test of Genuineness-Revised", which tests the subjects' consistency in reporting descriptions of their synaesthesia. He performed well on tests of short-term memory (with a digit-span of 11.5, where 6.5 is typical). Conversely, test results showed his memory for faces scored at the level expected of a 6- to 8-year-old child in this task. The authors of the study speculated that his savant memory could be a result of synaesthesia combined with Asperger syndrome, or it could be the result of mnemonic strategies.

In a further study published in Neurocase in 2008, Baron-Cohen, Bor, and Billington investigated whether Tammet's synaesthesia and Asperger syndrome explained his savant memory abilities. They concluded that his abilities might be explained by hyperactivity in one brain region (the left prefrontal cortex), which results from his Asperger syndrome and synaesthesia. On the Navon task, relative to non-autistic controls, Tammet was found to be faster at finding a target at the local level and to be less distracted by interference from the global level. In an fMRI scan, "Tammet did not activate extra-striate regions of the brain normally associated with synaesthesia, suggesting that he has an unusual and more abstract and conceptual form of synaesthesia". Published in Cerebral Cortex (2011), an fMRI study led by Jean-Michel Hupé at the University of Toulouse (France) observed no activation of colour areas in ten synaesthetes. Hupé suggests that synaesthetic colour experience lies not in the brain's colour system, but instead results from "a complex construction of meaning in the brain, involving not only perception, but language, memory and emotion".

In his book Moonwalking with Einstein (2011), Joshua Foer, a science journalist and former US Memory Champion, speculates that Tammet's study of conventional mnemonic approaches has played a role in the savant's feats of memory. While accepting that Tammet meets the standard definition of a prodigious savant, Foer suggests that his abilities may simply reflect intensive training using memory techniques, rather than any abnormal psychology or neurology. In a review of his book for The New York Times, psychologist Alexandra Horowitz described Foer's speculation as among the few "missteps" in his book. She questioned whether it would matter if Tammet had used such strategies or not.

=== Savantism ===
Tammet has been studied by researchers in Britain and the United States, and has been the subject of several peer-reviewed scientific papers. Allan Snyder at the Australian National University has said of him: "Savants can't usually tell us how they do what they do. It just comes to them. Daniel can describe what he sees in his head. That's why he's exciting. He could be the Rosetta Stone."

In his mind, Tammet says, each positive integer up to 10,000 has its own unique shape, colour, texture and feel. He has described his visual image of 289 as particularly ugly, 333 as particularly attractive, and pi, though not an integer, as beautiful. The number 6 apparently has no distinct image yet what he describes as an almost small nothingness, opposite to the number 9, which he says is large, towering, and quite intimidating. Tammet describes the number 117 as "a handsome number. It's tall, it's a lanky number, a little bit wobbly." He described David Letterman with the number 117 in these terms when interviewed on the Late Show with David Letterman. In his memoir, Tammet describes undergoing a synaesthetic and emotional response for numbers and words.

Tammet set the European record for reciting pi from memory on 14 March 2004 – recounting to 22,514 digits in five hours and nine minutes. He revealed in a French talk show on Radio Classique on 29 April 2016, that this event inspired Kate Bush's song "Pi" from her album Aerial.

Tammet is a polyglot. In Born on a Blue Day, he writes that he knows 10 languages: English, Estonian, Finnish, French, German, Lithuanian, Esperanto, Spanish, Romanian, Icelandic, and Welsh. In Embracing the Wide Sky, Tammet wrote that he learned conversational Icelandic in a week, and appeared on an interview on Kastljós on RÚV speaking the language.

== Personal life ==
Tammet met software engineer Neil Mitchell in 2000 and they started a relationship. They lived in Kent. He and Mitchell operated the online e-learning company Optimnem, where they created and published language courses.

In 2002, after attending the Herne Bay Baptist Church, Tammet became a Christian.

Tammet now lives in Paris with his husband Jérôme Tabet, a photographer whom he met while promoting his autobiography.

Tammet is a graduate of the Open University with a Bachelor of Arts degree with first-class honours in the humanities.

== Works ==
=== Non-fiction ===
- Born on a Blue Day (2006)
- Embracing the Wide Sky (2009)
- Thinking in Numbers (2012)
- Every Word Is a Bird We Teach to Sing (2017)
- Fragments de paradis (2020), in French
- How to be ‘Normal’ - Notes on the Eccentricities of Modern Life (2020)
- Nine Minds: Inner Lives on the Spectrum (2025)

=== Novels ===
- Mishenka (2016), in French

=== Poetry ===
- Portraits (2018), bilingual edition (English / French)

=== Essays ===
- "What It Feels Like to Be a Savant" in Esquire (August 2005)
- "Open Letter to Barack Obama" in The Advocate (December 2008)
- "Olympics: Are the Fastest and Strongest Reaching Their Mathematical Limits?" in The Guardian (August 2012)
- "What I'm Thinking About ... Tolstoy and Maths" in The Guardian (August 2012)
- "The Sultan's Sudoku" in Aeon digital magazine (December 2012)
- "Languages Revealing Worlds and Selves" in The Times Literary Supplement (September 2017)

=== Translations ===
- C'est une chose sérieuse que d'être parmi les hommes (2014), a collection of poems by Les Murray translated by Tammet into French

=== Forewords ===
- Islands of Genius (2010), by Darold A. Treffert

=== Songs ===
- 647: co-writer of the song with musician Florent Marchet on his Bamby Galaxy album (January 2014)

=== Short films ===
- The Universe and Me (2017) Collaboration with French film maker Thibaut Buccellato.

=== Mänti ===
Mänti (/ˈmænti/, MAN-tee) is a constructed language that Tammet published in 2006. The word Mänti comes from the Finnish word for "pine tree" (mänty, pronounced [ˈmænty]). Mänti uses vocabulary and grammar from the Finnic languages.

== Awards ==
- American Library Association Booklist magazine "Editors' Choice Adult Books" (2007) for "Born on a Blue Day"
- The Sunday Times "Top Choice of Books" for Born on a Blue Day
- American Library Association Young Adult Library Services magazine Best Books for Young Adults" (2008)
- Ann Arbor/Ypsilanti Reads "Selection for 2012" (2011)
- Fellow of the Royal Society of Arts (2012)
- American Library Association Booklist magazine "Editors' Choice Adult Books" (2017) for "Every Word Is a Bird We Teach to Sing"
- New Zealand Listener The 100 Best Books of 2017 for "Every Word Is a Bird We Teach to Sing"

== See also ==
- Derek Paravicini, savant pianist
- Solomon Shereshevsky, mnemonist and synesthete
- Stephen Wiltshire, savant with prodigious drawing ability and visual memory
