= Wawro =

Wawro is a surname. Notable people with the surname include:

- Geoffrey Wawro (born 1960), American military historian
- Megan Wawro, American mathematician and scholar of mathematics education
- Richard Wawro (1952–2006), Scottish artist
