= Serrell =

Serrell is a surname. Notable people with the surname include:

- Barney Serrell (1920–1996), American baseball player
- Edward W. Serrell (1826–1906), American civil engineer and Civil War veteran
- Orlando Serrell (born 1968), American acquired savant
- Philip Serrell (born 1954), British auctioneer, antiques expert and television presenter.
