= Brideun School for Exceptional Children =

Location
- 250 South Cherrywood Drive; Lafayette, Colorado; United States
- 39.973116°N 105.092474°W

Information
- Type: Elementary
- Opened: 2000
- Closed: 2006
- Chairman: Marlo Payne Rice
- Grades: K-8
- Website: link

Brideun School for Exceptional Children was a school for twice exceptional (2e) children in Lafayette, Colorado. It operated between 2000 and 2006 and received some national attention. It was the first elementary school in United States specifically founded for 2e students.
