= Richard Wawro =

Scottish painter (1952–2006)

- Born: 14 April 1952; Newport-on-Tay, Scotland
- Died: 22 February 2006 (aged 53); Edinburgh, Scotland
- Known for: Wax oil crayon landscapes
- Website: wawro.net

Richard Wawro (14 April 1952 – 22 February 2006) was a Scottish artist notable for his landscapes in wax oil crayon. He was an autistic savant.

== Life ==
Wawro was born, in Newport-on-Tay, Scotland, on 14 April 1952, the son of Tadeusz and Olive Wawro; his father was a former Polish military officer and civil engineer who had settled as a librarian in Fife, Scotland and his mother a Scottish primary school teacher. He was diagnosed as "moderately to severely retarded" at the age of three, a condition later recognised as autism. He did not learn to speak before the age of 11 and required eye surgery to remove cataracts, which left him with sufficiently poor eyesight to be classed as legally blind.

As a toddler, Wawro began to draw on a chalkboard. At the age of six, his mother brought him to Molly Leishman, in the local children's centre, a special needs teacher who noticed his fascination with light and reflections. She introduced him to wax crayons, the medium in which he would work in for the rest of his life. Initially, his drawings were simple scribbles, much like those of his peers. But soon his scribbles began to evolve into recognisable images, with an unexpected level of detail and sophistication. His talent was recognised soon after. Professor Marian Bohusz-Szyszko of the Polish School of Art, London, said he was "thunderstruck" at Wawro's drawings, describing them as "an incredible phenomenon rendered with the precision of a mechanic and the vision of a poet". He was considered to be an autistic savant.

In 1970 the Edinburgh impresario Richard Demarco "discovered" Wawro, then aged 17, and exhibited his works in his gallery. His story was presented on the BBC's Nationwide television programme. The report was shown a second time as one of the programme's highlights of that year. In the early 1970s one of his London exhibitions was opened by Margaret Thatcher, then Education Minister, who bought several of his pictures, as did Pope John Paul II.

He got his father's approval for each picture until his father died in 2002. Overall he sold more than 1,000 pictures in around 100 exhibitions.

His original art was first introduced in the United States in 1977 at a National Council of Teachers of English conference on Creativity for the Gifted and Talented in New York City. In 1983 his life and work were the subject of a documentary film, With Eyes Wide Open, by the autism expert Laurence A. Becker, Ph.D. who also produced a video profile of him, A Real Rainman.

Wawro died in Edinburgh of lung cancer on 22 February 2006.

== Works ==
Wawro worked in the unusual medium of wax oil crayon, specialising in landscapes and seascapes that were acclaimed for their highly detailed and dramatic images of intense depth and colour. He used no models, but drew from images seen only once, such as in books or on television; his phenomenal memory enabled him to recall where he drew each picture and to date it precisely in his mind. Although possessing perfect recall, he often added his own touches to the images. He was particularly inspired by light, and the tones he used to capture light and shadows are considered masterly.

A collection of nine of Wawro's drawings was featured on an episode of BBC's Antiques Roadshow, filmed at Thirlestane Castle and broadcast on 22 September 2024. Wawro's brother gave some biographical information.

== See also ==
- Stephen Wiltshire

== Other sources ==
- Treffert, Darold A. and Gregory L. Wallace (January 2004). "Islands of Genius - Artistic brilliance and a dazzling memory can sometimes accompany autism and other developmental disorders". Scientific American.
- Treffert, Darold A. "Richard Wawro - An Amazing Artist". Wisconsin Medical Society.
