= Orlando Serrell =

American savant

Orlando L. Serrell (born 1968) is an American "acquired savant" — someone who exhibits savant skills after central nervous system (CNS) injury or disease, as distinguished from a person born with autistic disorder or other developmental disability.

== Acquisition and abilities ==
Serrell did not possess any special skills until he was struck by a baseball on the left side of his head on August 17, 1979, when he was ten years old. Serrell fell to the ground, but eventually recovered and continued playing baseball. He did not seek any medical treatment because he did not tell his parents; for a long while, he suffered from a headache. Eventually, the headache ended, but Serrell soon noticed he had the ability to perform calendrical calculations of amazing complexity. He can also recall the weather, as well as (to a varying degree) where he was and what he has done for every day since the accident.

== Personal life ==
Serrell resides in Newport News, Virginia.
