= Derek Amato =

American musical savant

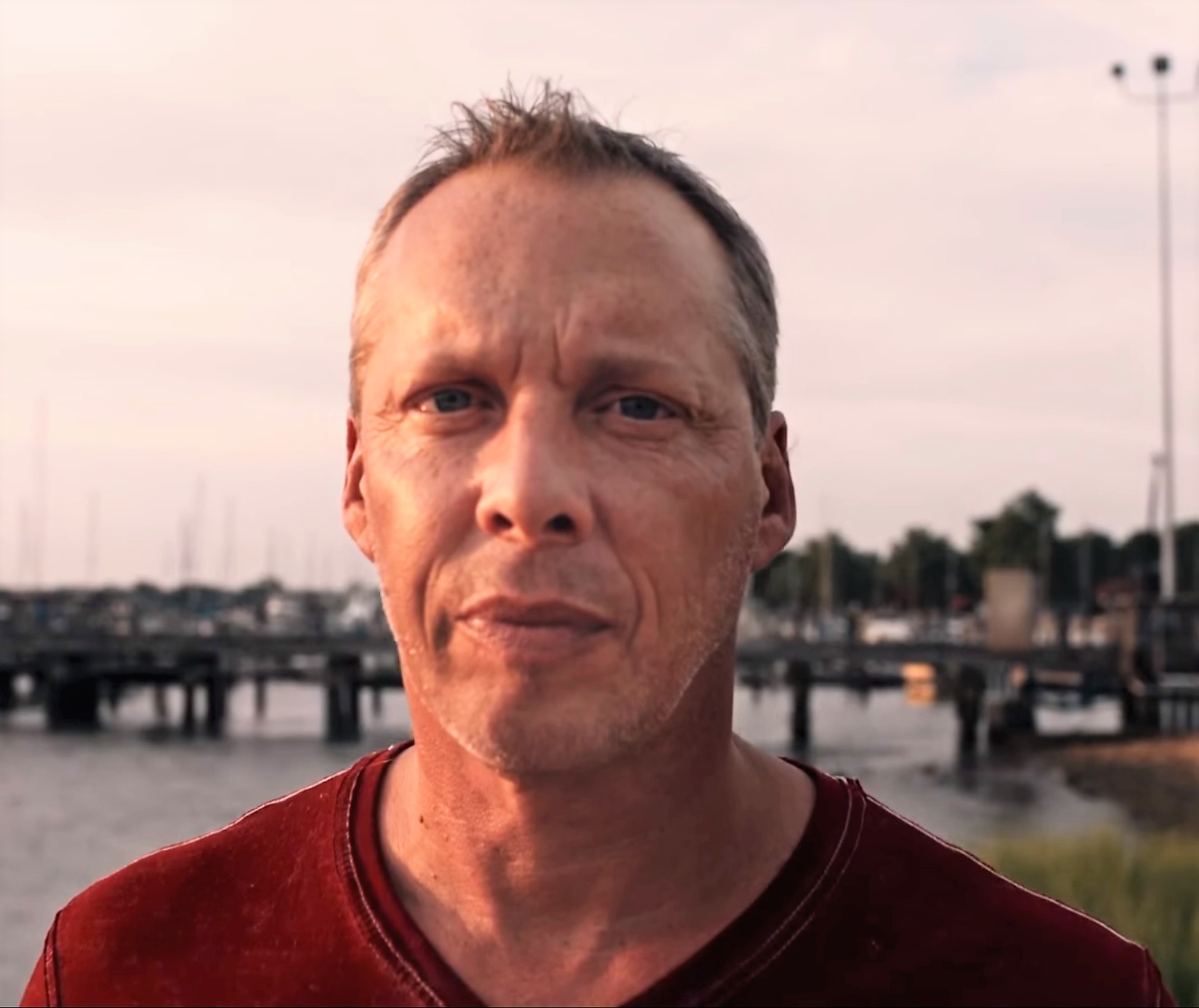
Amato on Uproxx in 2016

Derek Amato (born November 19, 1966) is an American composer and pianist who sustained a head injury on October 27, 2006, and subsequently became a musical savant.

At the age of 39, Amato dove into a shallow swimming pool and hit his head, resulting in a major concussion and 35% hearing loss. Although he had played the guitar prior to his injury, the level of his musical ability suddenly progressed to the point where he was able to compose for piano. He has been diagnosed as experiencing a form of synesthesia.
