= Twice exceptional =

Term used for a gifted student who also possesses at least one disability

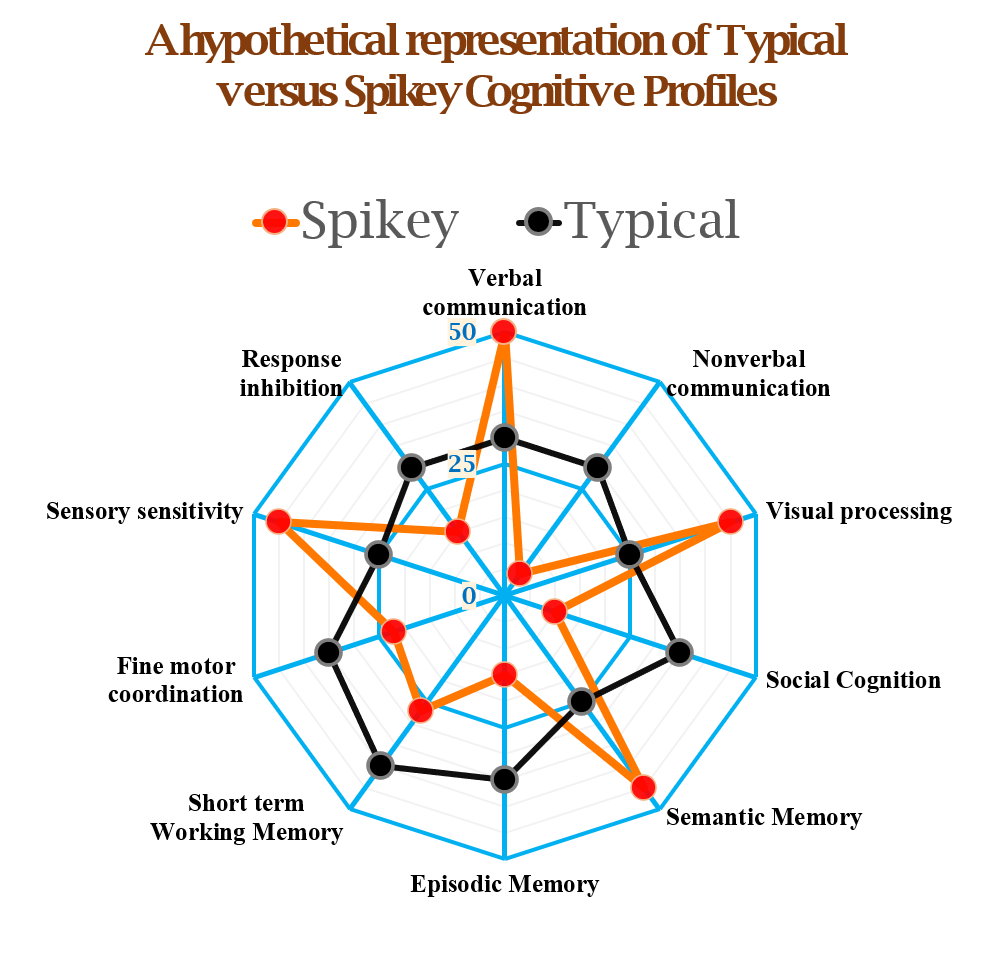
A hypothetical radar plot of spikey cognitive profile. Similar details can be found in Doyle, Nancy. "Neurodiversity at work: a biopsychosocial model and the impact on working adults." British medical bulletin 135, no. 1 (2020): 108-125.

The term twice-exceptional or 2e refers to individuals acknowledged as gifted and neurodivergent. As a literal interpretation implies, it means a student is simultaneously very strong or gifted at some task but also very weak or incapable of another task. Due to this duality of twice-exceptional people's cognitive profiles, their strengths, weaknesses, and struggles may remain unnoticed or unsupported. Because of the relative apparentness of precocious developments, such as hyperlexia, compared to subtler difficulties which can appear in day-to-day tasks, these people may frequently face seemingly contradictory situations which lead to disbelief, judgements, alienation, and other forms of epistemic injustice. Some related terms are "performance discrepancy", "cognitive discrepancy", "uneven cognitive profile", and "spikey profile". Due to simultaneous combination of abilities and inabilities, these people do not often fit into an age-appropriate or socially-appropriate role.

An extreme form of twice-exceptionalism is Savant syndrome. The individuals often identify with the description of twice-exceptional due to their unique combination of exceptional abilities and neurodivergent traits. The term "twice-exceptional" first appeared in James J. Gallagher's 1988 article "National Agenda for Educating Gifted Students: Statement of Priorities". Twice-exceptional individuals embody two distinct forms of exceptionalism: one being giftedness and the other including at least one aspect of neurodivergence. Giftedness is often defined in various ways and is influenced by entities ranging from local educational boards to national governments. However, one constant among every definition is that a gifted individual has high ability compared to neurotypical peers of similar age. The term neurodivergent describes an individual whose cognitive processes differ from those considered neurotypical and who possesses strengths that exceed beyond the neurotypical population. Therefore, the non-clinical designation of twice-exceptional identifies a gifted person with at least one neurodivergent trait.

== Misunderstood children ==
Brody and Mills [1997] argue that this population of students "could be considered the most misunderstood of all exceptionalities". In each situation, the twice-exceptional student's strengths help to compensate for deficits; the deficits, on the other hand, make the child's strengths less apparent. Although, currently there is no empirical research to confirm this theory. The interplay of exceptional strengths and weaknesses in a single individual results in inconsistent performance. They might present any of the three profiles identified by educator and researcher Susan Baum:

- Bright but not trying hard enough
- Learning disabled but with no exceptional abilities
- Average

In the case of behavioral/socio-emotional, rather than cognitive problems, both strengths and deficits can be intensified. A twice-exceptional student's grades commonly alternate between high and low, even within the same subject. The child might have advanced vocabulary and ideas, but be unable to organize those ideas and express them on paper. They might be a skilled artist or builder, but turn in assignments that are messy or illegible. They might complete assignments, but lose or forget to submit. To the parents and teachers observing this behavior, it may seem that the child isn't trying; many twice-exceptional children work as hard or harder than others, but with less to show for their efforts. This struggle to accomplish tasks that appear easy for other students can leave twice-exceptional children frustrated, anxious, and depressed. It can rob them of their enthusiasm and energy for school and damage their self-esteem.

Some other common situations may involve some amazing performance or contributions by such individuals being mistakenly distrusted, discredited, or undervalued because they are not known to be brilliant in other areas, or because they are far ahead of their peers in some aspects. For example, Tesla's autobiography describes his enthusiasm for solving advanced integral-calculus problems at the Austrian Polytechnic in Graz, while his biographer John J. O'Neill recounted that Tesla could perform arithmetic and algebra calculations mentally so rapidly that some teachers initially questioned whether he had obtained the answers honestly before accepting his unusual ability.

Similarly, some twice-exceptional students may not fully reveal their abilities and interests due to a learning environment which does not accommodate either their creativity or alternative ways of demonstrating knowledge. Critics of "high-functioning" and "low-functioning" labels have argued that such terminology may obscure important aspects of a given individual's abilities and support needs, since the former label may minimize the challenges experienced by individuals with relatively strong cognitive or verbal abilities, whereas the latter label may overlook the abilities and potential of individuals who require greater support.

The related disability rights and inclusive education principle of presuming competence argues that individuals should not be assumed incapable because of communication differences or support needs. Research on inclusive education interventions, such as Beyond Access, has examined approaches intended to both increase educators' perceptions of the competence of students with intellectual and developmental disabilities, and promote their inclusion in general education classrooms.

== Identifying twice exceptionality ==
Formal identification of twice exceptionality requires identification and formal clinical diagnosis of each of at least two separate underlying exceptionalities. Given the statistical rarity, wide variety of presentations, and practical access issues with obtaining adequate diagnostic assessments, it is not unusual for 2e children or adults in open society to have not been accurately identified or adequately diagnosed.

Children identified as twice exceptional can exhibit a wide range of traits, many of them typical of gifted children. Like those who are gifted, twice-exceptional children often show greater asynchrony than average children (that is, a larger gap between their mental age and physical age). They are often intense and highly sensitive to their emotional and physical environments. The following chart summarizes characteristics commonly seen in this population.

Some common characteristics of twice-exceptional children
Strengths	Deficits
Superior vocabulary	Poor social skills
Advanced ideas and opinions	High sensitivity to criticism
High levels of creativity and problem-solving ability	Lack of organizational and study skills
Extremely curious and inquisitive	Discrepant verbal and performance skills
Very imaginative and resourceful	Manipulative
Wide range of interests not related to school	Poor performance in one or more academic areas
Penetrating insight into complex issues	Difficulty with written expression
Specific talent or consuming interest area	Stubborn, opinionated demeanor
Sophisticated sense of humor	High impulsivity

Twice exceptionality often does not show up until children are in school. In their early years, these children often seem very bright, with varied interests and advanced vocabularies (particularly with reference to same-age peers); and many times parents are unaware that they have a child with 2e. Teachers sometimes spot problems in school; sometimes parents are the first to notice their children's frustrations with school. During the early years it may be social difficulties. The 2e child may find it hard to make friends and fit in. Academic problems often appear later. As work demands increase, teachers may see a drop or inconsistencies in the student's performance, sometimes accompanied by an increase in problem behaviors. Some 2e students withdraw, showing reluctance to speak out or take other risks in class; while others play the class clown. Some are unable to stay focused, find it hard to sit still and work quietly, and have difficulty controlling anger or frustration.

If these difficulties persist, school personnel or parents may decide that evaluation is needed. Along with a physical examination, children may undergo psycho-educational testing to determine the cause of their struggles. The professionals who take part in the process should be knowledgeable about giftedness. Some characteristics of giftedness can look very much like those of a learning disability or disorder and, as a result, gifted children are sometimes incorrectly diagnosed with disorders. For instance, if a single IQ score is considered in the identification of giftedness, 2e individuals with learning disabilities are likely to be misidentified. Therefore, evaluation results should indicate the child's areas of strength and weakness and identify whether any disorders or learning disabilities are present. In addition, the results should include information on what the child needs in order to build on the strengths and compensate for the weaknesses that have been identified. Teaching to students' abilities rather than disabilities increases self-concept scores.

== Support ==
Twice-exceptional (2e) children possess both giftedness and learning disabilities, requiring specialized support to thrive academically and socially. Their strengths are crucial for success, and they excel in environments that offer intellectual challenges and complex thinking opportunities. Essential support mechanisms include encouragement, compensation strategies, and accommodations such as time allowances. Effective interventions must address their intellectual and social-emotional needs, ensuring their gifts are recognized. At the same time, challenges they may encounter in their environment can be mitigated through self-advocacy skills and utilization of social and legal protections. Moreover, distinctions should be made to address the unique challenges that different diagnoses may present in individuals, particularly those with autism spectrum disorder (ASD) and attention deficit hyperactivity disorder (ADHD).

While both gifted individuals who are also identified as ASD or ADHD may exhibit high intelligence and unique interests, a key difference lies in their social interaction patterns. Some autistic individuals have unique profiles that may challenge reciprocal communication and understanding social cues and pacing, which can dramatically impact their learning opportunities. Alternatively, those with ADHD may require support with interest-based engagement and impulsiveness, which can influence their needs for organization support and time allowances, as well as opportunities to seek novelty.

Given these complexities, counselors and psychologists play vital roles in supporting 2e students. Counselors are positioned to be valuable resources for teachers, other school personnel, and community members who might need to become more familiar with twice-exceptionality. Psychologists provide and interpret assessments and develop targeted interventions based on students' cognitive profiles. Both professionals are essential in creating supportive educational environments that recognize and nurture the unique abilities of twice-exceptional students. Counselors, psychologists, and educators must adjust their approaches based on the 2e students' developmental levels to help ensure that environmental factors comply with and appropriately accommodate for these needs to ensure accelerative opportunities and talent development commensurate with individuals' talents, skills, and creative gifts.

== Education ==
The twice-exceptional education movement started in the early 1970s with "gifted-handicapped" education, a term essentially referring to the same population. The 2e education approach has 35 years of research and best practices tailored to the needs of 2e students. It is a marriage between special education and gifted education—a strengths-based, differentiated approach that provides special educational supports. Many argue that talent development is the most critical aspect of their education.

When teaching, there are methods an educator should avoid. Students do not respond well to lectures and gravitate toward "big picture" learning. These students have a hard time following strict rules and should not be expected to conform to them. Instead, being flexible with them and focusing more on holistic, big-picture learning is recommended.

Still, finding schools that can meet the needs of twice exceptional children can be a challenge for many parents. Public and private schools with programs that combine the appropriate levels of challenge and support for these learners are in the minority. For this reason, a number of parents choose alternative educational options for their 2e children, including homeschooling and virtual schools.

Only a handful of schools in United States offer a curriculum specifically tailored to 2e children. Some public schools offer part-time programs for twice exceptional students, where they can progress in subjects like math at their own pace, and meet other students like themselves.

== Criticism ==
The term "twice exceptional" has been listed among terms to avoid using for neurodivergent people, possibly because it is a synonym of "special", itself identified as an ableist term.

== See also ==
- Exceptional education
- The Fox and the Stork
- The Ugly Duckling
- Double empathy problem
- Nerd
- Autism rights movement
- Asperger syndrome
- Dyslexia
- Nonverbal learning disorder
- Invisible disability
