= Tommy McHugh =

British artist and poet (1949–2012)

- Born: 1949
- Died: 19 September 2012 (aged 62–63)
- Known for: poetry, painting

Tommy McHugh (1949 – 19 September 2012) was a British artist and poet. In his early life, McHugh was a builder and was also involved in youth crimes. When he was 51, he suffered a stroke on both sides of his brain that resulted in two burst blood vessels. He was in a coma for a week and acquired savant syndrome.

== Injury ==
In January 2001, McHugh was said to have "attempted to defecate in a rush following a knock on the toilet door", during which process he’d strained to the point of having a severed artery in the frontal and temporal lobes of his brain, causing him to haemorrhage.

While relearning after his stroke, McHugh started to paint and write poetry relentlessly, pursuing creative work for many hours per day. He also experienced an identity crisis which was most likely the motivation for his artistic outputs.

In an attempt to figure out the cause of his sudden personality change, McHugh wrote to and worked with two neuroscientists: Alice Flaherty from Harvard Medical School and Mark Lythgoe from University College London. A paper has been published about their discoveries.

== Death ==
McHugh died on the 19th of September, 2012 from cancer. Before his death, McHugh said that his strokes "have given [him] 11 years of a magnificent adventure that nobody could have expected."
