= Hyperlexia =

Significantly advanced reading ability in children

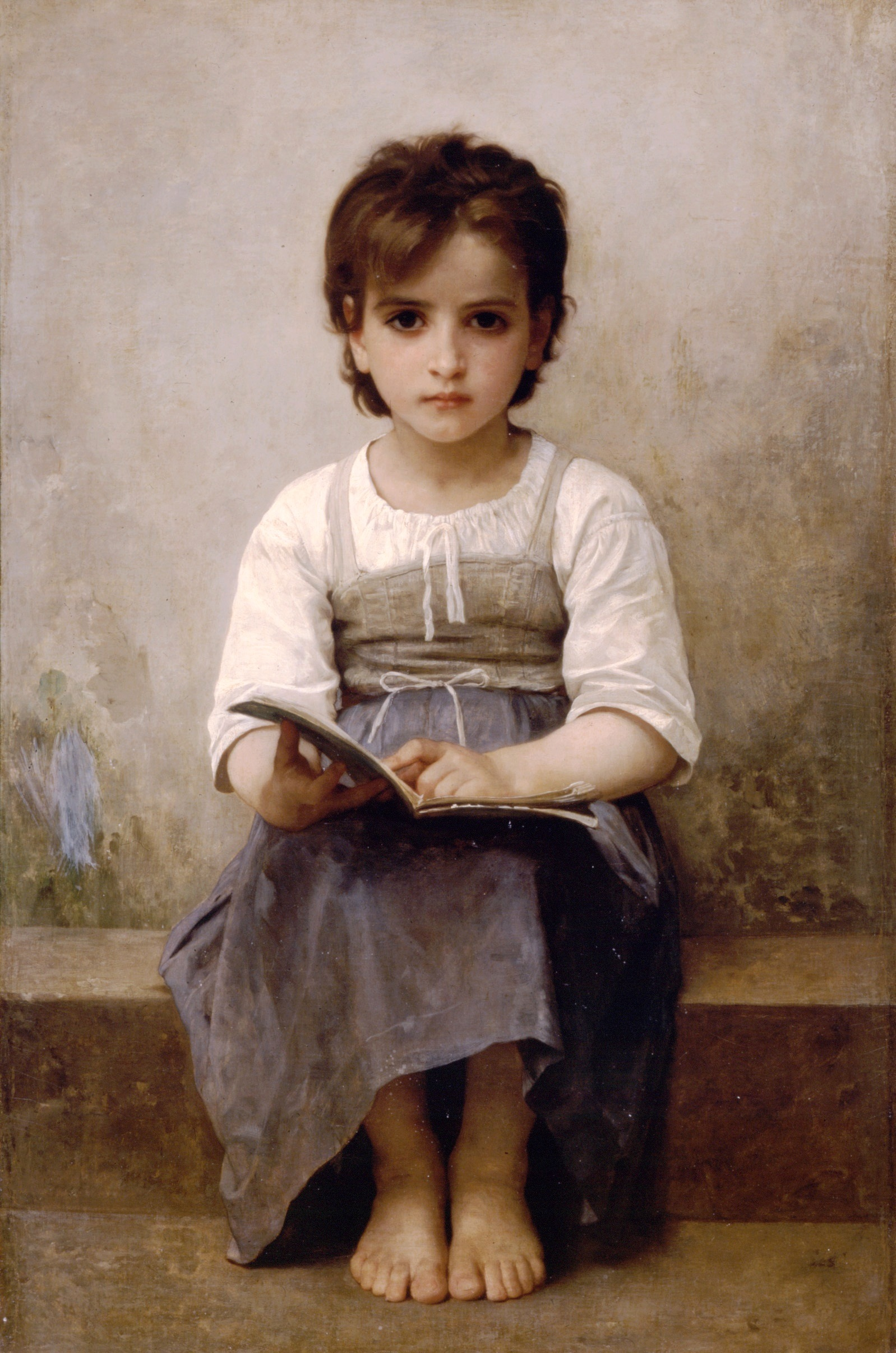
William-Adolphe Bouguereau, The Difficult Lesson (1884)

Hyperlexia is a syndrome characterized by a child's precocious ability to read. It was initially identified by Norman E. Silberberg and Margaret C. Silberberg (1967), who defined it as the precocious ability to read words without prior training in learning to read, typically before the age of five. They indicated that children with hyperlexia have a significantly higher word-decoding ability than their reading comprehension levels. Children with hyperlexia also present with an intense fascination for written material at a very early age.

Hyperlexic children are characterized by word-reading ability well above what would be expected given their age. First named and scientifically described in 1967, it can be viewed as an ability in which word recognition ability goes far above expected levels of skill. Some hyperlexics, however, have trouble understanding speech. Some experts believe that most children with hyperlexia, or perhaps even all of them, are autistic. However, one expert, Darold Treffert, proposes that hyperlexia has subtypes, only some of which overlap with autism. Between five and twenty percent of autistic children have been estimated to be hyperlexic.

Hyperlexic children are often fascinated by letters or numbers. They are extremely good at decoding language and thus often become very early readers. Some English-speaking hyperlexic children learn to spell long words (such as elephant) before they are two years old and learn to read whole sentences before they turn three.

== Etymology ==
The word hyperlexia is derived from the Greek terms hyper 'over, beyond, overmuch, above measure' and lexis 'word'.

== Development ==
Although hyperlexic children usually learn to read in a non-communicative way, several studies have shown that they can acquire reading comprehension and communicative language after the onset of hyperlexia. They follow a different developmental trajectory relative to neurotypical individuals, with milestones being acquired in a different order. Despite hyperlexic children's precocious reading ability, they may struggle to communicate. Often, hyperlexic children will have a precocious ability to read but will learn to speak only by rote and heavy repetition, and may also have difficulty learning the rules of language from examples or from trial and error, which may result in social problems. Their language may develop using echolalia and/or palilalia, often repeating words and sentences. Often, the child has a large vocabulary and can identify many objects and pictures, but cannot put their language skills to good use. Spontaneous language is lacking and their pragmatic speech is delayed. Hyperlexic children often struggle with Who? What? Where? Why? and How? questions. Between the ages of four and five years old, many children make great strides in communicating.

A 2018 review stated that "despite good decoding and verbal short-term memory skills, individuals with hyperlexia exhibit poor listening, verbal working memory, and reading comprehension skills."

== Types of hyperlexia ==
In one paper, Darold Treffert proposes three types of hyperlexia. Specifically:

- Type 1: Neurotypical children who are very early readers.
- Type 2: Autistic children who demonstrate very early reading as a splinter skill.
- Type 3: Very early readers who are not autistic, though they exhibit some "autistic-like" traits and behaviours which gradually fade as the child gets older.

A different paper by Rebecca Williamson Brown, OD proposes only two types of hyperlexia. These are:

- Type 1: Hyperlexia marked by an accompanying language disorder.
- Type 2: Hyperlexia marked by an accompanying visual-spatial learning disorder.

== Non-English studies ==
In studies in Cantonese and Korean, subjects were able to read non-words in their native orthography without a delay relative to the speed with which they read real words in their native orthography. There is a delay noted with exception words in English, including the examples chaos, unique, and enough. These studies also illustrate difficulties in understanding what it is that they are reading. The findings suggest that non-hyperlexic readers rely more heavily on word semantics in order to make inferences about word meaning.

The Cantonese study distinguish homographs and determine the readings for rarely used characters. In this study, the subject also made errors of phonetic analogy and regularization of sound. The authors of the study suggest that the two-routes model for reading Chinese characters may be in effect for hyperlexics. The two-routes model describes understanding of Chinese characters in a purely phonetic sense and the understanding of Chinese characters in a semantic sense.

The semantics deficit is also illustrated in the study of Korean hyperlexics through a priming experiment. Non-hyperlexic children read words primed with a related image faster than non-primed words while hyperlexics read them at the same pace. Lee Sunghee and Hwang Mina, the authors of the Korean study, also found that hyperlexics have fewer errors in non-word reading than non-hyperlexics. They suggest that this may be because of an imbalance in the phonological, orthographical, and semantic understandings of the subjects' native language and writing system, in this case, Hangul. This combination of the parts of linguistics is known as connectionism, in which non-words are distinguished from words by differences in interaction between phonology, orthography, and semantics.

In the Lee and Hwang study, the subjects scored lower on general language test and vocabulary tests than the average for their age groups. Literacy education in South Korea involves teaching students entire words, rather than starting with the relationship between phonemes and letters in Hangul, despite evidence that letter name knowledge is useful for learning to read words that have not been taught. The results suggest that hyperlexics are able to obtain the relations between letters (or the smallest unit of the writing system) and their phonemes without knowing the names.

Comprehension difficulties can also be a result of hyperlexia. Semantics and comprehension both have ties to meaning. Semantics relates to the meaning of a certain word while comprehension is the understanding of a longer text. In both studies, interpretation-based and meaning-based tests proved difficult for the hyperlexic subjects. In the Weeks study, the subject was unable to identify characters based on the logographic aspect of the writing system, and in the Lee and Hwang study, priming was ineffective in decreasing reading times for hyperlexics.
