= Patrick Fagerberg =

Artist, inventor and former lawyer considered a case of acquired savant

- Born: Richard Patrick Fagerberg; Cuernavaca, Mexico
- Occupations: Artist, inventor
- Website: patrickfagerberg.com

Richard Patrick Fagerberg is an artist, inventor and former lawyer, who is considered a rare case of acquired savant, a person who developed extraordinary abilities due to a brain injury.

On the evening of March 19, 2011, while attending an Orchestral Manoeuvres in the Dark (OMD) concert at the South by Southwest festival, a 400-pound (180 kg) camera boom collapsed and struck his head, causing a traumatic brain injury (TBI), resulting in memory loss and language processing problems.

Following the accident, in an art therapy class, Fagerberg discovered a talent for painting. Three years after getting started, he opened his first exhibit in Houston. He has been represented by Gremillion & Co. Fine Art since then.

Fagerberg is also the founder of RodaSurf, a new startup located in Austin, Texas. The company's first invention The RodaSurf, uses an atypical wheel placement on an electric skateboard to mimic the feeling of surfing on land.

== Early life ==
His father, Albert P Fagerberg, was an American independent film producer and writer who also goes by the pen name "Albert Pennell". In his autobiographical work, Where Do We Go From Here?, published in 2005, Albert Pennell revealed he was the ghostwriter of Stand Up For America, the autobiography of the American politician George Wallace, published in 1976 by Doubleday & Company:

When I had finished the ghostwriting of Governor George C. Wallace's, little publicized autobiography, Stand Up for America, […] I found myself broke and stranded in Montgomery Alabama, with my wife and our eight children. (Pennell, 2005)

== 2011 accident ==
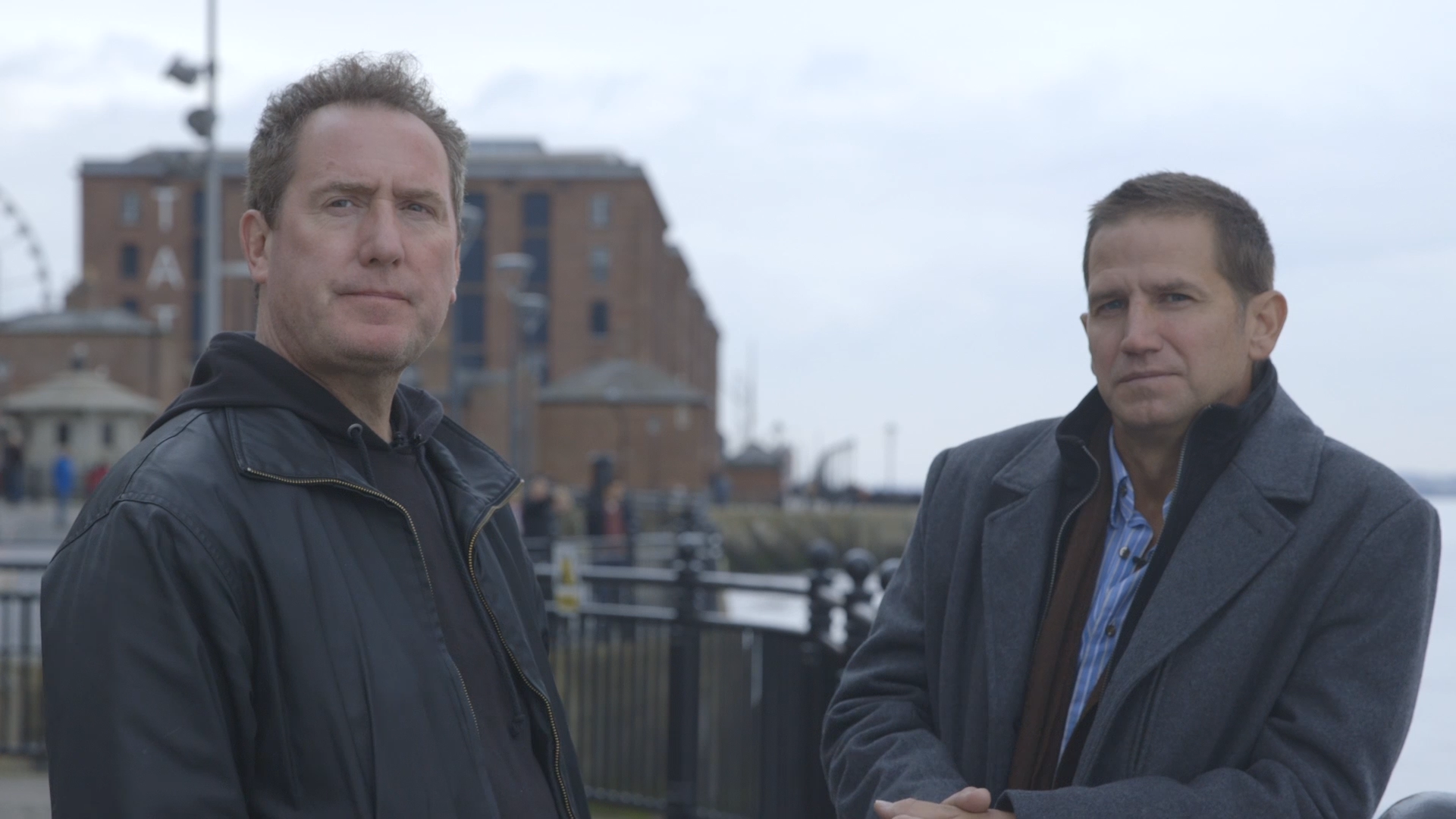
Artist Patrick Fagerberg and OMD lead singer Andy McCluskey, meet in Liverpool years after accident

On March 19, 2011, Fagerberg attended a show of the band OMD at the music festival South by Southwest (SXSW). A few seconds after the concert started, a 400-pound camera boom fell on the audience, injuring Fagerberg directly on the head, knocking him out for a few minutes. After being rushed to the hospital and running several tests and CT scans, Fagerberg was sent home that same night, as medics assured his neck was not broken and he had no obvious fractures on his skull.

However, two days later, Fagerberg started having trouble with putting sentences together and reading. The following days, he began showing symptoms like "raccoon eyes" or periorbital ecchymosis, and bleeding from ears. This led to the discovery of a basilar skull fracture and he was soon diagnosed with a traumatic brain injury (TBI). Fagerberg spent the next year and a half attending physical therapy, cognitive therapy, and speech therapy.

In 2011, Fagerberg sued Steve Madden, who had hired the videographer whose camera boom landed on Fagerberg's head. Fagerberg filed suit for negligence under the theories of respondent superior and ostensible authority, negligent hiring, and negligent supervision. He also sued the festival South by Southwest and the Stubb's BBQ music venue.

== Savant syndrome and art career ==
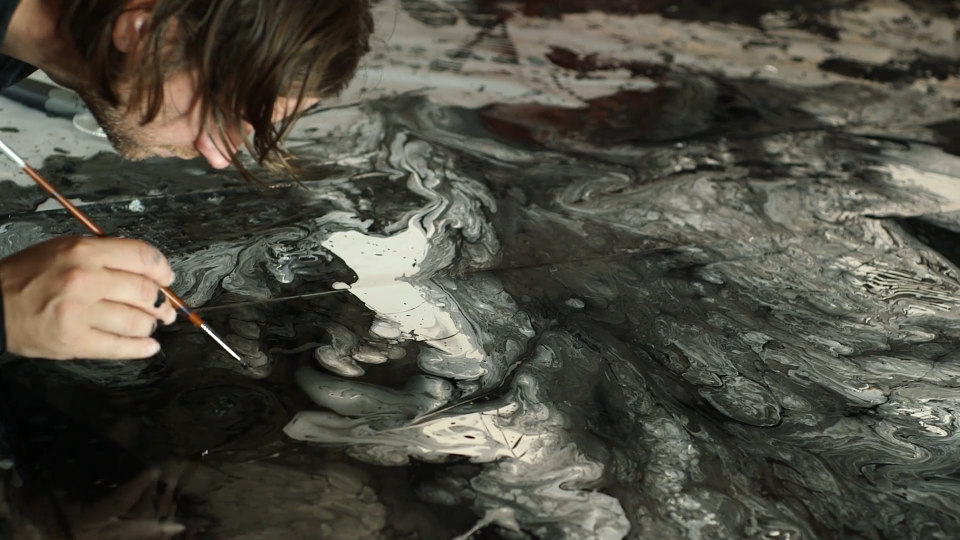
Patrick Fagerberg painting

During one of his cognitive therapy sessions, a suggestion that Fagerberg do art therapy was made. While taking these classes, Fagerberg developed a sudden urge to paint, even though he had never painted before. In an interview for People magazine, Fagerberg described this experience to writer Alex Heigl as a "little trigger going off", as it led him to start compulsively painting 20 hours a day.

Fagerberg took Vincent van Gogh's art and Edvard Munch's painting The Scream as main inspiration. He studied these artists' artworks hundreds of times before getting started with his own paintings.

A year and a half into painting and with 300 artworks under his name, he was introduced to Ronald Gremillion, art critic and owner of the Gremillion & Co. Fine Art gallery in Houston, Texas who decided to take Fagerberg on as an artist.

Since the beginning of his art career, Fagerberg has been referred to as a rare case of Savant syndrome, in which people acquire savant-like skills in art, music and/or mathematics due to a brain injury. Fagerberg's savant case is featured in the book The Savant Syndrome. Intellectual Impairment, Astonishing Condition by Dr. Osvaldo Cairó Battistutti (ASIN B08XR2DH3K), as one of the 60 known cases of this rare condition.

Fagerberg's artwork has been described as in living the realm of the sublime. Although abstract, it's been said that his paintings seem to represent large scale, cosmical events. Dr Tacey A. Rosolowski, a PhD in Comparative literature and art critic, has said about Fagerberg's art:

like Expressionist predecessors such as Still and Mark Rothko, Fagerberg approaches abstraction as an act of representing fundamental natural processes and moments of becoming.

Artist Jeannine Cook has also talked about the positive effect that art had in the recovery process of Fagerberg. She wrote an extensive blog post about it, where she says:

I think that artists (and those who become artists as the result of some traumatic experience) are incredibly lucky that they have a way to face and deal with the twists and turns of life that can be so devastating.

== Inventor ==
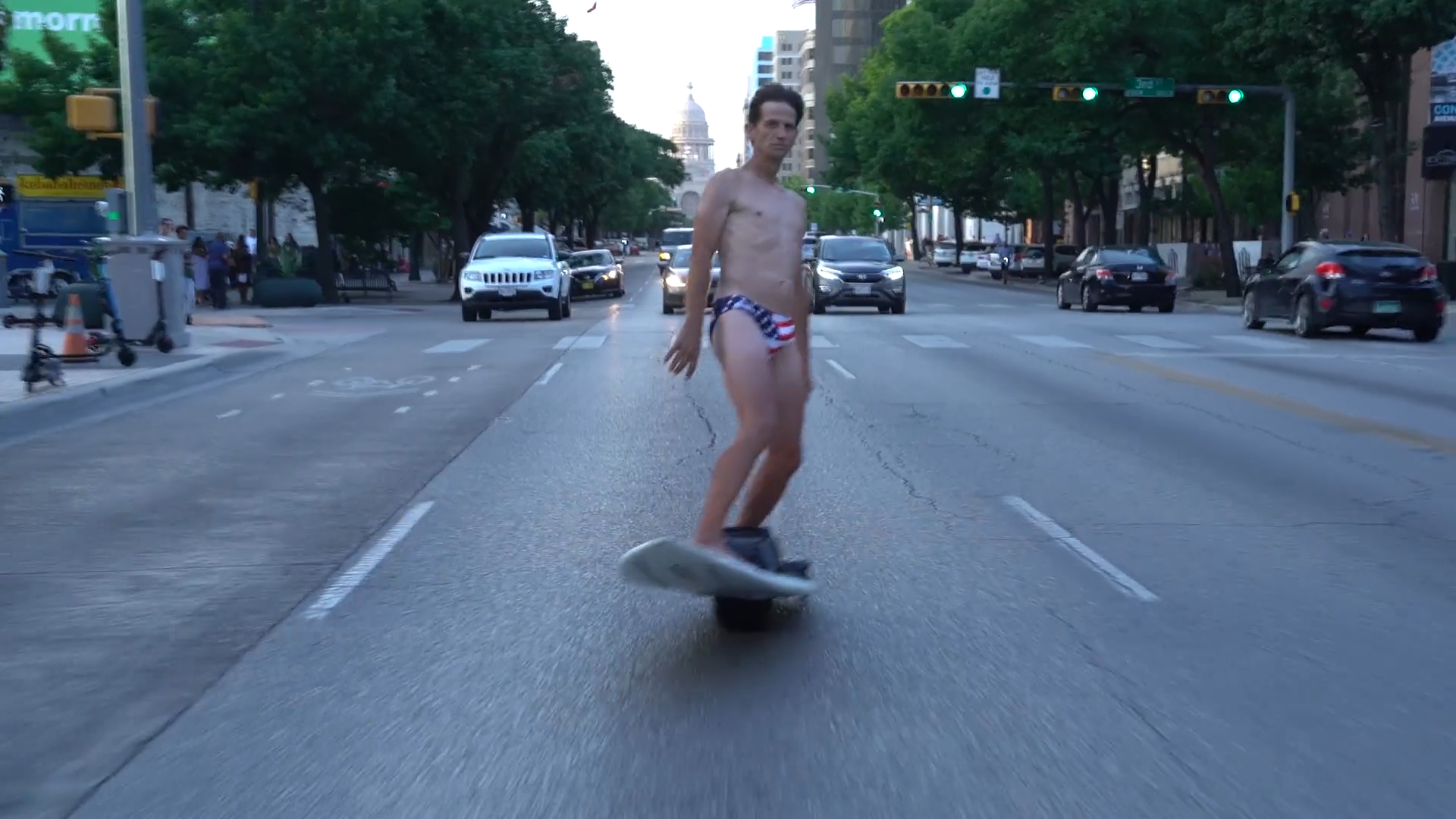
Patrick Fagerberg on The RodaSurf

Fagerberg holds a patent for the first electric vehicle to ever use an asymmetrical wheel placement. He decided to name his creation "The RodaSurf". RodaSurf's co-founder Starr Long, world renowned game developer, called this invention the "electric surfboards for the land".

By taking a one-wheel and creating a snap and lock system onto a surfboard, they created, in 2020, a surfboard that can be ridden on the streets. The RodaSurf board is an accessory to the Onewheel XR electric skateboard.

Fagerberg's street-surfing has been the subject of several press articles in Austin, Texas. He also appeared as a streetsurfer in the music video of the Austin-based hip-hop artist Reggie Lou, for his song Pinocchio.

== Issues with the law ==
Struggling with his traumatic brain injury, Fagerberg developed a severe cocaine addiction, which was fueled by the proceeds of his lawsuit settlement. His high levels of cocaine consumption would eventually lead him to be wrongly accused of being part of a distribution operation. Fagerberg was arrested in 2014. It was later proven he had no connection with the distribution of said substances.

In 2018, Fagerberg was once again in the news, after getting into a dispute with a man who was speeding 90 miles an hour down his neighborhood's street and almost killed his child. Fagerberg admitted to chasing him through the neighborhood after the incident in his own vehicle, coming to his window, punching him in the face and damaging the driver's vehicle.
