= Megan Wawro =

American mathematician

Megan Jean Wawro is an American mathematician and scholar of mathematics education who works as a professor of mathematics at Virginia Tech. Her research focuses on linear algebra in undergraduate education including both inquiry-based learning for linear algebra and the applications of linear algebra in teaching and understanding quantum mechanics.

== Education and career ==
Wawro majored in mathematics at Cedarville University, a Baptist school in Cedarville, Ohio; she graduated in 2000. After working as a secondary school art and mathematics teacher in Ohio and Switzerland, she continued her studies at Miami University of Ohio, where she received a master's degree in mathematics in 2005. She completed a Ph.D. in mathematics and science education in 2011 through a joint program of the University of California, San Diego and San Diego State University. Her doctoral dissertation, Individual and Collective Analyses of the Genesis of Student Reasoning Regarding the Invertible Matrix Theorem in Linear Algebra, was supervised by Chris Larson Rasmussen.

She joined Virginia Tech as an assistant professor of mathematics in 2011, was promoted to associate professor in 2016, and was promoted again to full professor in 2023.

== Recognition ==
Wawro is a 2016 recipient of the Presidential Early Career Award for Scientists and Engineers, given "for her outstanding research on students' learning and understanding of key concepts from upper-level undergraduate mathematics, and especially for leveraging pedagogical implications and synergy between mathematics and physics education research on STEM teaching and learning".
