= Splinter skill =

Ability to do a specific task that does not generalize to other tasks

A splinter skill is an "ability to do a specific task that does not generalize to other tasks", according to Occupational Therapy for Physical Dysfunction. Cheatum and Hammond define them as skills learned that are above the child's age. Jacks writes that they are skills that are not "an integral part of the orderly sequential development"; that is, skills mastered before they are developmentally expected.

According to Ayres and Robbins, an example is "the ability to play a particular piece on the piano without having the generalized ability to play the piano".

== Autism ==
Splinter skills are frequently seen in autistic individuals, and fell under the umbrella of savant skills in the older literature. If nurtured, they can result in profound artistic abilities. The most common splinter skill seen in autism is calendar calculation. Other areas where splinter skills are seen include working memory, music, art, or mathematics. Musically inclined splinter skills could be considered as an individual’s ability to play an instrument and understand the music composition without training. Artistic splinter skills can be seen as the individual’s advanced ability to create artwork that surpasses their developmental level. Mathematical splinter skills can be seen as the individual's profound interest in numbers and their advanced ability to solve complex problems that are not common for their development level. In some cases, these skills are based on the individual's hyperfocus on certain interests.

According to Neurolaunch's editorial team of professional clinical psychologists, there are two relevant theories to help explain the development of splinter skills in individuals with autism, such as the Weak Coherence Theory and the Perceptual Functioning Model.
