= Savant syndrome =

Psychological phenomenon

- Other names: Autistic savant, savant syndrome (historical)
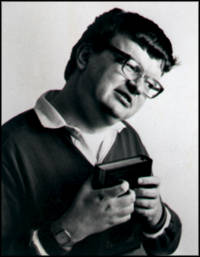
- Kim Peek, the savant who was the inspiration for the main character in the movie Rain Man
- Specialty: Psychiatry, neurology
- Symptoms: General intellectual disability with certain abilities far in excess of average
- Types: Congenital, acquired
- Causes: Neurodevelopmental disorder such as autism spectrum disorder, brain injury
- Frequency: ~1 in a million people

Savant syndrome (/ˈsæ.vənt, sæ.ˈvɑːnt/ SAV-ənt, sa-VAHNT, US also /sə.ˈvɑːnt/ sə-VAHNT) is a phenomenon where someone demonstrates exceptional aptitude in one domain, such as art or mathematics, but with some form of social or intellectual impairment.

Those with savant syndrome generally have a neurodevelopmental condition, such as autism, or have experienced a brain injury. About half of cases are associated with autism, and these individuals may be known as autistic savants. The other half often have some form of central nervous system injury or disease. While the condition usually becomes apparent in childhood, some cases develop later in life. Savant syndrome itself is not recognized as a mental disorder within the Diagnostic and Statistical Manual of Mental Disorders, Fifth Edition (DSM-5), as it relates to parts of the brain healing or restructuring.

Savant syndrome affects around one in a million people. Six times more men are diagnosed with the condition than women. The first medical account of the condition was in 1783. Between 0.5% and 10% of those with autism have some form of savant abilities. Fewer than one hundred currently living savants have skills so extraordinary that they would be considered spectacular even among unimpaired individuals.

== Signs and symptoms ==
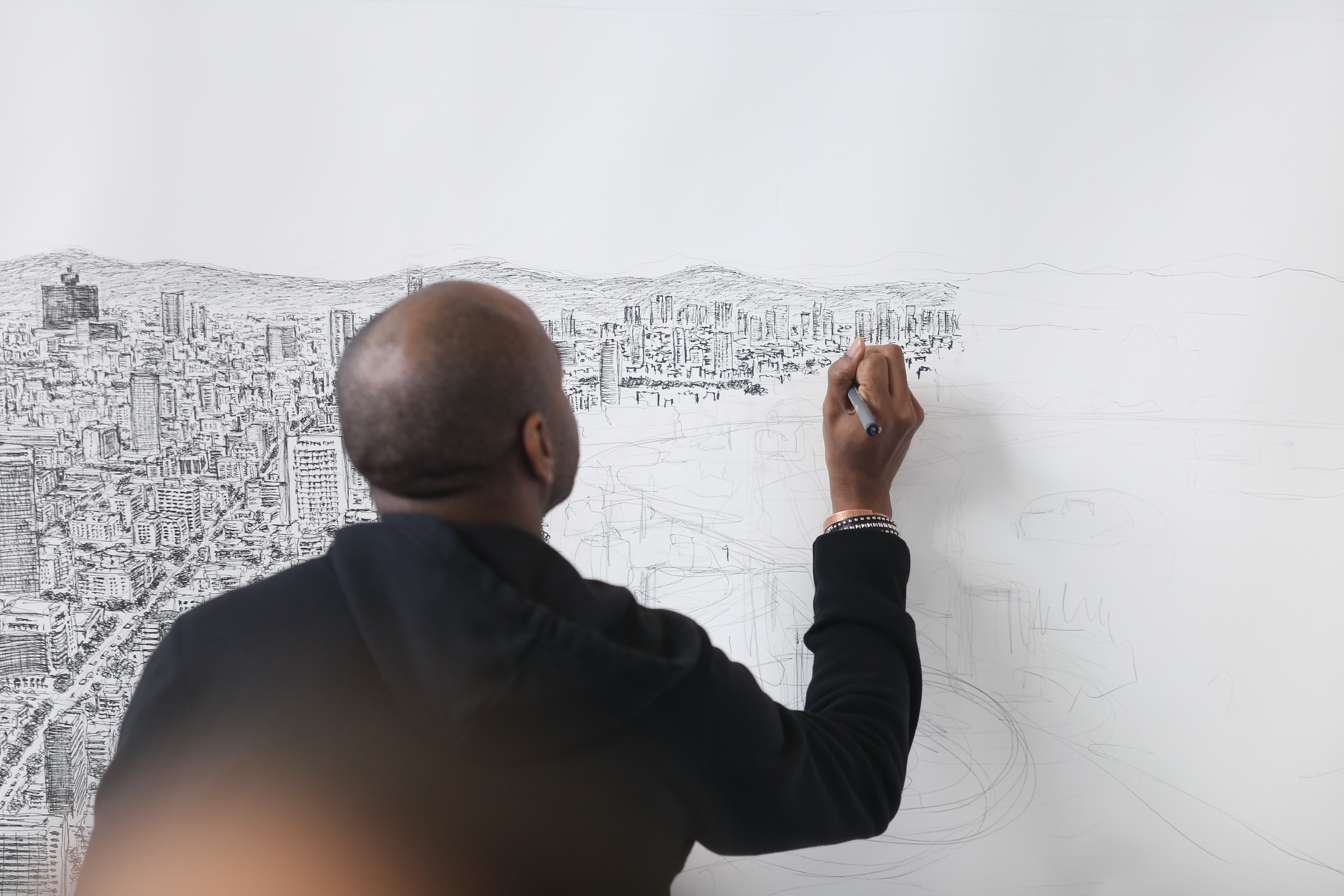
British artistic savant Stephen Wiltshire drawing Mexico City

Savant skills are usually found in one or more of five major areas: art, memory, arithmetic, musical abilities, and spatial skills. The most common kinds of savants are calendrical savants, "human calendars" who can calculate the day of the week for any given date with speed and accuracy, or recall personal memories from any given date. Advanced memory is the key "superpower" in savant abilities.

=== Musical savants ===
A musical savant is someone who displays genius musical abilities such as perfect pitch, instant composition, or fluency in multiple instruments, all with no prior experience. Savants commonly share a unique triad of characteristics, those being blindness, mental disability, and musical genius. While this trio of characteristics appears frequently in reports on savants, the cause remains unidentified.

=== Calendrical savants ===
A calendrical savant (or calendar savant) is someone who – despite having an intellectual disability – can name the day of the week of a date, or vice versa, on a limited range of decades or certain millennia. The rarity of human calendar calculators is possibly due to the lack of motivation to develop such skills among the general population, although mathematicians have developed algorithms that allow them to obtain similar skills. Calendrical savants, on the other hand, may not be prone to invest in socially engaging skills.

== Mechanism ==
=== Psychological ===
No widely accepted cognitive theory explains savants' combination of talent and deficit. It has been suggested that individuals with autism are biased towards detail-focused processing and that this cognitive style predisposes individuals either with or without autism to savant talents.

Another hypothesis is that savants hyper-systemize, thereby giving an impression of talent. Hyper-systemizing is an extreme state in the empathising–systemising theory that classifies people based on their skills in empathizing with others versus systemizing facts about the external world. Also, the attention to detail of savants is a consequence of enhanced perception or sensory hypersensitivity in these unique individuals. It has also been hypothesized that some savants operate by directly accessing deep, unfiltered information that exists in all human brains that is not normally available to conscious awareness.

Further researchers have proposed the autism-linked trait of obsessiveness as a contributing factor to savant syndrome. In other words, some savants may over-rehearse their skills due to obsessive special-interest. A 2012 study showed that savant children are likely to score higher on a 'obsessions and special interest' metric than their autistic-nonsavant counterparts.

=== Neurological ===
In some cases, savant syndrome can be induced following severe head trauma to the left anterior temporal lobe. Savant syndrome has been artificially replicated using low-frequency transcranial magnetic stimulation to temporarily disable this area of the brain. Other cases includes neurodivergent people who developed savant syndrome after experiencing certain diseases. One example being otherwise healthy elderly persons with frontotemporal dementia who develop savant syndrome later in life.

== Epidemiology ==
There are no objectively definitive statistics about how many people have savant skills. The estimates range from "exceedingly rare" to one in ten people with autism having savant skills in varying degrees. A 2009 British study of 137 parents of autistic children found that 28% believe their children met the criteria for a savant skill, defined as a skill or power "at a level that would be unusual even for 'normal' people'". As many as 50 cases of sudden or acquired savant syndrome have been reported.

The sex ratio disparity is slightly higher than for autism spectrum disorders of 4.3:1, with males with savant syndrome outnumbering females with savant syndrome by an approximately 6:1 ratio.

== Treatment ==
As of November 2025, there are no established formal guidelines for the assessment and treatment of distress or psychological symptoms associated with savant syndrome, nor for the management or refinement of exceptional skills. Regarding interventions, existing reviews provide no specific indications tailored directly to savant syndrome as a distinct category. However, several approaches are applied to address associated conditions and psychological distress:

- Cognitive-behavioral therapy (CBT) has shown the most convincing results in supporting individuals with high-functioning autism (ASD Level 1) by reducing common symptoms like anxiety and depression and helping manage daily tasks.
- Psychological and vocational support programs developed for gifted individuals are increasingly widespread and may offer relevant resources for supporting people with exceptional skills.
- Preliminary evidence from a recent case series exploring evolutionary systems therapy indicates potential feasibility in reducing psychosocial distress among autistic individuals with savant syndrome by targeting poor self-reflectivity and poor self-soothing.

== History ==
The term idiot savant (French for 'learned idiot') was first used to describe the condition in 1887 by John Langdon Down, who is known for his description of Down syndrome. Down described approximately ten cases of youth he had known with unusual mental powers, like "verbal adhesion" (e.g. memorizing books read once), photographic memory for artistic drawing, model-building, or music, autobiographical memory, arithmetic & calendrical calculation, and always knowing the current time down to the minute. Down noted that they were all male, none had a family history of similar talents, and that the extraordinary memory was usually associated with "very great defect of reasoning power".

The term idiot savant was later described as a misnomer because not all reported cases fit the definition of idiot, originally used for a person with a very severe intellectual disability. The term autistic savant was also used as a description of the disorder. Like idiot savant, the term came to be considered a misnomer because only half of those who were diagnosed with savant syndrome were autistic. Upon realization of the need for accuracy of diagnosis and dignity towards the individual, the term savant syndrome became widely accepted terminology.

== Society and culture ==
=== Notable individuals ===
- Nadia Chomyn, British autistic artist
- Jodi DiPiazza, American musician
- Temple Grandin, American professor of animal science
- Seth F. Henriett, Hungarian autistic writer and artist
- Kodi Lee, 2019 America's Got Talent winner (musician)
- Leslie Lemke, American musician
- Rex Lewis-Clack, American pianist and musical savant
- Derek Paravicini, British blind musical prodigy and pianist
- Kim Peek, American "megasavant"
- Matt Savage, American musician
- Daniel Tammet, British author and polyglot
- Richard Wawro, British crayon artist
- Blind Tom Wiggins, American blind pianist and composer
- Stephen Wiltshire, British architectural artist

==== Acquired cases ====
- Derek Amato, American acquired savant composer and pianist
- Alonzo Clemons, American acquired savant sculptor
- Tony Cicoria, American acquired savant pianist and medical doctor
- Patrick Fagerberg, American acquired savant artist, inventor and former lawyer
- Tommy McHugh, British artist and poet
- Orlando Serrell, American acquired savant

=== Fictional characters ===
- Raymond Babbitt, autistic savant in the 1988 American film Rain Man (inspired by Kim Peek)
- Maria Bagtikan-Cruz, acquired savant in a 2011 episode of the Philippine television sitcom series Pepito Manaloto
- Ireneo Funes, acquired savant in the 1942 short story Funes the Memorious by Argentine writer Jorge Luis Borges
- Forrest Gump, savant in the 1986 American novel Forrest Gump by Winston Groom and the 1994 film
- Kazan, developmentally disabled savant in the 1997 Canadian film Cube
- Shaun Murphy, autistic savant in the 2017 American medical drama television series The Good Doctor (remake of the 2013 South Korean series)
- Patrick Obyedkov, acquired savant in a 2007 episode of the American medical drama House
- Park Shi-on, autistic savant in the 2013 South Korean medical drama Good Doctor
- Christian Wolff, autistic savant in the 2016 American film The Accountant and its 2025 sequel The Accountant 2
- Woo Young-woo, autistic savant in the 2022 South Korean television series Extraordinary Attorney Woo
- Chauncey Gardiner, presumed savant in the 1979 American film Being There

== See also ==
- Autistic art
- Child prodigy
- Creativity and mental health
- Mental calculator
- Hyperthymesia
- Ideasthesia
- Twice exceptional
