= Special interest (autism) =

Highly focused interests in autistic people

Autistic art depicting a special interest in cats

Special interests are highly focused interests common in autistic people. They are more intense than typical interests, such as hobbies, and may take up much of a person's free time. A person with a special interest will often hyperfocus on their special interest for hours, want to learn as much as possible on the topic, collect related items, and incorporate their special interest into play and art. Some interests are more likely to be seen as special interests if they are particularly unusual, specific, or niche; however, this binary of acceptable "passions" and pathologised "obsessions" has been criticized by autism-rights advocates and psychologists. Terms like circumscribed interests, obsessions, or restricted interests have historically been used to describe special interests; however, the use of these terms is discouraged by advocates.

Special interests are sometimes conflated with hyperfixations. Hyperfixations are typically short-lived periods of strong interest in a subject over a few days to months which are especially common in people with attention deficit hyperactivity disorder, while special interests are most common among autistic people and last for longer periods of time, typically years.

== Occurrence and development ==
Around 75–90% of autistic people develop a special interest, with some studies claiming as high as 95%. Special interests are often developed between one and four years of age but may not develop until adulthood. Many special interests start in autistic children as a fascination with a particular object, character, or work (e.g., Thomas the Tank Engine) and later develop into an interest in a specific topic (e.g., trains). A special interest may change over time or last a person's whole life. A 2014 survey found that the average number of special interests an autistic person has is two, and the average longevity is 13 years. A 2021 pilot study found the mean number of current special interests reported was nine.

Intense special interests were written about by French psychiatrist Jean-Étienne Dominique Esquirol in 1827. They were tied to a condition today considered autism by Soviet child psychiatrist Grunya Sukhareva in 1925. In November 1940, Lauretta Bender and Paul Schilder published a paper focused on the topic. Bender and Schilder's contemporaries like Hans Asperger and Leo Kanner also wrote about the matter, which was important to the development of autism awareness.

Special interests were later one of the traits listed when autism first appeared in the DSM-III in 1980. Special interests are listed as a diagnostic trait of autism in the current DSM-5-TR, described as "highly restricted, fixated interests that are abnormal in intensity or focus (e.g., strong attachment to or preoccupation with unusual objects, excessively circumscribed or perseverative interests)". The ICD-11 lists special interests as part of a broader category in its diagnostic criteria, described as "persistent preoccupation with one or more special interests, parts of objects, or specific types of stimuli (including media) or an unusually strong attachment to particular objects".

Common areas of special interests include transportation, animals, sports, music, fictional characters, sensory experiences, and popular culture. Special interests of autistic girls may be overlooked if the area is considered more "typical" or socially oriented, though a 2024 study found more similarities than differences in the characteristics of special interests in autistic boys and girls.

Autistic people with obsessive-compulsive disorder may experience intrusive thoughts or compulsive behaviors connected to their special interest. A participant in a 2024 study explained, "I think [OCD] is quite closely linked with autism because my special interest ... is medicine ... I really like to care for people. I would never want to do anybody harm. I want to be a good person if I can. So, I kind of wonder if the reason I have these obsessions is because I’m so concerned about that."

== Engagement ==
Engaging in special interests can bring autistic people great joy and intrinsic value, and many autistic people spend large amounts of time engaged in their special interest. In adults, engaging with special interests has been shown to have positive outcomes for mental health and self-esteem and can be used to manage stress.

Special interests can sometimes interfere with other areas of a person's life, such as school. In children, incorporating a child's special interest into their education has been shown to improve learning outcomes, increase attention on learning topics, and teach behaviours such as sportsmanship. Students have been shown to write better when writing about their special interest compared to a control topic. A 2022 study showed 25% of autistic people who worked had employment in their area of special interest and that adults with employable special interests may have better employment outcomes.

=== Social interaction ===
Encouraging discussion of a special interest can help autistic people develop social skills and help them find social communities. Autism acceptance proponents encourage autistic people to embrace their special interests, as long as they are not interfering with other parts of a person's life. Special interests can be used by autistic people as a way to understand the world and non-autistic people.

Special interests may lead to social difficulties if the person does not want to discuss any other topic, and conversations may become one-sided, especially when infodumping. Some special interests may be viewed as unusual, such as an interest in electricity pylons being seen as odder than an interest in horses or football teams. Other special interests may be seen as atypical for a person's age.

Autistic people who are aware of this may deliberately stop themselves from talking about their special interest as a form of masking, especially if they have been mocked for their interest in the past. Autistic adults are more likely to experience anxiety, depression, and stress if they have a history of being bullied for their special interest.

== Examples ==
Environmental activist Greta Thunberg has credited her success to her special interests. She explained to The Guardian in 2021, "A lot of people with autism have a special interest that they can sit and do for an eternity without getting bored. It's a very useful thing sometimes ... [if] you feel you have a purpose, then it can be something you can use for good, and I think I'm doing that now".

Scientist and autism advocate Temple Grandin exhibited intense compassion and interest in animals from a young age, and her strong connection with animals led to innovations in livestock care. She said in a 2013 Scientific American article, "My obsession with cattle chutes turned into a successful career designing cattle handling facilities. I tell parents and teachers to tap into child’s obsessions and special interests and use them to motivate."

Carl the Collector is an animated children's show starring an anthropomorphic raccoon child with a special interest in collecting items. Director Lisa Whittick was inspired by the experiences of her autistic son, sharing in a 2024 TV Kids interview, "A lot of autistic people do have special interests, and [my son] was always so excited to share whatever his special interest was ... Carl is the same, where he has all of these special collections and no matter what the situation, he can somehow relate it back to one of his collections and help move the story along.”
