= Darold Treffert =

American psychiatrist (1933–2020)

- Born: March 12, 1933; Fond du Lac, Wisconsin
- Died: December 14, 2020 (aged 87); Fond du Lac, Wisconsin
- Citizenship: American
- Education: Bethany Lutheran College (1953) University of Wisconsin Medical School (MD, 1958)
- Scientific career
- Fields: Savant syndrome, autism spectrum disorder, hyperlexia
- Workplaces: Treffert Center Agnesian HealthCare St. Agnes Hospital Fond du Lac County Health Care Center Marian University University of Wisconsin-Milwaukee University of Wisconsin Medical School Winnebago Mental Health
- Website: www.treffertcenter.com www.savantsyndrome.com

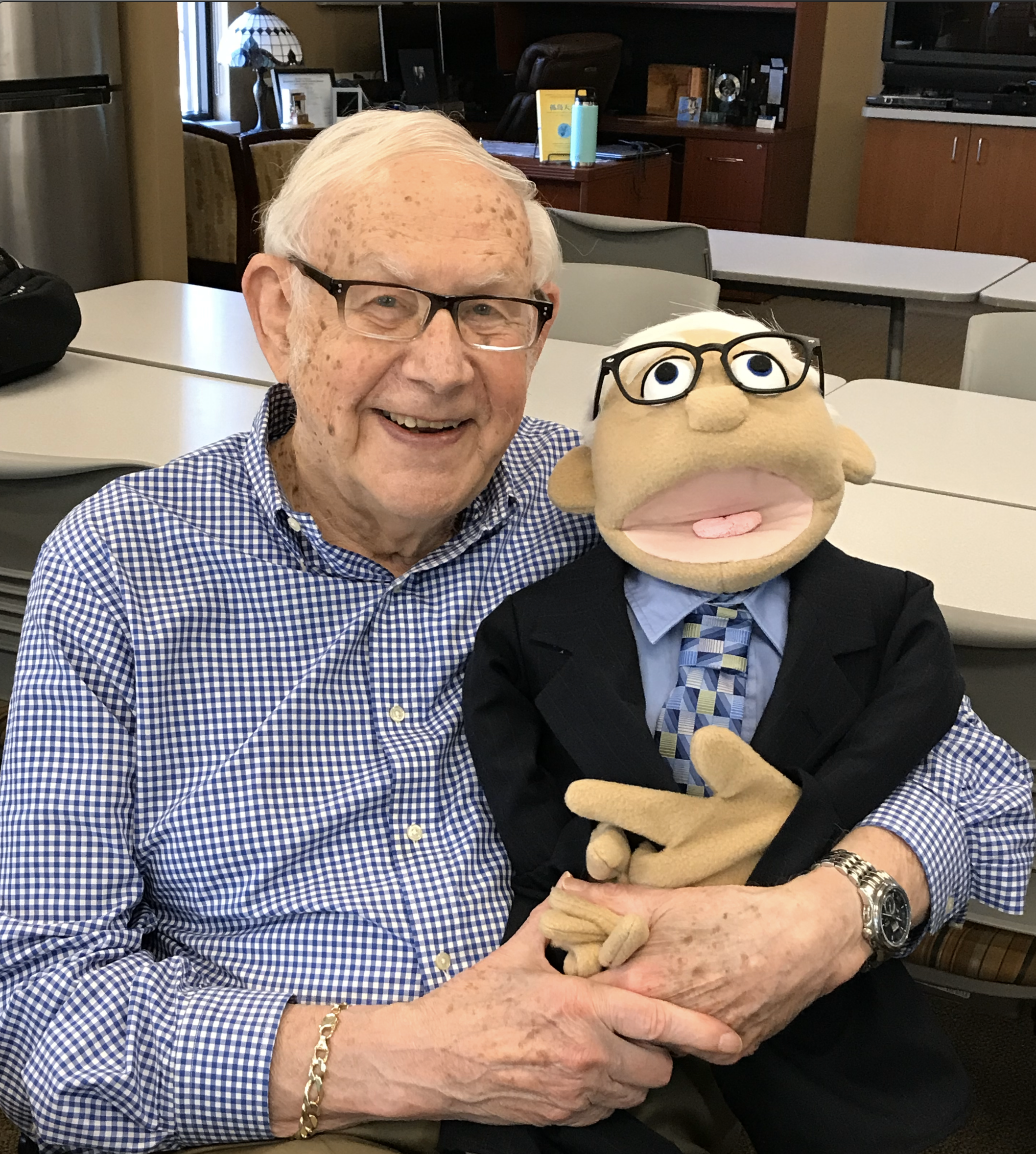
Dr. Darold Treffert poses at the Treffert Center in Fond du Lac, Wisconsin, holding a puppet created in his likeness by his colleagues, circa 2019

Darold A. Treffert (March 12, 1933 – December 14, 2020) was an American psychiatrist and research director who specialized in the epidemiology of autism spectrum disorders and savant syndrome. He lived in Fond du Lac, Wisconsin. He was on the staff at Agnesian HealthCare and served on the Board of Trustees of Marian University. Treffert was a clinical professor at the University of Wisconsin Medical School. He was also a clinical professor at University of Wisconsin–Milwaukee.

== Education ==
Treffert first attended Bethany Lutheran College where he focused on pre-medical courses and earned an associate in arts degree in 1953. He received his medical doctorate in 1958 from the University of Wisconsin Medical School. He interned in Eugene, Oregon, and then completed a residency in psychiatry at University Hospitals (now University of Wisconsin Hospital and Clinics) in Madison, Wisconsin.

== Career ==
External videos
- Accidental Genius, Darold Treffert, 17:58, TEDx Fond du Lac

In 1962, he developed the child-adolescent unit at Winnebago Mental Health Institute and in 1964 was named superintendent. It was there he met his first savants, sparking an unquenchable curiosity that would last over 50 years. In 1979, he began dividing his time between the private practice of Psychiatry and a position as executive director of the Fond du Lac County Health Care Center. He was also medical director of the Alcoholism Rehabilitation Unit of St. Agnes Hospital. In 1991, he retired from those positions but continued to write, conduct research, and offer guidance and encouragement to families around the globe. From 1979 to 1980, Treffert was president of the State Medical Society of Wisconsin and from 1981 to 1987 was chair of its board of directors. He was also the president of the Wisconsin Psychiatric Association and the American Association of Psychiatric Administrators. In 1995, he was appointed to the Wisconsin Medical Examining Board and, in January 2002, was elected its chair.

Treffert maintained a website on autism, savant syndrome, and related conditions hosted by the Wisconsin Medical Society. He held a research director position at the Treffert Center, Agnesian HealthCare in Fond du Lac, Wisconsin.

His first book Extraordinary People, published in 1989, described savants throughout history, including Blind Tom, Leslie Lemke, Alonzo Clemens, and a woman named Ellen. Treffert especially examined the memory of savants. "Why is it that phenomenal memory is seen in all the savants, no matter what particular individual skill they exhibit?" he wrote. Later editions of the book included a section on the movie Rain Man and its inspiration, Kim Peek.

Treffert died unexpectedly at his home in Fond du Lac on December 14, 2020.

== Appearances ==
Treffert has made appearances on 60 Minutes, CBS Evening News, The Phil Donahue Show, Discovery Channel, Larry King Live, the Newshour, The Oprah Winfrey Show, Today, and in a number of documentaries.

== Publications ==
Treffert has written articles in Scientific American and MIND. His books include:

- Extraordinary People: Understanding Savant Syndrome, iUniverse.com, 2000. ISBN 0-595-09239-X
- Islands of Genius: The Bountiful Mind of the Autistic, Acquired, and Sudden Savant. Jessica Kingsley Publishers, 2010. ISBN 978-1-84905-810-0

== See also ==
- Historical figures sometimes considered autistic
