= Stephen Wiltshire =

British architectural artist (born 1974)

Stephen Wiltshire MBE
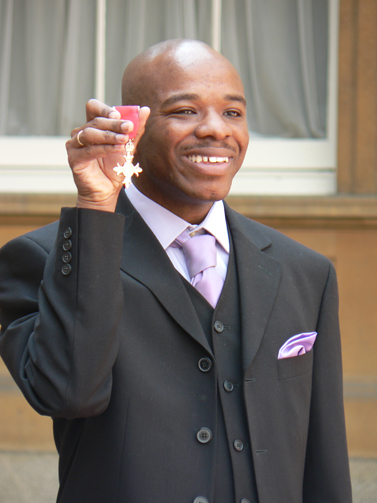
- Wiltshire receiving an MBE for services to art
- Born: 24 April 1974 (age 52); London, England
- Education: City and Guilds of London Art School
- Occupation: Artist

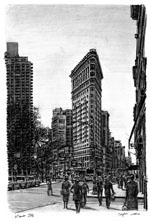
Flatiron Building New York (2006)

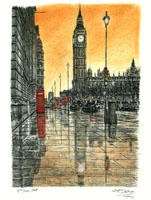
Big Ben on a rainy evening (2008)

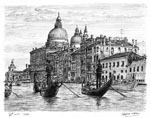
Venice (2008)

Stephen Wiltshire MBE, Hon.FSAI, Hon.FSSAA (born 24 April 1974) is a British architectural artist and autistic savant. He is known for his ability to draw a landscape from memory after seeing it just once. His work has gained worldwide fame.

In 2006, Wiltshire was made a Member of the Order of the British Empire (MBE) for services to art. In the same year, he opened a permanent gallery on the Royal Opera Arcade in London.

== Early life ==
Stephen Wiltshire was born in London in 1974 to Caribbean parents; his father, Colvin, was a native of Barbados, and his mother, Geneva, is a native of Saint Lucia. He grew up in Little Venice, Maida Vale, London. Wiltshire was non-verbal when young. At the age of three, he was diagnosed with autism. The same year, his father died in a motorbike accident.

At the age of five, Wiltshire was sent to Queensmill School in London where he expressed interest in drawing. His early illustrations depicted animals and cars; he is still extremely interested in American cars and is said to have an encyclopaedic knowledge of them. When he was about seven, Wiltshire became fascinated with sketching landmark London buildings. After being shown a book of photos depicting the devastation wrought by earthquakes, he began to create detailed architectural drawings of imaginary cityscapes.

In June 2015, the BBC's Lucy Ash reported: "Soon people outside the school started noticing Stephen's gift and aged eight he landed his first commission—a sketch of Salisbury Cathedral for the former Prime Minister Edward Heath". When he was ten, Wiltshire drew a sequence of drawings of London landmarks, one for each letter, that he called a "London Alphabet".

In 1987, Wiltshire was part of the BBC programme The Foolish Wise Ones. Drawings, a collection of his works, was published that same year.

Between 1995 and his graduation in 1998, Wiltshire attended the City and Guilds of London Art School in Kennington, Lambeth, South London.

== Career ==
Wiltshire can look at a subject once and then draw an accurate and detailed picture of it. He frequently draws entire cities from memory, based on single, brief helicopter rides. For example, he produced a detailed drawing of four square miles of London after a helicopter ride above that city. His nineteen-foot-long drawing of 305 square miles of New York City is based on a twenty-minute helicopter ride. He also draws fictional scenes, for example, St. Paul's Cathedral surrounded by flames.

Wiltshire's early books include Drawings (1987), Cities (1989), Floating Cities (1991), and Stephen Wiltshire's American Dream (1993). Floating Cities was number one on The Sunday Times best-seller list.

In 2003, a retrospective of his work, "Not a Camera: the Unique Vision of Stephen Wiltshire", was held in the Orleans House gallery in Twickenham, London.

In May 2005 Wiltshire produced his longest ever panoramic memory drawing of Tokyo on a 32.8-foot-long (10.0 m) canvas within seven days following a helicopter ride over the city. Since then he has drawn Rome, Hong Kong, Frankfurt, Madrid, Dubai, Jerusalem and London on giant canvasses. When Wiltshire took the helicopter ride over Rome, he drew it in such great detail that he drew the exact number of columns in the Pantheon.

In October 2009 Wiltshire completed the last work in the series of panoramas, an 18-foot (5.5 m) memory drawing of his "spiritual home", New York City. Following a 20-minute helicopter ride over the city he sketched the view of Manhattan, the Hudson shoreline of New Jersey, the Financial District, Ellis Island, the Statue of Liberty, and Brooklyn over five days at the Pratt Institute, a college of art and design in New York City. This piece is now located at the Empire State Building, on the 86th floor observation deck.

In 2010, he made a panorama of Sydney to raise funds for and awareness of Autism Spectrum Australia (Aspect). He visited Bermuda National Gallery where the sale of his donated drawing of Hamilton raised over $22,000. In June 2010, Christie's auctioned off his oil painting Times Square at Night.

Wiltshire started a tour of China in September 2010, with a first project taking him to Shanghai.

A 2011 project in New York City involved Wiltshire's creation of a panoramic memory drawing of New York which is now displayed on a 250-foot (76 m) long giant billboard at John F. Kennedy International Airport. It is a part of a global advertising campaign for the Swiss bank UBS that carries the theme "We will not rest", The New York Times reported. Also that year, he appeared on Top Gear.

In July 2014, Wiltshire drew an aerial panorama of the Singapore skyline from memory after a brief helicopter ride, taking five days to complete the 1m x 4m artwork. The artwork was presented to President Tony Tan as the Singapore Press Holding (SPH)'s gift to the nation in celebration of Singapore's 50th birthday in 2015, and is now displayed at Singapore City Gallery, visitor centre of the country's urban planning authority, Urban Redevelopment Authority.

Wiltshire's feature-length documentary titled Billions of Windows premiered in London on 13 November 2019.

== Recognition ==
Wiltshire's work has been the subject of many TV documentaries, like The Human Camera. Neurologist Oliver Sacks wrote about him in a chapter on prodigies in his book An Anthropologist on Mars.

In 1989, Wiltshire appeared on the cover of You magazine with actor Dustin Hoffman, who had portrayed autistic savant Raymond Babbitt in the 1988 Oscar-winning film, Rain Man, which Wiltshire considers to be one of his favourite films.

In 2006, Wiltshire was appointed a Member of the Order of the British Empire (MBE) for services to art. In September 2006 Wiltshire opened his permanent gallery in the Royal Opera Arcade, Pall Mall, London.

On 15 February 2008, ABC News named him Person of the Week.

In July 2009 he acted as ambassador of the Children's Art Day in the United Kingdom.

In 2011, Wiltshire was made an honorary Fellow of the Society of Architectural Illustrators (SAI). In January 2015, Wiltshire was also made an honorary Fellow of The Scottish Society of Architect Artists.
