= The Canadian Journal of Psychiatry =

- Discipline: Psychiatry
- Language: English, French
- Edited by: Scott Patten

Publication details
- Former name: Canadian Psychiatric Association Journal
- History: 1956–present
- Publisher: Canadian Psychiatric Association
- Frequency: Monthly
- Open access: Delayed, 6 month
- Impact factor: 4.356 (2020)

Standard abbreviations
- ISO 4: Can. J. Psychiatry

Indexing
- CODEN: CPAJAK
- ISSN: 0706-7437 (print); 1497-0015 (web)
- LCCN: 79644376
- OCLC no.: 04678455

Links
- Journal homepage; Archive of older papers

The Canadian Journal of Psychiatry/La revue canadienne de psychiatrie is a monthly peer-reviewed medical journal published originally by the Canadian Psychiatric Association. Since January 2015 it has been published by SAGE. It covers all aspects of psychiatry. Articles are published in English or French, with abstracts in both languages. The journal publishes original research papers, systematic reviews, book reviews, letters to the editor, and official position papers, position statements, policy papers, and clinical practice guidelines of the Canadian Psychiatric Association.

== History ==
The journal was established in January 1956 as The Canadian Psychiatric Association Journal/La revue de l'association canadienne de psychiatrie. The journal started as a quarterly publication, under its founding editor-in-chief, F. Rhodes Chalke. He was succeeded in 1972 by Frederick Lowy, who remained until 1976. Publication changed from bimonthly in 1974 to eight issues a year in 1975. Edward Kingstone took over as editor in 1977. The journal obtained its current name in 1979. He was succeeded in 1995 by Quentin Rae-Grant, who remained until 2004. In 2004, the journal started publishing monthly. Joel Paris became editor-in-chief in October 2004, continuing this role for 10 years. The current editor is Scott Patten, who has been in this role since 2014 The journal published 14 issues per year in 2005 and 2006, but returned to a monthly frequency in 2007. An electronic version of the journal was launched in January 2012. Because of the advertising, web access was restricted to members only in 2012 to avoid direct-to-consumer advertising. Articles had been freely accessible since 2002. In 2013, paid subscribers were also allowed access. As the Journal is now published by SAGE, access is governed by that company's policies. All members of the Canadian Psychiatric Association receive a subscription as a membership benefit.

== Abstracting and indexing ==
The journal is abstracted and indexed in Index Medicus/MEDLINE/PubMed, EMBASE, PsycINFO, Science Citation Index, EBSCO, and ProQuest. According to the Journal Citation Reports, the journal has a 2020 impact factor of 4.356, ranking it 33rd out of 144 SSCI journals in the category "Psychiatry". This places it in the first quartile of Psychiatry journals. In the SCIE index, it is ranked 51 out of 156.

== Online archives ==
The complete archive of the journal from 1956 to the present is available online. Full-text articles had been freely accessible since 2002. However, in January 2012, online access was restricted for six months, except for members of the Canadian Psychiatric Association who get immediate online access. In 2013, subscribers were allowed immediate online access.

== Notable articles ==
Examples of highly cited articles (>200 times) published in the journal are:

- Seeman, P (2002). "Atypical antipsychotics: Mechanism of action" (PDF). Canadian Journal of Psychiatry. 47 (1): 27–38. doi:10.1177/070674370204700106. PMID 11873706. S2CID 14930109. This review examined mechanisms of action of the atypical antipsychotic medications, emphasizing features of their pharmacology relevant to their profile of adverse effects.
- Ghaemi, SN; Ko, JY; Goodwin, FK (2002). "Cade's disease" and beyond: misdiagnosis, antidepressant use, and a proposed definition for bipolar spectrum disorder". Canadian Journal of Psychiatry. 47 (2): 125–134. doi:10.1177/070674370204700202. PMID 11926074. This was a critical review of nosological issues related to bipolar disorder. It also proposed diagnostic criteria for bipolar spectrum disorders, making a unique contribution to the latter topic.
- Taylor, GJ (2000). "Recent developments in alexithymia theory and research". Canadian Journal of Psychiatry. 45 (2): 134–142. doi:10.1177/070674370004500203. PMID 10742872. This review, by one of the developers of the Toronto Alexithymia Scale, examined literature concerned with alexithymia (an inability to identify and describe ones' emotions). The review summarized evidence that alexithymia reflects deficits in the cognitive processing and regulation of emotions. Implications for future research, and for psychotherapy, were identified.
- Newman, SC; Bland, RC (1991). "Mortality in a cohort of patients with schizophrenia: A record linkage study". Canadian Journal of Psychiatry. 36 (4): 239–245. doi:10.1177/070674379103600401. PMID 1868416. S2CID 12218094. This was a retrospective cohort study that evaluated mortality in a cohort with schizophrenia by linkage to a national mortality registry. A 20-fold increase in the risk of suicide was found, but elevated mortality due to other causes was also identified. Overall, the risk of mortality was doubled and it was estimated that life expectancy was diminished by approximately 20 years.
- Bradwejn, J; Koszycki, D; Meterissian, G (1990). "Cholecystokinin-tetrapeptide induces panic attacks in patients with panic disorder". Canadian Journal of Psychiatry. 35 (1): 83–85. doi:10.1177/070674379003500115. PMID 2180549. S2CID 32853975. In this study, cholecystokinin-tetrapeptide (CCK-4) and placebo were administered to 11 panic disorder patients. CCK-4 (but not placebo) was found to induce panic attack identical to the spontaneous panic attacks that occur in people with panic disorder.

== See also ==
- List of psychiatry journals
