= Betty Steiner =

Canadian psychiatrist

Betty Wilson Steiner-Conduit (1920 – February 16, 1994) was a Canadian psychiatrist. Steiner was the first head of the Gender Identity Clinic at the Clarke Institute of Psychiatry. She is known for her work with transgender and intersex people.

== Life and career ==
After completing her education in 1958, Steiner was appointed psychiatrist at the Women's College Hospital. She then took an appointment at the Clarke Institute of Psychiatry.

In 1985 she edited Gender Dysphoria, and in 1990, she co-edited Clinical management of gender identity disorders in children and adults with Ray Blanchard.

Steiner-Conduit married marketing executive Andrew Conduit in 1988. She and her husband died of carbon monoxide poisoning after leaving a car running in their garage. Steiner-Conduit was declared dead at the scene; Conduit died ten days later.

== Selected publications ==
- Blanchard R, Steiner BW (eds.) (1990). Clinical management of gender identity disorders in children and adults. American Psychiatric Press, ISBN 978-0-88048-187-8
- Blanchard R, Steiner BW, Clemmensen LH, Dickey R (1989). Prediction of regrets in postoperative transsexuals. Can J Psychiatry. 1989 Feb;34(1):43-5.PMID 2924248
- Blanchard R, Clemmensen LH, Steiner BW (1987). Heterosexual and homosexual gender dysphoria. Arch Sex Behav. 1987 Apr;16(2):139-52. PMID 3592961
- Blanchard R, Rachansky I, Steiner B (1986). Phallometric detection of fetishistic arousal in heterosexual male cross-dressers. Journal of Sex Research, 22, 1986: 452-462.
- Blanchard R, Clemmensen LH, Steiner BW (1985). Social desirability response set and systematic distortion in the self-report of adult male gender patients. Arch Sex Behav. 1985 Dec;14(6):505-16. PMID 4084050
- Steiner BW (ed.) (1985) Gender dysphoria: development, research, management. Plenum Press, ISBN 978-0-306-41694-1
- Blanchard R, Steiner BW, Clemmensen LH (1985). Gender dysphoria, gender reorientation, and the clinical management of transsexualism. J Consult Clin Psychol. 1985 Jun;53(3):295-304. PMID 4008715
- Blanchard R, McConkey JG, Roper V, Steiner BW (1983). Measuring physical aggressiveness in heterosexual, homosexual, and transsexual males. Arch Sex Behav. 1983 Dec;12(6):511-24. PMID 6667110
- Blanchard R, Clemmensen LH, Steiner BW (1983). Gender reorientation and psychosocial adjustment in male-to-female transsexuals. Arch Sex Behav. 1983 Dec;12(6):503-9. PMID 6667109
- Freund K, Steiner BW, Chan S (1982). Two types of cross-gender identity. Arch Sex Behav. 1982 Feb;11(1):49-63. PMID 7073469
- Steiner BW (1981). From Sappho to Stand: historical perspective on crossdressing and cross gender. Can J Psychiatry. 1981 Nov;26(7):502-6. PMID 702824
- Steiner BW, Bernstein SM (1981). Female-to-male transsexuals and their partners. Can J Psychiatry. 1981 Apr;26(3):178-82. PMID 7237357
- Bernstein SM, Steiner BW, Glaister JT, Muir CF (1981). Changes in patients with gender-identity problems after parental death. Am J Psychiatry. 1981 Jan;138(1):41-5. PMID 7446780
- Steiner BW, Satterberg JA, Muir CF (1978). Flight into femininity. The male menopause? Can Psychiatr Assoc J. 1978 Oct;23(6):405-10. PMID 709491
- Bradley SJ, Steiner B, Zucker K, Doering RW, Sullivan J, Finegan JK, Richardson M (1978). Gender identity problems of children and adolescents: the establishment of a special clinic. Can Psychiatr Assoc J. 1978 Apr;23(3):175-83. PMID 647617
- Freund K, Langevin R, Satterberg J, Steiner B (1977). Extension of the Gender Identity Scale for Males. Arch Sex Behav. 1977 Nov;6(6):507-19. PMID 931627
- Langevin R, Paitich D, Steiner B (1977). The clinical profile of male transsexuals living as females vs. those living as males. Arch Sex Behav. 1977 Mar;6(2):143-54. PMID 849139
- Nelson C, Paitich D, Steiner BW (1976). Medicolegal aspects of transsexualism. Can Psychiatr Assoc J. 1976 Dec;21(8):557-64. PMID 1024695
- Garfinkel PE, Steiner BW, Hunter RC (1974). The processes of psychiatric residency training. II. Trainees who drop out. Can Psychiatr Assoc J. 1974 Apr;19(2):201-6. PMID 4829419
- Steiner BW, Garfinkel PE, Hunter RC (1974). The processes of psychiatric residency training. I. Selection of trainees and the outcome of training. Can Psychiatr Assoc J. 1974 Apr;19(2):193-200. PMID 4829418
- Freund K, Nagler E, Langevin R, Zajac A, Steiner B (1974). Measuring feminine gender identity in homosexual males. Archives of Sexual Behavior, 3, 1974: 249-260. PMID 4836843
- Freund K, Langevin R, Zajac Y, Steiner B, Zajac A (1974). Parent-child relations in transsexual and non-transsexual homosexual males. Br J Psychiatry. 1974 Jan;124(578):22-3. PMID 4822411
- Freund K, Langevin R, Zajac Y, Steiner B, Zajac A (1974). The trans-sexual syndrome in homosexual males. J Nerv Ment Dis. 1974 Feb;158(2):145-53. PMID 4813925
- Steiner BW, Zajac AS, Mohr JW (1974). A gender identity project. The organization of a multidisciplinary study. Can Psychiatr Assoc J. 1974 Feb;19(1):7-12. PMID 4812981
- Steiner BW (1973). The crisis of middle age. Can Med Assoc J. 1973 Nov 17;109(10):1017-8 passim. PMID 4758860
