= IRAS 13218+0552 =

Galaxy merger located in the constellation Virgo

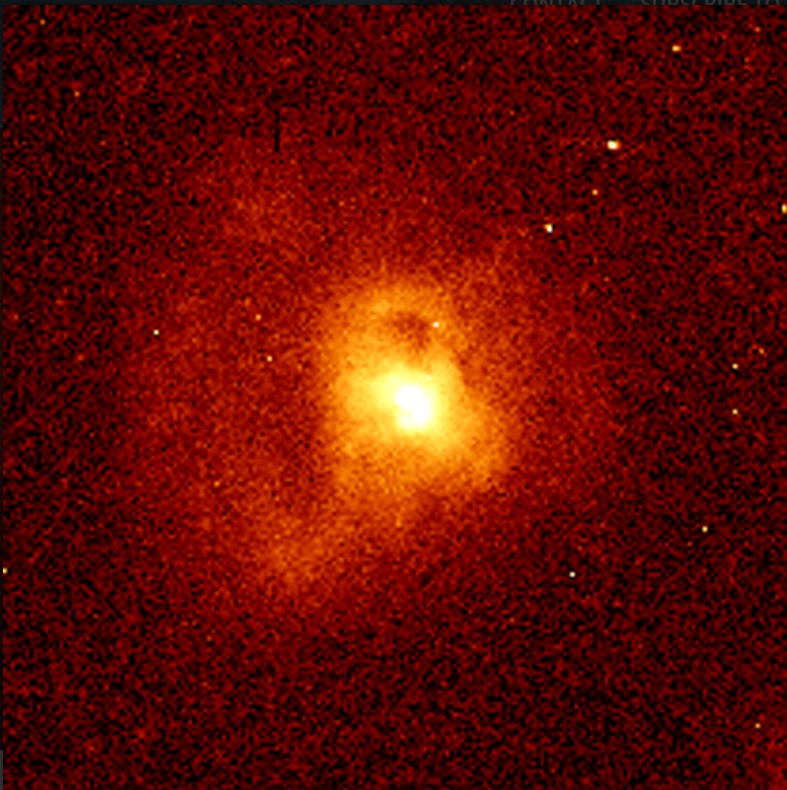
- Hubble Space Telescope image of IRAS 13218+0552

Observation data (J2000 epoch)
- Constellation: Virgo
- Right ascension: 13h 24m 19.89s
- Declination: +05d 37m 04.7s
- Redshift: 0.202806
- Heliocentric radial velocity: 60,800 km/s
- Distance: 2.615 Gly
- Apparent magnitude (V): 0.085
- Apparent magnitude (B): 0.112
- Surface brightness: 18.4

Characteristics
- Type: Sy1, ULIRG
- Size: 0.15' x 0.13'
- Notable features: Luminous infrared galaxy

Other designations
- F2M J132419.90+053705.02, PGC 165618, NVSS J132420+053709, H 1321+058, IRAS F13218+0552, LQAC 201+005 001

IRAS 13218+0552 known as SFRS 263, is a galaxy merger located in the constellation Virgo. Its redshift is 0.202806, putting the object at 2.6 billion light-years away from Earth. It is a Seyfert galaxy and a luminous infrared galaxy.

== Characteristics ==
IRAS 13218+0552 is classified as a Seyfert type 1.5 galaxy given its large [OIII] flux although XMM-Newton did not observe it. Further studies showed it as a Seyfert type 2 galaxy instead, as it harbors a highly obscured active galactic nucleus and not of Seyfert 1 type. Moreover, it belongs to the ultraluminous galaxy classification, because according to IRAS, its luminosity range Lir = 10^{12}-10^{13} L⊙ is found to be approximated by the power law of Φ(L) ~ L-2.35[Mpc-3 mag-1].

Besides being a Seyfert galaxy and a luminous inflared galaxy, IRAS 13218+0552 also has a quasar nucleus which is notable for its extreme outflows and has strong star formations. That being said, it resulted from a collision between two gas-rich disk galaxies. Evidence showed both galaxies have orbited each other several times before merging with each other; signs left included distinct loops of glowing gas around the quasar's host. Apart from the loop of gas, IRAS 13218+0552 has a tidal tail feature and possibly binary nucleus with its separation smaller than 1 kpc.

Detected through targeted surveys, observations find IRAS 13218+0552 hosts an OH megamaser (OHM), producing nonthermal emission from the hydroxyl (OH) molecules, with its two main lines situated at 1665/166 MHz and two satellite lines at 1612/1720 MHz. This might be caused by OHM emission being pumped by infrared radiation from the galaxy's environment and also amplification of an intense radio continuum background. Through the observation, IRAS 13218+0552 has an OH spectrum showing two prominent broad emission peaks, having a separation of 490 km s^{−1} in its rest frame, suggesting it is associated with multiple nuclei. This makes IRAS 13218+0552 among 119 OHMs found in ultraluminous galaxies right up to 2014.
