= Malabaristas de Semáforo =

Brazilian rock band

- Origin: Rio de Janeiro, Brazil
- Genres: Punk rock, post-punk, stoner rock
- Years active: 2013–present
- Label: Caravela
- Members: Cleber ST; Pedro Grisolia; Alex (Lekin)
- Past members: Fabrício Cardozo

Malabaristas de Semáforo is a Brazil rock band formed in 2013 in Rio de Janeiro. They're composed of vocalist/bassist Cleber ST, guitarist Pedro Grisolia and drummer Alex (Lekin).

The name of the group, which means "Traffic Light Jugglers", is a tribute to street artists who perform juggling by traffic lights and who "face adversities to bring beauty wherever they go".

After they published eight songs on SoundCloud, they released their first work in 2017: an EP titled Malabas, containing four tracks. The first full-length album, Lado B ("B Side"), was released on 20 July 2018 via Caravela and produced by Celo Oliveira, with Cleber ST, Pedro Grisolia and drummer Fabrício Cardozo. It was preceded by the singles "Tédio" ("Boredom"), released in March 2018, and "Normose" ("Normopathy"), released on 18 May 2018 and based on the concept that refers to the pathology of willing to adapt oneself to the social expectations while disregarding one's own personal identity.

In February 2021, they released the single "O Peso do Medo e da Dúvida" ("The Weight of Fear and Doubt"), with footage of the members recorded separately due to the COVID-19 pandemic. By then, they had Alex (Lekin) replacing Cardozo. The single is expected to be part of their follow-up album, which will also contain the single "Nunca Ser Igual" ("Never Be the Same").

== Members ==
Current

- Cleber ST — vocals and bass
- Pedro Grisolia — guitar
- Alex (Lekin) — drums

Former

- Fabrício Cardozo — drums

== Discography ==
=== EPs ===
- Malabas (2017)

=== Studio albums ===
- Lado B (2018)

=== Singles ===
- "Tédio" (2018)
- "Normose" (2018)
- "O Peso do Medo e da Dúvida" (2021)
- "Nunca Ser Igual" (2021)
