= Normopathy =

Psychological disorder

Normopathy is the pathological pursuit of conformity and societal acceptance at the expense of individuality. In her book, Plea for a Measure of Abnormality, psychoanalyst Joyce McDougall coined the term normopathy to describe fear of individuality. Normopathy is difficult to diagnose because normopaths are integrated in society. Normopaths depend on social approval and validation.

Christopher Bollas studied normopathy during the 1970s and 1980s with patients who had nervous breakdowns. Bollas, who called it normotic illness, considered it an obsession with fitting into society at the cost of the person's own personality. Normopaths experience emotional crisis – such as a teenager fumbling a football during a game at school – as a mania, and resort to violence or other dangerous behavior.

Normopaths often feel crippled, unable to speak or act. Normopaths perform best given a strict protocol to follow. It can cost some people a job or interfere with relationships. Normopaths constantly seek outside validation. The normopath may ask a friend what they think about a new song, dress or hairstyle before forming an opinion. Normopaths look to others to inform them how to think or believe.

The concept of normopathy parallels Winnicott’s idea of the false self, which is formed in response to the demands of the external environment rather than from within. Cognitive behavioral therapy is applied in treatment of normopathy to find individuality and restructure self-image.

== Definition ==
Normopathy is defined as:

- Anxiety of examining one’s psyche with diminished curiosity about inner life.
- Hyper-rationality in dealing with others and an intense focus on factual data to seek reassurance, as according to Bollas, “the normopath attempts to become an object in the object world.” For the normopath, human feelings are troublemakers that require “formulaic structuring in order to be controllable.” Because Normopaths can't fully go through the cycle of grief, they develop what Bollas calls “a strangely deformed mourning."
- Loss of connection between feeling and speech.
- Horizontal thinking, the inability to prioritize and create relative values and meaning.
- Homogeneity, all ideas and actions seem equally valid. Fumbling a ball and suicide reside on the same phenomenological plane as actions are wildly out of sync with affect.
- Operational thinking, turning thought immediately into action.

== See also ==
- List of mental disorders
- Alexithymia
- Herd mentality
- Groupthink
- Individuation
