= Social-pragmatic theory =

Social-pragmatic theory may refer to:

- Developmental social-pragmatic model, a therapy approach to autism spectrum disorders
- Social-pragmatic theory of language acquisition which has also been linked to autism studies

== See also ==
- Language acquisition device
- Statistical learning theory
