= Disaffectation =

The term disaffectation was coined by French psychoanalyst Joyce McDougall as a strictly psychoanalytic term for alexithymia, a neurological condition characterized by severe lack of emotional awareness. McDougall felt that alexithymia had become too strongly classified as a neuroanatomical defect and concretized as an intractable illness leaving little room for a purely psychoanalytic explanation for this phenomenon.

In coining the term McDougall hoped to indicate the behavior of people who had experienced overwhelming emotion that threatened to attack their sense of integrity and identity. Such individuals, unable to repress the ideas linked to emotional pain and equally unable to project these feelings delusively onto representations of other people, simply ejected them from consciousness by "pulverizing all trace of feeling, so that an experience which has caused emotional flooding is not recognized as such and therefore cannot be contemplated". They were not suffering from an inability to experience or express emotion, but from "an inability to contain and reflect over an excess of affective experience."

'Disaffectation' conveys a deliberate double meaning. The Latin prefix dis-, indicates separation or loss and suggests, metaphorically, that certain people are psychologically separated from their emotions and may have "lost" the capacity to be in touch with interior psychic reality. Also included in this prefix is the secondary meaning from the Greek dys- with its implication of illness.

According to Professor of Psychiatry of the University of Toronto, Graeme Taylor, this psychoanalytic conceptualization departs from older, less applicable theories which emphasized the role of unconscious neurotic conflicts, and instead facilitates a psychoanalytic model of physical illness and disease based on the operation of primitive pre-neurotic pathology that has failed to achieve psychic representation. Henry Krystal Professor of Psychiatry at Michigan State University agreed, adding that it is useful to separate the consideration of psychotherapy for the "disaffected" individual from that of the classical psychosomatic neuroses. To Krystal this consideration is important because "since these patients may develop serious, even occasionally fatal exacerbations of illness during psychotherapy, treating them with psychotherapy for psychosomatic illness is not indicated". This distinction has allowed the field of psychoanalysis to contribute constructively to the field of psychosomatic medicine.

== See also ==
- Amplification (psychology)
- Psychological mindedness
- Emotional Intelligence
- Alexithymia
- Empathy
