= Somatosensory amplification =

Medical symptom

Somatosensory amplification (SSA) is a tendency to perceive normal somatic and visceral sensations as being relatively intense, disturbing and noxious. It is a common feature of hypochondriasis and is commonly found with chronic fatigue syndrome, fibromyalgia, major depressive disorder, anxiety disorders, autism spectrum disorder, and alexithymia. One common clinical measure of SSA is the Somatosensory Amplification Scale (SSAS).

The term "amplification of bodily sensations" was coined by Dr. Arthur J. Barsky in 1979 to explain why patients with the same medical disease experienced symptoms differently. He described it as "a temporally stable, generalised feature" of hypochondriasis. In the 1980s, the term "somatosensory amplification" (SSA) was first used.

It is unclear whether persons with SSA have a truly increased physiological sensitivity to bodily sensations. One study paradoxically found lower levels of SSA in hypochondriacs who reported being constantly aware of their own heartbeats. Tentative electroencephalography results tend to indicate SSA is more likely due to differences in long-latency cognitive processing, rather than objective physiological differences in sensitivity.

It is not currently known whether SSA causes or is caused by any of these conditions, only that they are comorbid conditions. One small study found that, in patients with depression, SSA may be part of the depression (i.e., treating the depression reduced the SSA).

== Characteristics ==
SSA has three main components which are both sensory ("lower-level") and cognitive-emotional ("higher-level"): being overly attentive to bodily sensations, "focusing on rare and weak body sensations", and "the tendency to appraise ambiguous or vague visceral and somatic sensations as abnormal, pathological, and symptomatic of disease, rather than considering them to be normal."

The cognitive-emotional process may be the outcome of the sensory process, leading to many criticisms towards this conceptualisation of SSA. According to a study, the first component of SSA may be more accurately described as body awareness, i.e. the tendency to focus on one's body. SSA leads to bodily sensations being felt as symptoms of disease and to symptoms being felt more intensely.

A review conceptualises SSA as an amplification of internal and external stimuli which are perceived as threatening to the body's integrity. It states that SSA involves an emotional and automatic response to stimuli which leads them to be perceived as threatening, giving rise to worries and anxiety. This process may remain subconscious, making the individual unable to detect and describe it, linking SSA to alexithymia.

According to Barsky, sensations which may be amplified are:

"1) normal physiological sensations such as intestinal peristalsis, postural hypotension. and changes in heart rate; 2) benign dysfunctions and trivial, self-limited infirmities such as transient tinnitis, a twitching eyelid, or dry skin; 3) the visceral and somatic concomitants of intense affect, such as the sympathetic arousal accompanying anxiety; and 4) the symptoms of serious nonpsychiatric medical disease and end-organ pathology."

SSA has features of an enduring trait, but it is also state-like.

== Causes ==
Bodily sensations may be amplified by psychological stress or through the belief that one's bodily sensations are symptoms of illness (cognition), expecting oneself or others to be ill (context), being anxious or depressed, for example (mood), or paying attention to the sensations (attention). Some individuals may "amplify all forms of distress."

According to a study, high SSAS scores are predicted by depression and disease phobia in patients with panic disorder and by bodily preoccupation and health habits in patients with hypochondriasis.

SSA may be acquired in childhood following adverse experiences or it may be an innate trait. From an individual perspective, an unstable attachment style or early adverse experiences may enhance an infant's threat-detection mechanism, this then becoming internalised despite losing its adaptive value. From an evolutionary perspective, SSA may help in assessing risk and taking the appropriate action in a demanding situation, suggesting that SSA might not be maladaptive.

== Associated conditions ==
SSA is related to many features of diseases. SSA is associated with hypochondriasis, alexithymia, and somatic symptoms. Alexithymia, characterised by difficulty with introspection, was measured by the Toronto Alexithymia Scale (TAS), a self-report scale, so the result may be less reliable. SSA, neuroticism, and negative affectivity (the latter two being risk factors of psychopathology) are related, potentially linking SSA with psychopathology. SSA is linked to anxiety and depression, as well as idiopathic environmental intolerances (IEI), expectations and intensity of symptoms, side effects, and modern health worries (MHWs).

== Usefulness ==
=== Hypochondriasis ===
SSA has been hypothesised to be the mechanism which links the perception of bodily sensations with the development of hypochondriasis. Patients with hypochondriasis may be more sensitive to bodily sensations, hence feeling them more intensely. They might therefore believe they have a disease and focus on sensations confirming their belief while ignoring those which don't, further reinforcing their belief.

=== Somatisation ===
SSA might aid in the understanding of somatisation. Health-related information or knowing that somebody else has an illness could lead to the belief that sensations previously not understood are symptoms of disease. This makes the sensations feel more disturbing which increases focus on the body. The individual begins searching for proof they are ill by re-attributing previously subconscious or normal sensations to their presumed illness, further reinforcing their belief.

=== Symptom variation ===
SSA may explain why patients experience symptoms differently to other patients with the same condition, or more intensely than their organ pathology indicates.

=== Other ===
If internal or external stimuli are perceived as threatening, but their source is unknown, the most easily available information (from the media, for example) will be used to find the source. "This can lead to more attribution errors as in the case of idiopathic environmental intolerances or non-specific medication side effects." When amplified stimuli are attributed to modern technologies or electromagnetic fields (EMFs), MHWs and IEI-EMF may develop, respectively.

According to a study, "Our results suggest that SSA may be involved in the development of nocebo effects through an increased internal focus, elevated subjective symptom report, and anxiety." It may also play a role in the development of conditions which are not well-understood, such as "irritable bowel syndrome, fibromyalgia, hypoglycemia, and chronic fatigue syndrome." SSA may be present in psychiatric conditions, including those which involve somatic symptoms, such as panic disorder or depression.

According to a review, SSA allows for the study of symptoms independently, which would lead to a greater understanding of how patients experience symptoms and how to alleviate them. Furthermore, it may facilitate understanding of the placebo effect, and why some patients are unaware of their symptoms and seek treatment for their illness late ("minimizers").

== See also ==
- Supertaster
- Multiple chemical sensitivity, associated with smell sensitivity
- Tetrachromacy
