= Psychological mindedness =

Person's capacity for self-examination

Psychological mindedness is a person's capacity for self-examination, self-reflection, introspection and personal insight. It includes an ability to recognize meanings that underlie overt words and actions, to appreciate emotional nuance and complexity, to recognize the links between past and present, and insight into one's own and others' motives and intentions. Psychologically minded people have above average insight into mental life.

Conceptual definitions of psychological mindedness have included variant, but related descriptions. Some definitions relate solely to the self, "a person's ability to see relationships among thoughts, feelings, and actions with the goal of learning the meanings and causes of his experiences and behaviors". Conte (1996) extended the concept beyond self-focus, as involving "... both self-understanding and an interest in the motivation and behavior of others". Hall's (1992) definition introduces the multidimensional nature of PM. She defined it as "reflectivity about psychological processes, relationships and meanings [that] is displayed by ... both interest in and ability for such reflectivity across affective and intellectual dimensions".

== PDM description ==
The Psychodynamic Diagnostic Manual (PDM) describes psychological mindedness as an individual's ability to observe and reflect on his or her own internal life. The PDM details a four-point scale from high to low psychological mindedness, or 'healthy-to-impaired functioning'.

1. Can reflect on (i.e. observe and experience at the same time) a full range of own and others' feelings or experiences (including subtle variations in feelings). Can reflect both in the present and with reference to a longer-term view of self, values, and goals. Can reflect on multiple relationships between feelings and experiences, across the full range of age-expected experiences in the context of new challenges.
2. Can reflect on feelings or experiences of self and others both in the present and with reference to a longer-term view of a sense of self, values, and goals for some age-expected experiences, but not others. Cannot be reflective in this way when feelings are strong.
3. Can reflect on moment-to-moment experiences, but not with reference to a longer-term sense of self and experiences, values, and goals.
4. Unable to reflect genuinely on feelings or experiences, even in the present. Self-awareness consists often of polarized feeling states or simple basic feelings without an appreciation of subtle variations in feelings. Self-awareness is lacking, and there may be a tendency toward fragmentation.

== Personality correlates ==
Psychological mindedness (PM) is expected to be related to psychological strength and negatively related to weakness. One study found a correlation between PM and two of the Big Five personality traits (extraversion and openness to experience) and a negative correlation with neuroticism. Other studies have linked it to the tolerance of ambiguity, mindfulness, empathy and positive adjustment to college. PM has also been associated negatively with problem-oriented psychological constructs such as the personality factor of neuroticism, the cognitive constructs of magical thinking and external locus of control, and early maladaptive schemas. Low PM has also been linked to alexithymia, suggesting that certain clinical patients do not respond to counseling due to a lack of PM.

== In groups, environments and society ==
In the UK a lot of work has been done to extend the concept of psychological mindedness beyond the individual. This work recognises that the health and success of families, schools, hospitals, businesses, communities and indeed society as a whole depends in a large part on the psychological mindedness of the system or environment created by that institution. This is more than the sum of the individual parts. For example, an individual nurse on a psychiatric ward may be psychologically minded and motivated to connect with a service user who may also have some psychological mindedness. However, the chances of two such individuals having a psychologically minded encounter can easily be sabotaged by a "psychologically blind" or "alexithymic" care system that allows the nurse no time, no headspace, no structure and no back up to function in this way. It is well known that nurses on chaotic psychiatric wards have to shut off emotionally just to survive personally in the face of the overwhelming demands placed upon them. Once this happens the experience for the service user will obviously become one of "not being listened to". This real emotional neglect coupled with transference factors is what leads to so many incidents on our psychiatric wards. Service users who feel rejected are bound to escalate their behaviour in order to be heard and in order to "hit back" at those who are in effect just repeating the failures of past caregivers. Psychological mindedness is also relevant to social work in multiple aspects. Social workers use interventions such as Motivational Interviewing in order to help people understand their own thoughts and feelings. Additionally, social workers recognise that individuals are experts in their own life, encouraging listening and psychological mindedness. Social workers having psychological mindedness in relation to themselves, enables them to understand their own thoughts and feelings and ensure that their personal values do not impact upon their professional practice.

Martin Seager (2006) developed the concept of "psychological safety" to explain and address these kinds of problems in health care systems. Out of this work, Martin was invited by the then secretary of state for health, Patricia Hewitt, to form in 2007 a "national advisory group" on the universal psychological principles and standards underpinning good mental health care. Martin was able to convene a group of distinguished thinkers from the full range of psychological approaches to produce a guiding document. Group members included Susie Orbach, Andrew Samuels, Lucy Johnstone and Valerie Sinason. The core recommendations of this group took account of all psychological theory and spiritual factors in the human condition. "Psychological mindedness" was the concept and the phrase that seemed to bind everything together. This work has led to the formation of a further national working group (2008) on the back of the Improving Access to Psychological Therapies (IAPT) initiative in the UK. This new working group is looking at "10 high impact changes" for mental health policy in the UK that will increase psychological mindedness. The group aims to stimulate a proactive public health psychological policy that will address the relational and environmental causes of mental health problems and shift the emphasis away from an exclusive focus on reactive psychological treatments. It was found that females tend to be more psychologically minded than males.

== See also ==
- Alexithymia
- Disaffectation
- Emotional intelligence
- Human self-reflection
- Mentalization
- Metacognition
- Mindfulness
