= R. Michael Bagby =

Canadian psychologist

Robert Michael Bagby (born 1953) is a Canadian psychologist, senior clinician scientist and director of clinical research at the Centre for Addiction and Mental Health (CAMH). He is a full professor in the Department of Psychiatry, University of Toronto. He became a full professor of psychology at the University of Toronto Scarborough campus in July 2011.

Early research interests revolved around psychology and the law having been educated as a forensic psychologist. He also brought awareness to the personality construct alexithymia by developing the Toronto Alexithymia Scale (TAS-20) to measure its qualities. With the revision of the MMPI-2, Bagby was significantly involved in validating test scores, with a specific focus on being able to identify individuals feigning and/or malingering mental illness. More recently, he has investigated the possibility that Five factor model personality facets could be used to identify many psychiatric conditions with a focus on dimensional versus a categorical approaches that the DSM-IV takes and the newer DSM-5 is said to emphasize.
