= Autism =

Condition involving social and behavioral differences

- Other names: Autism spectrum disorder, (Note: Medical diagnosis term. See § Classification.) autism spectrum condition; Formerly: Kanner syndrome/autistic disorder/childhood autism, Asperger syndrome, childhood disintegrative disorder, pervasive developmental disorder not otherwise specified
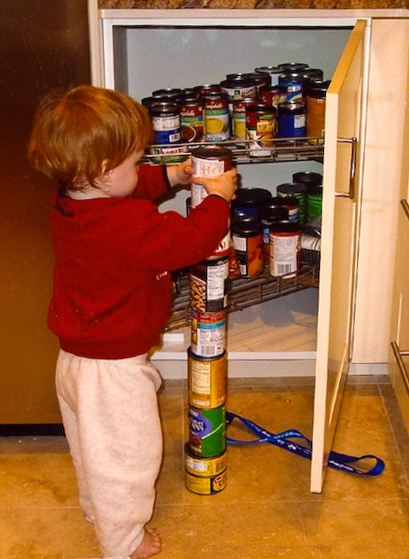
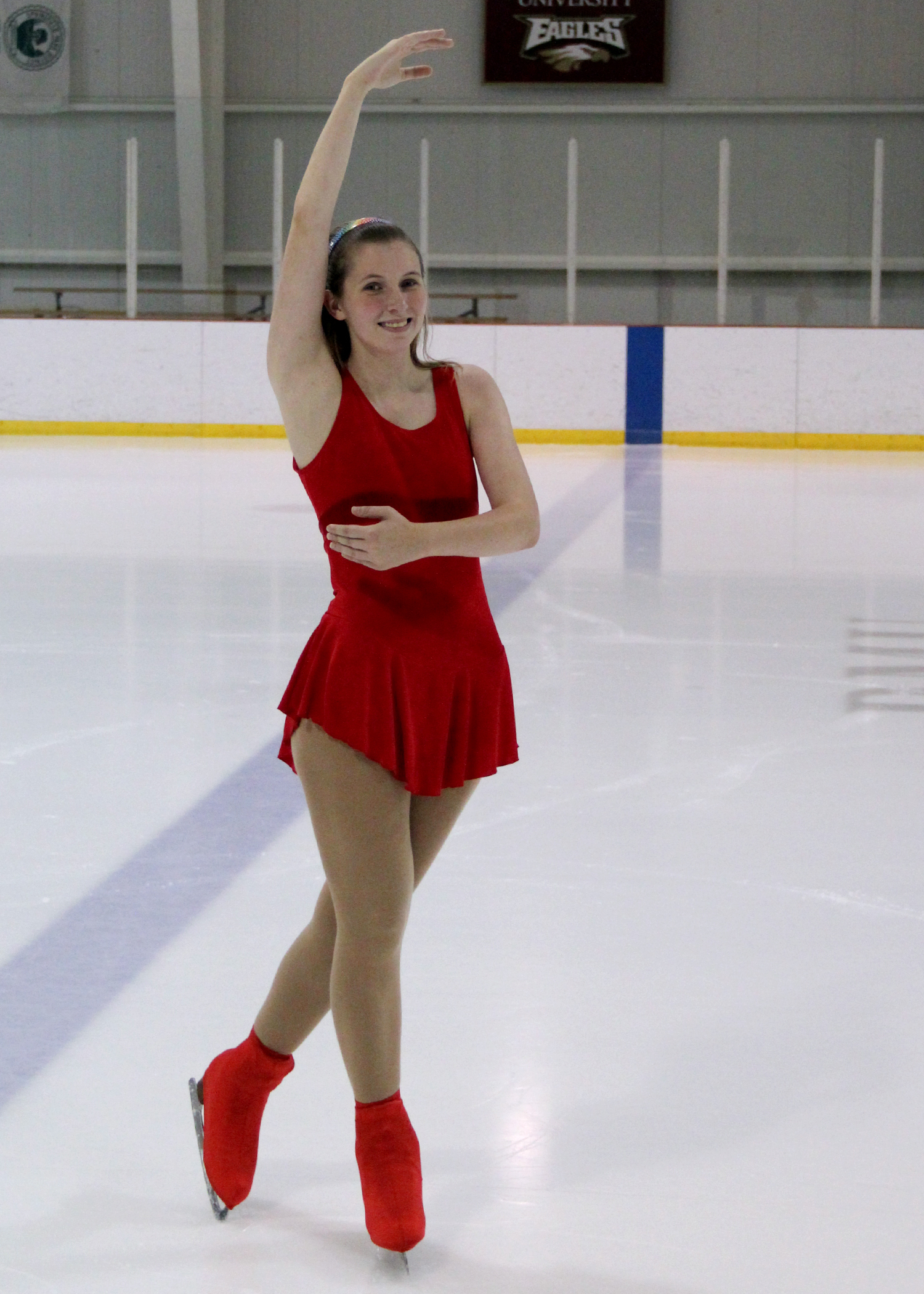
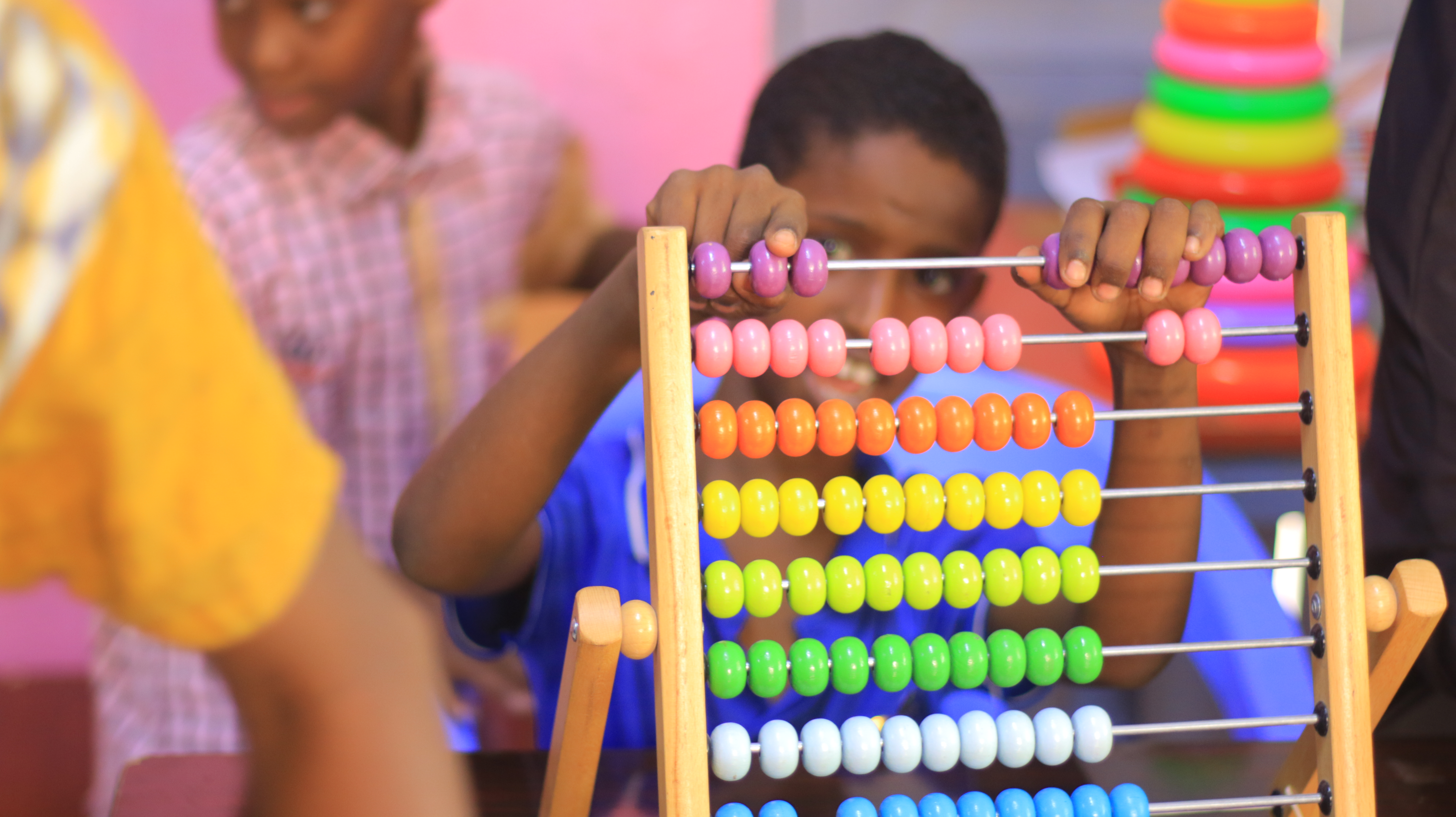
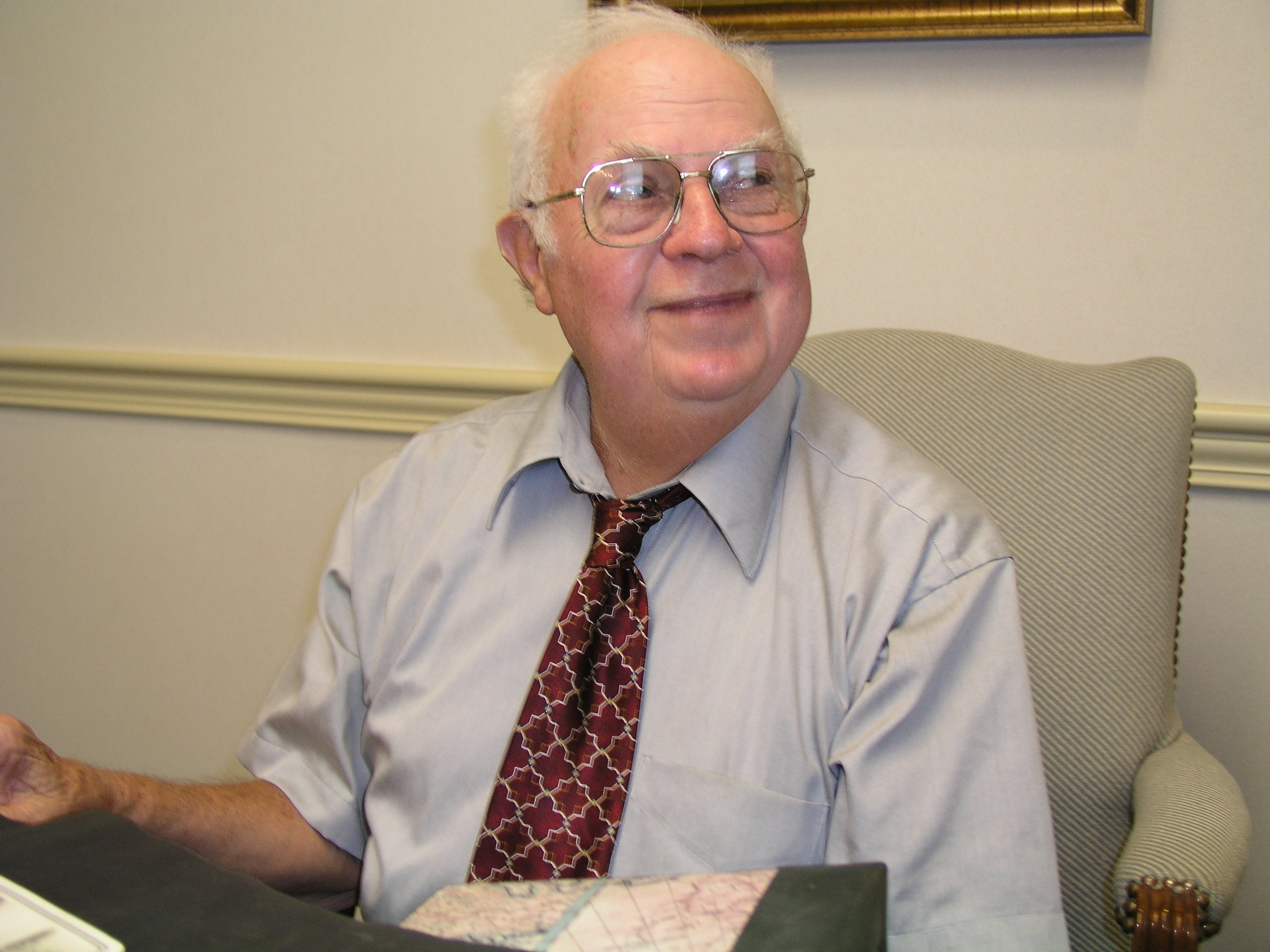
- Autism has many presentations around the world. From top left: an autistic toddler stacking cans; autistic competitive figure skater Erin Hart; a child using an abacus at a school run by Autism Somalia Center; banker Donald Triplett, the first person to be diagnosed with autism.
- Specialty: Psychiatry (neuropsychiatry), clinical psychology, pediatrics, occupational medicine
- Symptoms: Difficulties in social interaction, verbal and nonverbal communication; inflexible routines; focused interests; repetitive behaviors; unusual sensory responses
- Complications: Social isolation, educational and employment problems, anxiety, stress, bullying, depression, self-harm, suicidality
- Onset: Early childhood
- Duration: Lifelong
- Causes: Multifactorial, with many uncertain factors
- Risk factors: Family history, certain genetic conditions, having older parents, certain prescribed drugs, perinatal and neonatal health issues
- Diagnostic method: Based on a combination of clinical observation of behavior and development and comprehensive diagnostic testing completed by a team of qualified professionals. For adults, the use of a patient's written and oral history of autistic traits becomes more important
- Differential diagnosis: Attention deficit hyperactivity disorder, intellectual disability, language disorders, social (pragmatic) communication disorder, selective mutism, stereotypic movement disorder, Rett syndrome, anxiety disorders, obsessive–compulsive disorder, schizophrenia, fragile X syndrome, personality disorders, nonverbal learning disorder
- Management: Applied behavior analysis, cognitive behavioral therapy, occupational therapy, speech–language pathology
- Frequency: One in 100 people (1%) worldwide

Autism, also known as autism spectrum disorder (ASD), is a condition characterized by impairment in social communication and interaction, as well as a need or strong preference for predictability and routine, sensory processing differences, focused interests, or repetitive behaviors. Features of autism are present from early childhood and the condition typically persists throughout life. Autism is classified as a neurodevelopmental disorder, and a diagnosis requires professional assessment that these characteristics cause significant challenges in daily life beyond what is expected given a person's age and social environment. Because autism is a spectrum disorder, presentations vary and support needs range from minimal assistance to full-time, 24-hour care.

Autism diagnoses have risen since the 1990s, largely because of broader diagnostic criteria, greater awareness, and wider access to assessment. Changing social demands may also play a role. The World Health Organization estimates that about 1 in 100 children were diagnosed between 2012 and 2021, noting an increasing trend. (Note: This figure may reflect an underestimate of prevalence in low- and middle-income countries.) Surveillance studies suggest a similar share of the adult population would meet diagnostic criteria if formally assessed. Autism is highly heritable and involves many genes, while environmental factors appear to play a smaller, mainly prenatal role. Boys are diagnosed several times more often than girls, with girls being better at hiding autistic traits. Conditions such as anxiety, depression, attention deficit hyperactivity disorder (ADHD), epilepsy, as well as intellectual disability, are more common among autistic people. Autistic people are also more likely to be a part of the LGBTQ community. Certain savant abilities are also more common in autistic people than in other groups.

There is no cure for autism. Several autism therapies aim to improve self-care, social, and language skills. Reducing environmental and social barriers helps autistic people participate more fully in education, employment, and other aspects of life. No medication addresses the core features of autism, but some are used to help manage commonly co-occurring conditions, such as anxiety, depression, irritability, ADHD, and epilepsy.

The idea of autism as a disorder has been challenged by the neurodiversity framework, which frames autistic traits as a healthy variation of the human condition. This perspective, promoted by the autism rights movement, has attracted increasing research attention, but is debated and remains controversial among autistic people, advocacy groups, healthcare providers, and charities.

In recent years, the autism spectrum has controversially been criticized as overly inclusionary by some researchers and caretakers of autistic people, who accordingly propose that autistic people able to live an independent life should be clinically distinguished from those who require continuous assistance.

== Signs and characteristics ==
Autism is primarily characterized by differences and difficulties in social interaction and communication, alongside restricted or repetitive patterns of interests, activities, or behaviors (stimming), and, in many cases, distinctive reactions to sensory input. The specific presentation varies widely. Clinicians often consider assessment for autism when these characteristics are present, especially if they are associated with difficulty obtaining or sustaining employment or education, difficulty initiating or maintaining social relationships, involvement with mental health or learning disability services, or a history of neurodevelopmental conditions (including learning disabilities and ADHD) or mental health conditions. In most cases, signs of autism are first observable in infancy or early childhood and remain throughout life. Autistic people may be significantly disabled in some respects, but average—or, in some cases, superior—in others.

=== Social and communication skills ===
Autistic people may have differences and difficulties in social communication and interaction, which can lead to challenges in environments structured around non-autistic norms. Diagnostic criteria for autism require difficulties across three social domains: social–emotional reciprocity, nonverbal communication, and developing and maintaining relationships.

==== Social–emotional reciprocity ====
Common early signs of autism include little or no babbling in infancy. Difficulties may also be apparent in traditional forms of reciprocal social interaction, such as games like peek-a-boo or pat-a-cake, as well as in shared attention to objects of interest; this may distinguish autistic from non-autistic infants.

Historically, autistic children were said to be delayed in developing a theory of mind, and the empathizing–systemizing theory proposed that while autistic people may have compassion (affective empathy) for others with similar autistic traits, they often have limited, though not necessarily absent, cognitive empathy. This may present as social naïvety, lower-than-average intuitive perception of the meaning or utility of body language, social reciprocity, or social expectations, including the habitus, social cues, and certain aspects of sarcasm, which to some degree may be influenced by alexithymia. A 2019 meta-analysis found that alexithymia commonly co-occurs in autism (49.93%) and infrequently in neurotypicals (4.89%); the random effects risk ratio (6.50) was statistically significant (p<0.001). Furthermore, a 2024 study found that the interaction effect between Autism-Spectrum Quotient (AQ) scores and Toronto Alexithymia Scale (TAS) was statistically significant, indicating a modulative role in regulating the relationship between autism and emotion; According to Taylor et al. (2024): "Thus, TAS scores did not impact on classification accuracy for participants with lower AQ scores but increases in TAS were associated with poorer emoji classification for higher AQ participants" (pp.2215).

Recent research has increasingly questioned these earlier interpretations, as the double empathy problem theory (2012) proposes that misunderstandings arise mutually between autistic and non-autistic people, rather than solely from autistic deficits in empathy or social cognition. This perspective has contributed to a growing recognition that autistic behavior and communication may reflect different, rather than deficient, social behavior and communication styles. Autistic interests and conversational styles are often characterized by a strong focus on specific topics, a phenomenon known as monotropism.

==== Spoken communication ====
Differences in verbal communication often become noticeable in early childhood, as many autistic children develop language skills at an uneven pace. Speech may emerge later than is typical or not at all (non-speaking autism), while reading ability may be present before school age (hyperlexia). Infants may show delayed onset of babbling, atypical gestures, lower responsiveness, or vocal patterns that are less synchronized with caregivers. During the second and third years, autistic children may produce less frequent and less varied babbling, consonants, words, and word combinations, and may integrate gestures with speech less often. They are less likely to make requests or share experiences, and more likely to repeat others' words or phrases (echolalia). About 25–35% of autistic school-age children are non-speaking or minimally speaking. The age at which speech develops and the complexity of early language development are significant predictors of verbal communication abilities in later life.

==== Nonverbal communication ====
Autistic people often display atypical behaviors or differences in nonverbal communication. Some may make infrequent eye contact, even when called by name, or avoid it altogether because they find it uncomfortable, distracting, or overstimulating. Some autistic people say maintaining eye contact feels invasive or causes sensory overload. They may recognize fewer emotions or interpret facial expressions differently, and may not respond with expressions expected by their non-autistic peers. They can also have difficulty inferring social context or subtext in conversation or text, resulting in different interpretations of meaning. Speech characteristics such as volume, rhythm, and intonation (prosody) can vary, and atypical prosody is estimated to occur in at least half of autistic children.

==== Developing and sustaining relationships ====
Signs of autism in childhood include less apparent interest in other children or caregivers, possibly with more interest in objects. Behaviors that may appear as indifference to non-autistic people often reflect autistic differences in recognizing others' personalities, perspectives, and interests. Most research has focused on interpersonal relationship difficulties between autistic and non-autistic people and on teaching social skills to address these gaps, but newer studies indicate that autistic people often form satisfying relationships with other autistic people, which can enhance quality of life.

Children on the autism spectrum are more likely than their non-autistic peers to be involved in bullying, most often as victims. Among autistic people who seek friendships, reduced friendship quality and quantity are often associated with increased loneliness. Autistic people also face greater challenges in developing romantic relationships than non-autistic people.

Over time, many autistic people learn to observe and form models of social patterns, and develop coping strategies, such as "masking". Masking is associated with poorer mental health outcomes as well as delayed diagnosis, which can limit access to appropriate supports.

=== Restricted and repetitive behaviors ===
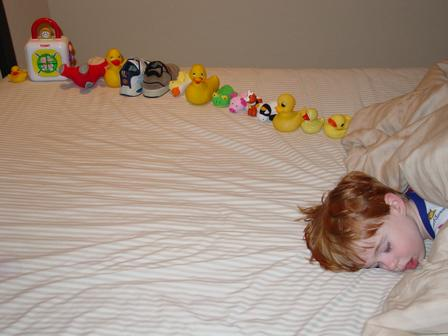
A young autistic boy who has arranged his toys in a row

The second core feature of autism is a pattern of restricted and repetitive behaviors, activities, and interests. To be diagnosed with autism under the DSM-5-TR, a person must exhibit at least two of the following behaviors: repetitive behaviors, resistance to change, focused interests, and sensory reactivity.

It is increasingly argued that these characteristics should be accepted, which is supported by their recognized functions, such as self-regulation. Focused interests can also provide personal fulfillment and contribute to the development of specialized knowledge. A distinction should be made between these features and those of obsessive–compulsive disorder, which can co-occur with autism and involve compulsions or obsessions aimed at preventing feared outcomes.

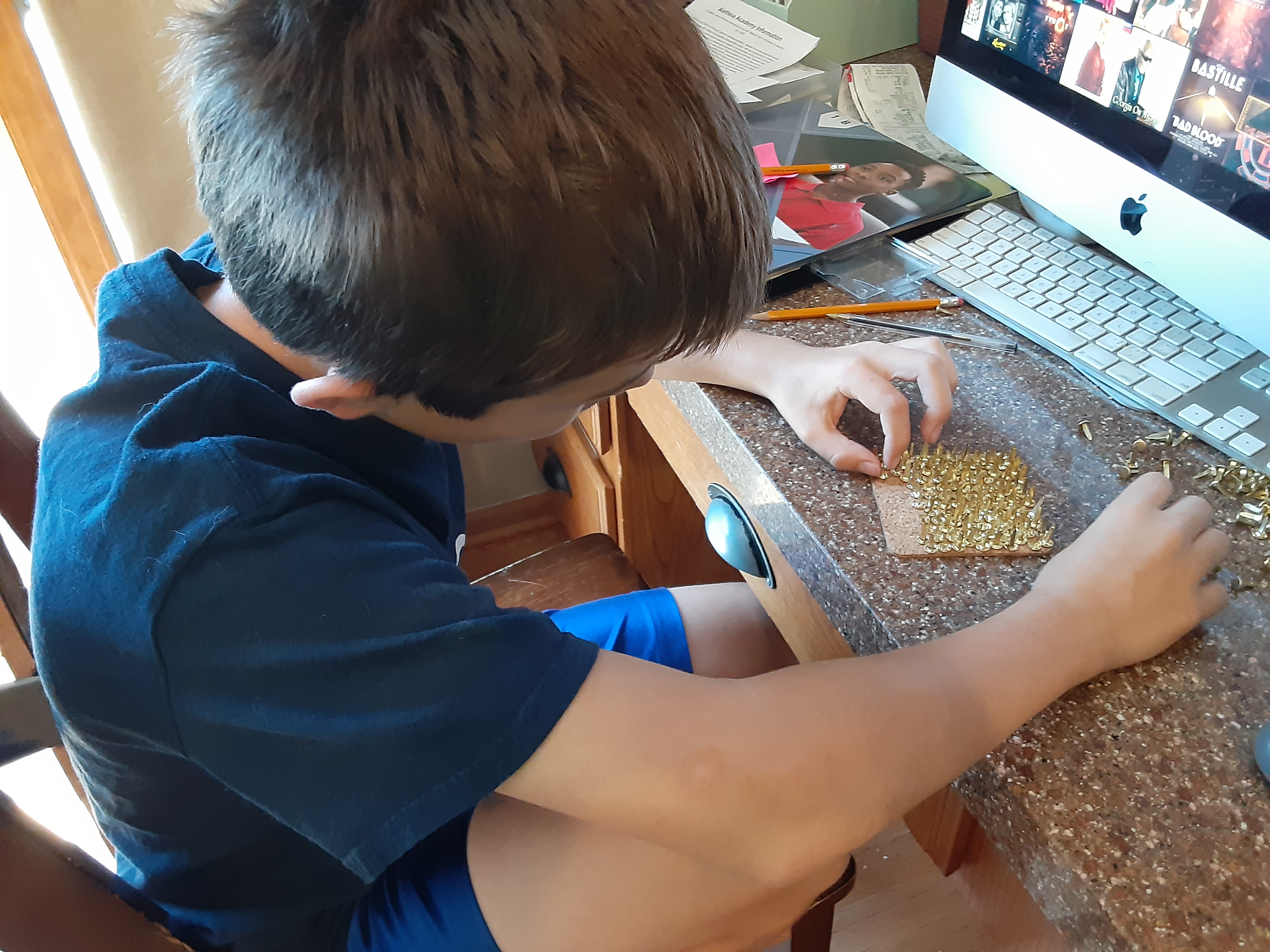
An autistic boy arranging brads on a cork coaster

==== Repetitive behaviors ====
Repetitive behaviors found in autism include rocking, hand flapping, finger flicking, head banging, and repeating phrases or sounds (including echolalia). These behaviors may occur consistently or primarily when the person is stressed, anxious, or upset. They are also known as stimming. Other examples include playing with toys in ways others might consider limited or unusual (e.g., arranging toys in a row).

In adults with autism, stimming is also used as a coping mechanism. Many adults learn to suppress (or "mask") these behaviors, which can increase their stress and anxiety.

==== Resistance to change ====
Autistic people may have a strong preference for routine, such as performing daily tasks in a specific order or showing distress in response to changes others may consider minor. They may become distressed if their routine changes or is disrupted.

==== Focused interests ====
Autistic people may have an intense interest in a particular activity, topic, or hobby, often accompanied by sustained attention and deep knowledge; for example, a strong attachment to certain objects or frequent discussion of a certain topic.

==== Sensory reactivity ====
Atypical responses may arise in autistic people in response to certain sensory input, such as aversion to specific sounds or textures, fascination with lights or movement, or apparent indifference to pain or temperature. This is experienced by 90% of autistic people. They can be hyperactive or hypoactive in response to sensory input. Some underreact to pain and temperature while others have a stronger reaction to it.

=== Self-injury ===
Self-harm occurs about three times more often in autistic people than in non-autistic people. Behaviors can include head-banging, hand-biting, and skin-picking, and can lead to serious injury or, in rare cases, death. Several explanations have been proposed for the development and persistence of self-harm among people with developmental conditions such as autism. Communication difficulties may lead some autistic people to use self-injury to express needs, distress, or other feelings. Self-harm may also help regulate sensory input or modulate pain perception, particularly for those with chronic discomfort or medical conditions. Neurological factors are also under investigation, with atypical basal ganglia connectivity suggested as a potential biological predisposition in some autistic people.

=== Wandering (elopement) ===
Some autistic people "wander" off—a behavior known as elopement—and put themselves in danger. About half of families with autistic children report elopement. The propensity for elopement increases with the severity of the autism. Siblings unaffected by autism show much lower rates of elopement. Drowning, a leading cause of death for autistic children, and traffic injuries are among the dangers associated with elopement.

=== Fatigue, burnout, inertia, meltdown, shutdown ===
Several non-diagnostic models have been used to describe challenges that autistic people face in their daily lives. These concepts lack formal clinical criteria but are widely described by autistic people themselves.

Autistic burnout or fatigue is a prolonged state of mental and physical exhaustion. It is described as distinct from but similar to occupational burnout and is often linked to the pressure to hide autistic traits in social interactions. The term "autistic burnout" was first used in 2008, with research into the phenomenon undertaken in the 2020s. Several researchers have proposed characterizations of autistic burnout, but no consensus definition exists. Depression can be misattributed to autistic burnout, as they have several overlapping criteria. Reported coping strategies include reduced masking, increased stimming, engaging in special interests and familiar activities, and seeking stress relief. Some affected people temporarily withdraw from social contact as a recovery strategy; while providing relief, interpersonal withdrawal can also result in loneliness and worsening mental health. There is limited data on professional interventions.

Autistic inertia is a difficulty experienced among autistic people with initiating, transitioning between, or stopping activities or mental states. It may manifest as a feeling of being "stuck": people find it challenging to begin a task, shift focus to a different activity, or disengage from an action, even when they want to.

A meltdown may occur if, upon processing large amounts of information, an autistic person experiences anxiety or feels overwhelmed. Triggers may be sensory or social, and often include unpredictability, unmet basic needs, and emotional situations, which tend to accumulate. A meltdown can be expressed audibly (e.g., screaming or crying) or physically. The person often shows signs of distress beforehand, such as pacing, finger flicking, hand flapping, making noises, rocking back and forth, asking repetitive questions, trembling, or sweating. An autistic shutdown is similar, but inward; the person is often unable to speak or withdraws completely. Meltdowns or shutdowns may be prevented by eliminating the distressing factors. They may be ameliorated by avoiding further questions or pressure, showing the person that one is there to help, and allowing the person to calm down by leaving the situation or breathing slowly.

=== Cognitive profile ===
Autistic people often show an uneven or "spiky" cognitive profile, with relative strengths in some cognitive domains alongside difficulties in others. The otherwise rare savant syndrome, characterized by an isolated skill in a narrow area, is more common among autistic people, but studies of its prevalence have found different results. These special skills are related to prodigious memory. Most common are splinter skills, such as memorization of sports trivia or historical facts. Research has also reported enhanced performance by autistic participants on certain perceptual and attentional tasks.

=== Other features ===
Autistic people may exhibit traits or characteristics that are not part of the formal diagnostic criteria but can nonetheless affect their personal well-being or family dynamics.

- An estimated 60–90% of autistic people have motor signs that include poor muscle tone, poor motor planning, and toe walking; difficulties in motor coordination appear common across the autism spectrum.
- Unusual or atypical eating behavior occurs in about 70% of children on the autism spectrum, to the extent that it was once considered a diagnostic indicator. Selectivity is the most common characteristic, although eating rituals and food refusal are also reported.
- Several studies report moderate correlations between autism, Internet addiction disorder, and video game addiction.

== Causes ==
The exact causes of autism are unknown, with genetics likely being the largest contributing factor. It was long presumed a single cause at the genetic, cognitive, and neural levels underpinned the social and non-social features, but autism is increasingly thought to be a complex condition with distinct, often co-occurring, causes for its core aspects. It is unlikely that autism has a single cause; research has identified many factors as potential contributors, including genetics, prenatal and perinatal (shortly after birth) history, neuroanatomical anomalies, changing social demands in the workplace or in school, and environmental influences. Changing social demands in education and the workplace may also exacerbate adaptive difficulties, leading to higher rates of diagnosis. It is possible to identify general factors but difficult to determine specific ones. Research into causes is complex due to challenges in identifying distinct biological subgroups in the autistic population.

=== Genetics ===
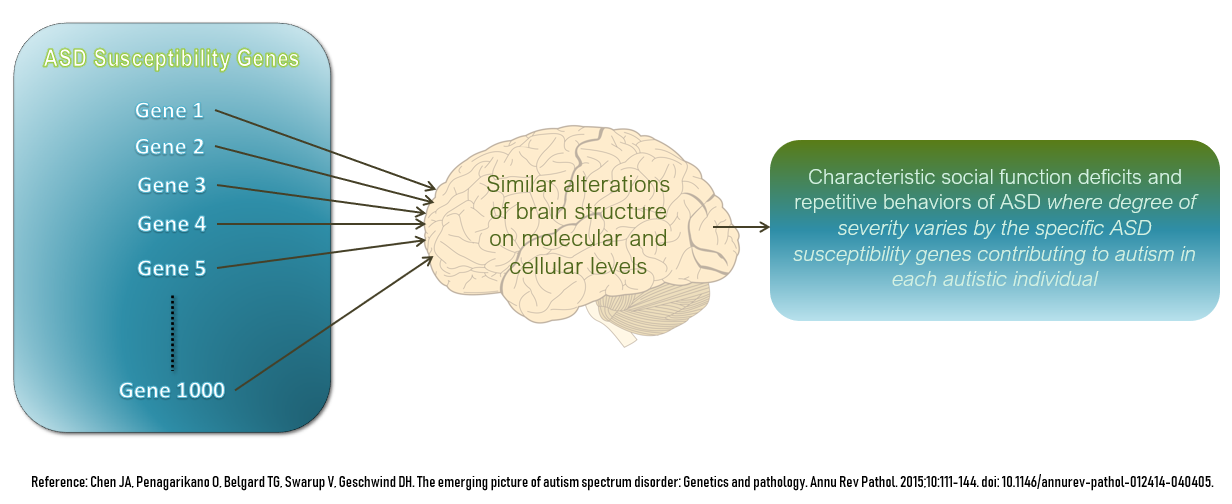
Hundreds of different genes are implicated in the likelihood of being autistic, most of which influence the brain structure in a similar way.

Autism has a strong genetic basis, but the genetics of autism are complex and it is unclear whether autism is explained more by rare mutations with major effects or by rare multi-gene interactions of common genetic variants. Twin studies indicate that autism is highly heritable, with genetic factors explaining most of the risk and shared environmental effects playing a minor role. Numerous genes have been found to be associated with autism, with most loci individually explaining less than 1% of autism cases and having only small effects. While these genetic variants are associated with a higher likelihood of being autistic, they do not individually determine whether someone will be autistic. Complexity arises from interactions among multiple genes, the environment, and heritable epigenetic factors (which influence gene expression without changing DNA sequence).

Typically, autism is not traceable to a single-gene (Mendelian) mutation or chromosome anomaly, and no known genetic syndrome selectively causes autism. If autism is one characteristic of a broader medical condition, such as fragile X syndrome, it is called syndromic autism, as opposed to non-syndromic or idiopathic autism, which is typically polygenic without a known cause. Syndromic autism is present in approximately 25% of autistic people. Research has suggested that autistic people with intellectual disability tend to have rarer, more impactful, genetic mutations than those found in people diagnosed solely with autism. A number of genetic syndromes causing intellectual disability may also co-occur with autism, including fragile X, Down, Prader–Willi, Angelman, Williams syndrome, and SYNGAP1-related intellectual disability.

Research suggests that autism is associated with genes that influence neural development and connectivity. These are involved in key neuronal processes such as protein synthesis, synaptic activity, cell adhesion, and the formation and remodeling of synapses, as well as the regulation of excitatory and inhibitory neurotransmission. Studies have identified lower expression of genes linked to the inhibitory neurotransmitter gamma-aminobutyric acid, alongside higher expression of genes associated with glial (e.g., astrocytes) and immune (e.g., microglia) cells, correlating with higher numbers of these cells in post-mortem brain tissue. Genes associated with variation in the mTOR signaling pathway, which is involved in cell growth and survival, are also under investigation. Some hypotheses in evolutionary psychiatry suggest that autism-associated genes may persist because of proposed links to traits such as intelligence, systematizing abilities, or innovation.

If parents have one autistic child, the chance of having a second autistic child ranges from 7% to 20%. Though autism is highly heritable, many autistic people have only non-autistic family members. In some cases, this may be explained by de novo structural variations—such as deletions, duplications, or inversions—that arise spontaneously during meiosis and are not present in the parents' genomes. The likelihood of being autistic is greater with older fathers than with older mothers; two potential explanations are the known increase in the number of mutations in older sperm and the hypothesis that men marry later if they carry a genetic predisposition and show some signs of autism.

=== Evolutionary perspectives ===
Research on the evolutionary advantages of autism and associated genes has suggested that autistic people may have contributed uniquely to human development, particularly in technological innovation (such as tool-making) and in detailed observation and analysis of the natural environment. Systematic reviews emphasize that these ideas remain speculative and that no single evolutionary explanation has been established.

=== Social factors ===
Social factors such as upbringing are not known to cause autism, but it is possible that increasing demands for flexibility and social interaction in education, or in one's personal and professional life, may cause people to exhibit pronounced difficulties that would not have led to diagnosis in a different setting.

A 2010 study of California health records found that children living near another child recently diagnosed with autism were more likely to also be diagnosed, an effect the authors attributed to social diffusion of information about autism rather than a true rise in underlying prevalence; they estimated this accounted for about 16% of the increase in diagnosed prevalence between 2000 and 2005.

=== Neurocognitive theories ===
Various theoretical frameworks attempt to integrate underlying genetic and environmental causes with observed neurobiological findings and behavioral traits.

- The Intense World Theory proposes that a higher neural responsiveness in autism leads to more intense sensory perception, attention, memory, and emotional responses, shaping the person's experience.
- The Enhanced Perceptual Functioning model of autism posits that superior and more independent functioning of auditory and visual perception is the root cause of the specific pattern of cognitive, behavioral, and neural performance observed in autistic people. The model asserts the importance of perception, arguing it is more central to the autistic phenotype than social or higher-order cognitive processes.

Beyond models of causation and brain function, cognitive theories have been developed to explain patterns of information processing common in autistic people, to better understand the autistic phenotype. While these cognitive accounts describe how autistic traits may manifest, they are generally viewed as explanations of the behavioral and cognitive consequences of the underlying neurobiological development rather than primary causes themselves.

- The weak central coherence theory suggests a tendency to focus on details over broader context.
- The empathising–systemising theory posits that autistic people have distinct cognitive styles related to analyzing systems versus empathizing with others.

=== Early life and prenatal or perinatal factors ===
Certain factors during pregnancy and birth may increase the likelihood of autism, although no single factor is conclusive and study results are often inconsistent. These factors include advanced parental age, maternal health conditions (e.g., gestational diabetes, infections such as rubella, inflammation), exposure to certain medications, and some environmental exposures like significant air pollution during pregnancy. While many environmental factors have been investigated, few have established links, and some prominent claims (e.g., vaccines or parenting styles) have been disproven.

==== Disproven refrigerator mother hypothesis ====
Work on autism in the mid-20th century proposed the "frigid mother" or refrigerator mother hypothesis, according to which poor parenting or lack of emotional support from parents leads to autism. When it was proposed, the hypothesis contributed to considerable media attention about autism, which had previously been mostly ignored. The hypothesis has since fallen out of favor, and has not garnered support when studied. But the blame placed on parents of children on the autism spectrum, especially mothers, has contributed to substantial stigma.

Early social experiences, such as caregiver interactions or deprivation, may shape the development of autism, potentially via gene–environment correlations, and are distinct from the discredited refrigerator mother hypothesis.

==== Disproven vaccines hypothesis ====
Parents may first become aware of autistic characteristics in their child around the time of a routine vaccination. This has led to theories – subsequently disproven – blaming vaccine "overload", the vaccine preservative thiomersal, or the MMR vaccine for causing autism. In 1998, British physician Andrew Wakefield led a fraudulent, litigation-funded study that suggested that the MMR vaccine may cause autism. His co-authors have since recanted the claims made in the study. Wakefield was struck off the British medical register for "serious professional misconduct" after determination that his involvement in the study amounted to fraud, leading to the loss of his right to practice medicine.

Two versions of the vaccine causation hypothesis were that autism results from brain damage caused by either the MMR vaccine itself, or by mercury used as a vaccine preservative. No convincing scientific evidence supports these claims. They are biologically implausible, and further evidence continues to refute them, including the observation that the rate of autism continues to climb despite elimination of thimerosal from most routine vaccines given to children from birth to 6 years of age.

A 2014 meta-analysis examined ten major studies on autism and vaccines involving 1.25 million children worldwide; it concluded that neither the vaccine preservative thimerosal (mercury), nor the MMR vaccine, which has never contained thimerosal, lead to autism. Despite this, misplaced parental concern has led to lower rates of childhood immunizations, outbreaks of previously controlled childhood diseases in some countries, and the preventable deaths of several children.

In 2005, Sanofi Pasteur's Tripedia DTaP vaccine automatically included autism on a long list of "adverse events" due to unverified reports by consumers, although such reports did not "establish a causal relationship" to the vaccine at any point. Anti-vaccine activists have spread false claims about the absence of autism in North America's Amish population due to lower vaccination rates. A 2010 study revealed that autism is present in 1 out of every 271 Amish children.

== Mechanism ==
The mechanisms of autism are the molecular and cellular processes believed to cause or contribute to the symptoms of autism. Multiple processes are hypothesized to explain different autistic features. These hypotheses include defects in synapse structure and function, reduced synaptic plasticity, disrupted neural circuit function, gut–brain axis dyshomeostasis, neuroinflammation, and altered brain structure or connectivity. Autism symptoms stem from maturation-related changes in brain systems. The mechanisms of autism are divided into two main areas: pathophysiology of brain structures and processes, and neuropsychological linkages between brain structures and behaviours, with multiple pathophysiologies linked to various autism behaviours.

Evidence suggests gut–brain axis abnormalities may contribute to autism. Studies propose that immune, gastrointestinal inflammation, autonomic nervous system dysfunction, gut microbiota alterations, and dietary metabolites may contribute to brain neuroinflammation and dysfunction. Additionally, enteric nervous system abnormalities could play a role in neurological disorders by allowing disease pathways from the gut to impact the brain.

Synaptic dysfunction also appears to be implicated in autism, with some mutations disrupting synaptic pathways involving cell adhesion. Evidence points to teratogens affecting the early developmental stages, suggesting autism arises very early, possibly within the first eight weeks after conception.

Neuroanatomical studies support that autism may involve abnormal neuronal growth and pruning, leading to brain enlargement in some areas and reduction in others. Functional neuroimaging studies show reduced activation in somatosensory cortices during theory of mind tasks in autistic individuals and highlight potential imbalances in neurotransmitters like glutamate and γ-aminobutyric acid that may underlie autism's behavioural manifestations.

== Diagnosis ==
=== Classification ===
The DSM-5 and ICD-11 are the two main frameworks for classification of mental disorders in use today. Autism spectrum disorder is classified in both as a neurodevelopmental disorder, with its definition encompassing a spectrum of highly varied presentations. The term "spectrum" indicates multifaceted variation rather than a simple range from mild to severe. Before the DSM-5 (2013) and ICD-11/ICD-11 CDDR (2019/2024), autism fell within a broader pervasive developmental disorder category that included labels such as Asperger syndrome and classic autism (also called childhood autism or Kanner syndrome). Because these diagnoses overlapped, the manuals unified them under "autism spectrum disorder" (ASD).

Since 1980, the committees behind both manuals have aimed for greater convergence, incorporating biological research while keeping behavior-based criteria. ICD-11 instead records whether the person has co-occurring intellectual disability or language impairment.

Some researchers have questioned whether existing criteria capture the full phenomenon, prompting proposals for prototype descriptions, transdiagnostic biological markers, or distinctions between common behavioral traits and rarer genetic or environmental factors. Others have proposed alternatives to the disorder-focused spectrum model that deconstruct autism into separate phenomena: a non-pathological spectrum of behavioral traits in the general population, and rare genetic mutations or environmental factors influencing neurodevelopmental and psychological conditions.

==== DSM ====
The American Psychiatric Association's Diagnostic and Statistical Manual of Mental Disorders, Fifth Edition, Text Revision (DSM-5-TR), released in 2022, is the latest version. Its fifth edition—DSM-5, released in 2013—was the first to define ASD as a single diagnosis, combining the previously distinct diagnoses of classic autism, Asperger syndrome, childhood disintegrative disorder, and pervasive developmental disorder not otherwise specified (PDD-NOS). This is still the case in the DSM-5-TR.

The DSM-5 and DSM-5-TR adopt a dimensional approach, with one diagnostic category for disorders that fall under the autism spectrum umbrella. Within that category, the DSM-5 has a framework that differentiates individuals by dimensions of symptom severity and by associated features (i.e., the presence of other conditions or factors that may contribute to the symptoms, other neurodevelopmental or mental conditions, intellectual disability, or language impairment). The two core symptom domains are (a) social communication and (b) restricted, repetitive behaviors. Clinicians may specify separate severity levels for each domain based on the degree to which symptoms affect daily functioning, rather than providing a single overall severity rating.

Before the fifth edition, the DSM separated social deficits and communication deficits into two domains. The DSM-5 also revised the onset criteria to specify that symptoms appear in the early developmental period, noting that symptoms may manifest later when social demands exceed capabilities; the previous edition had required onset before age three. These revisions remain in the DSM-5-TR.

==== ICD ====
The World Health Organization's International Classification of Diseases (11th revision), ICD-11, was released in 2018 and came into full effect in 2022. Its classification of autism spectrum disorder (6A02) is based on whether intellectual impairment is present as well as the level, if any, of language impairment, as follows:

ICD-11 classification of autism spectrum disorder
	with mild or no impairment of functional language	with impaired functional language	with complete, or almost complete, absence of functional language
without Disorder of Intellectual Development	6A02.0	6A02.3	
with Disorder of Intellectual Development	6A02.1	6A02.4	6A02.5

== Screening ==
About half of parents of children with ASD notice their child's atypical behaviors by age 18 months, and about four-fifths notice by age 24 months. If a child does not meet any of the following milestones, it "is an absolute indication to proceed with further evaluations. Delay in referral for such testing may delay early diagnosis and treatment and affect the [child's] long-term outcome."

- No response to name (or gazing with direct eye contact) by 6 months.
- No babbling by 12 months.
- No gesturing (pointing, waving, etc.) by 12 months.
- No single words by 16 months.
- No two-word (spontaneous, not just echolalic) phrases by 24 months.
- Loss of any language or social skills, at any age.

The Japanese practice is to screen all children for ASD at 18 and 24 months, using autism-specific formal screening tests. In contrast, in the UK, children whose families or doctors recognize possible signs of autism are screened. It is not known which approach is more effective. The UK National Screening Committee does not recommend universal ASD screening in young children. Their main concerns includes higher chances of misdiagnosis at younger ages and lack of evidence of effectiveness of early interventions. There is no consensus between professional and expert bodies in the US on screening for autism in children younger than 3 years.

Screening tools include the Modified Checklist for Autism in Toddlers (M-CHAT), the Early Screening of Autistic Traits Questionnaire, and the First Year Inventory; initial data on M-CHAT and its predecessor, the Checklist for Autism in Toddlers (CHAT), on children aged 18–30 months suggests that it is best used in a clinical setting and that it has low sensitivity (many false-negatives) but good specificity (few false-positives). It may be more accurate to precede these tests with a broadband screener that does not distinguish ASD from other developmental disorders. Screening tools designed for one culture's norms for behaviors like eye contact may be inappropriate for a different culture. Although genetic screening for autism is generally still impractical, it can be considered in some cases, such as children with neurological symptoms and dysmorphic features.

== Management ==
There is no cure for autism. From the perspective of neurodiversity, "curing" or otherwise treating autism may not be an appropriate goal.

Interventions targeting specific challenges or co-occurring conditions associated with autism are widely regarded as important. Perspectives on the goals of these interventions vary: the medical model of disability often focuses on addressing core characteristics such as social communication difficulties and restricted/repetitive behaviors. The neurodiversity movement supports interventions aimed at enhancing functional communication (spoken or non-spoken), managing related issues like anxiety or inertia, or addressing behaviors considered harmful, rather than seeking to alter core autistic features.

Studies of interventions have methodological problems that prevent definitive conclusions about efficacy, but the development of evidence-based interventions has advanced. Several therapies can help autistic children, and they are typically tailored to the child's needs. The main goals of therapy are to lessen associated difficulties and family distress, and to increase quality of life and functional independence. In general, higher IQs correlate with higher responsiveness to interventions and larger intervention outcomes. Behavioral, psychological, educational, and skill-building interventions may be used to help autistic people learn skills for living independently, as well as other social, communication, and language skills. Therapy also aims to reduce behaviors perceived as inappropriate and to build upon strengths. Medications have not been found to reduce autism's core features, but may be used for associated difficulties, such as irritability or inattention.

=== Non-pharmacological interventions ===
Certain interventions, such as intensive, sustained special education, remedial education programs, and behavior therapy, are considered beneficial early in life for autistic children to acquire self-care, social, and job skills. Available approaches include applied behavior analysis, developmental models, structured teaching, speech and language therapy, cognitive behavioral therapy, social skills therapy, and occupational therapy. These interventions may either target autistic features comprehensively or focus on a specific area of difficulty. Recent research further suggests that mindfulness-based stress reduction can reduce behavioral difficulties, alleviate psychological distress, and enhance cognitive and social functioning in people with autism, while also significantly reducing their caregivers' stress, anxiety, and depression.

==== Applied behavior analysis ====
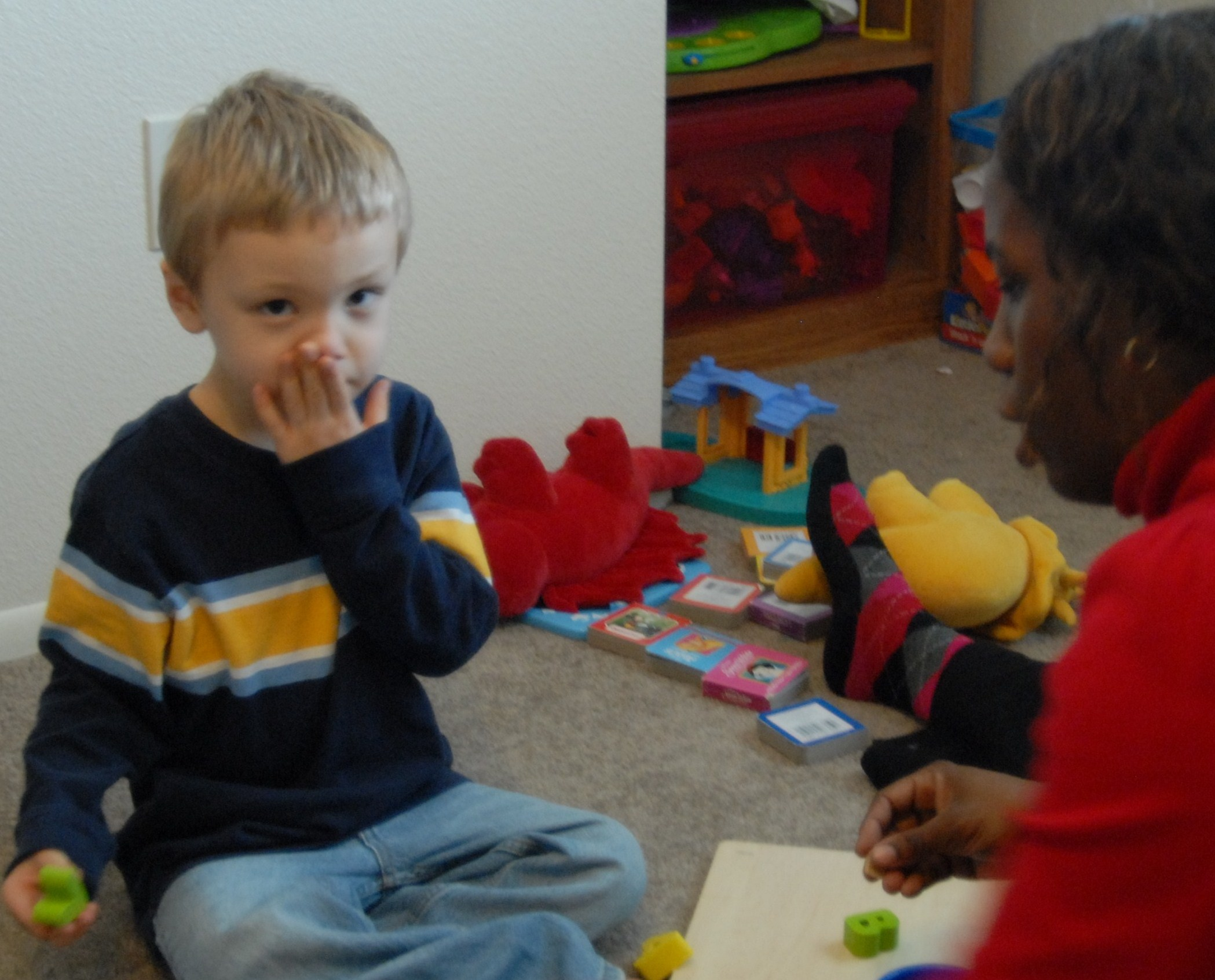
An autistic boy works with a behavioral therapist to identify different letters of the alphabet as part of a language therapy program.

Applied behavior analysis (ABA) is a behavioral therapy that aims to teach autistic children social and other behaviors by prompting and rewarding desired responses, a technique known as positive reinforcement. This may include learning fine and gross motor and language skills through play, expressive labeling, and requesting. It also seeks to reduce aggressive and self-injurious behavior by assessing its environmental causes and reinforcing replacement behaviors. Early, intensive ABA therapy has been claimed to demonstrate effectiveness in enhancing preschool children's language skills, adaptive functioning, and intellectual performance. Another review reported a lack of adverse event monitoring, although such adverse effects may be common.

Interventions for early childhood may be based on different theoretical frameworks, such as ABA (with its structured and naturalistic approaches) and Developmental Social Pragmatic (DSP) models. Research suggests that children who already understand more spoken language (receptive language) tend to make progress with fewer hours of a flexible, play-based style of ABA—as few as 2.5 to 20 hours per week. Children who understand less spoken language tend to undergo more repetitive, structured style called discrete trial training, delivered more intensively (around 25 hours per week), to make similar progress.

ABA has faced criticism. Sandoval-Norton et al. describe it as unethical and argue that it has unintended consequences, such as prompt dependency, susceptibility to psychological abuse, and overemphasis on compliance, which can create challenges in the transition to adulthood. Increasingly, ABA is also criticized for trying to reduce or eliminate autistic behaviors to make children appear less autistic, rather than respecting neurodiversity. A problem with unreported conflicts of interest in ABA research has been described, with potential effects on the quality of evidence. In response, some ABA advocates and practitioners suggest that instead of discontinuing the therapy, efforts should focus on increasing protections and ethical compliance.

A related type of intervention is parent training models. These teach parents to implement various ABA and DSP techniques themselves. Several parent-mediated behavioral therapies target social communication difficulties, while their effect on restricted and repetitive behaviors (RRBs) is uncertain. Similarly, teacher-implemented interventions that combine naturalistic ABA with a developmental social pragmatic approach have been associated with effects on young children's social-communication behaviors, although there is limited evidence regarding effects on broader autistic characteristics.

=== Inclusion in education and the workplace ===
Inclusive education models strive to support autistic students in mainstream educational settings, moving away from segregated special education environments toward participation alongside their peers. Despite these efforts, autistic students can face significant barriers, sometimes leading to trauma or emotionally-based school non-attendance. This avoidance is often rooted in overwhelming sensory environments, social anxiety, communication breakdowns, bullying, or lack of adequate support and understanding, rather than defiance.

Central to successful inclusion is the application of frameworks like Universal Design for Learning (UDL), which proactively designs curricula and learning environments to be accessible and engaging for all students, including those who are autistic. UDL principles accommodate varied learning styles, sensory sensitivities, and communication preferences often present in autistic people.

The SPACE framework (sensory, predictability, acceptance, communication, empathy) developed by Doherty et al., primarily for healthcare settings, offers a lens for identifying and addressing common environmental barriers that can contribute to distress and avoidance behaviors for autistic people. Accommodations may include providing quiet spaces as a retreat for people feeling overwhelmed. Autistic students may also need help initiating and maintaining social relationships with their peers if they wish to do so. Especially in higher education, some autistic students may need help with executive functioning, e.g., managing their own work, and the ability to initiate and complete tasks.

Transitioning to adulthood, autistic people often encounter substantial barriers to securing and maintaining meaningful employment, leading to high rates of unemployment and underemployment compared to the general population. Challenges can include navigating traditional interview processes, difficulties with unspoken social rules in the workplace, sensory sensitivities to office environments (e.g., lighting, noise), and needs for clear, direct communication and structured tasks. Effective workplace inclusion involves implementing reasonable adjustments such as flexible working hours or locations, providing noise-canceling headphones, staff training, and mentorship programs. Working from home can help to avoid overwhelming sensory or social situations, even if this means losing desirable social contact. Autism-friendly workplaces not only allow autistic employees to utilize their unique skills and perspectives but also benefit employers through increased innovation, problem-solving capabilities, and employee loyalty.

=== Pharmacological interventions ===
Autistic people may be prescribed medication to manage specific co-occurring conditions or behaviors, such as ADHD, anxiety, aggression, or self-injurious behaviors, particularly when non-pharmacological interventions alone have been insufficient. Medications are not routinely recommended for autism's core features, such as social and communication difficulties or restricted and repetitive behaviors.

More than half of autistic children in the United States are prescribed psychoactive drugs or anticonvulsants. Commonly used drug classes include antidepressants, stimulants, and antipsychotics. Among antipsychotics, risperidone and aripiprazole are the only medications approved by the U.S. Food and Drug Administration specifically for reducing irritability, aggression, and self-injurious behaviors in autistic people. These drugs can have significant side effects and responses to them may vary. The UK's National Health Service cautions against the overprescription of antipsychotics and recommends their use only for specific indications, at the lowest effective dose and for the shortest duration necessary.

Some research suggests that risperidone and aripiprazole may also reduce restricted and repetitive behaviors, such as hand-flapping or body-rocking. The evidence supporting this use has limitations, including study size and scope, alongside concerns about adverse effects. A meta-analysis found no significant efficacy of these antipsychotics or SSRI antidepressants in reducing these behaviors. Stimulant medications like methylphenidate may reduce inattention or hyperactivity in some autistic children, particularly when ADHD is also present. But methylphenidate's efficacy is lower in autistic people with ADHD compared to non-autistic people with ADHD, and side effects are more common.

=== Alternative medicine ===
Alternative therapies have been researched and implemented, and many have resulted in harm to autistic people. For example, chelation therapy is not recommended as a treatment for autism, with risks outweighing potential benefits. Reports of death from botched chelation therapy as treatment for autism have been documented. Medical authorities have condemned bleach-based approaches, such as chlorine dioxide solutions marketed as Miracle Mineral Solution, as dangerous and ineffective. The British NHS also warns against CEASE therapy, which rejects vaccinations and recommends potentially harmful amounts of dietary supplements. There is also no evidence for the efficacy of hyperbaric oxygen therapy and its use is not recommended.

Although sometimes used for autistic people, no reliable evidence indicates a gluten- and casein-free diet as a standard intervention. Autistic children's preference for unconventional foods as well as gastrointestinal problems and lack of exercise can lead to reduction in bone cortical thickness, and this risk is greater in those on casein-free diets, as a consequence of the low intake of calcium and vitamin D.

=== Emerging evidence-based interventions ===
Interventions for autistic adults have limited evidence; cognitive behavioral approaches and mindfulness are considered promising. Music therapy for autistic people likely improves overall autism severity, global functioning, and quality of life, but evidence is unclear for social and communication skills. Animal-assisted activities and therapies show promise in improving social communication, irritability, hyperactivity, and word usage in autistic people.

=== Caregivers ===
Families who care for an autistic child often experience greater stress. Parents often face substantial barriers when seeking an autism diagnosis and appropriate care for their child, including long waits, financial strain, and inconsistent guidance from healthcare providers. Affiliate stigma can also reduce quality of life, where negative attitudes toward the autistic child are extended to those close to them. Family members who are themselves autistic may be better able to understand the autistic child.

== Prognosis ==
The prognosis after diagnosis of autism in childhood is poorly understood. Some core diagnostic symptoms, including restricted and repetitive behaviors, are stable, but some gradual symptom changes occur. Among children diagnosed before age 6, about 9 in 10 continue to meet diagnostic criteria one year later. Some report that those with limited support needs are likely to have lessened autistic features over time, while others argue that this perception is likely due to masking—hiding autistic characteristics to avoid stigma. Long-term outcomes vary, in part due to variability in presentation between individuals and across affected domains. Autistic adults are more likely to be unemployed and have greater mental health service needs than the general population. About 85% of autistic people need support with independent living in adulthood. Factors such as developing spoken language before age six, having an IQ above 50, and possessing marketable skills are associated with higher likelihood of independent living in adulthood. Mortality among autistic people is approximately twice that of the general population, particularly among those with co-occurring neurologic or psychiatric disorders.

=== Suicide ===
Risk factors for self-harm and suicidality include circumstances that could affect anyone but are more common among autistic people, such as mental health problems (e.g., anxiety disorder) and social problems (e.g., unemployment and social isolation). In addition, there are autism-specific factors, such as exhausting attempts to behave like a non-autistic person to avoid stigma and negative reactions of society towards autistic people (masking). Autistic people are also at significantly increased risk of victimization, including bullying, sexual assault, and other forms of criminal abuse. A 2019 meta-analysis found autistic people to be four times more likely to have depression than non-autistic people.

Rates of suicidality vary significantly depending upon what is being measured. This is partly because questionnaires developed for non-autistic subjects are not always valid for autistic people. As of 2023, the Suicidal Behaviours Questionnaire–Autism Spectrum Conditions (SBQ-ASC) is the only test validated for autistic people. According to some estimates, about a quarter of autistic youth and a third of all autistic people have experienced suicidal ideation at some point. Autistic people are about three times as likely as non-autistic people to make a suicide attempt. Almost 10% of autistic youth and 15% to 25% of autistic adults have attempted suicide. Rates of suicide attempts and suicidal ideation are the same for people formally diagnosed with autism and people who have typical intelligence and are believed to be autistic but have not been diagnosed. The suicide risk is higher for autistic people who are not cisgender males and do not have intellectual disabilities.

== Epidemiology ==
Most professionals believe that race, ethnicity, and socioeconomic background have limited effect on the occurrence of autism.

A 2011 study presented at the Cognitive Science Society's annual meeting reported that autistic participants were more likely to be non-theistic or non-religious than non-autistic participants.

=== Co-occurring conditions ===
Euler diagram showing overlapping clinical phenotypes in genes associated with monogenic forms of autism, dystonia, epilepsy and schizophrenia: Genes associated with epilepsy Genes associated with schizophrenia Genes associated with autism Genes associated with dystonia

Several conditions can co-occur with autism at a higher rate than in the rest of the population. This may be referred to as comorbidity, and may increase with age, causing difficulties for youth on the autism spectrum, and can make interventions and therapies more challenging. Features of autism and other diagnoses often overlap, and autism's characteristics can make traditional diagnostic procedures more difficult. This is sometimes known as diagnostic overshadowing. Common co-occurring conditions are:

- ADHD is seen in between 25% to 32% of autistic people. Characteristics similar to those of ADHD can be part of an autism diagnosis.
- Epilepsy occurs in about 10% of autistic people. The risk is higher for older autistic people and those with intellectual disability.
- Intellectual disabilities are some of the most common co-occurring conditions with autism (30% to 40%). As autism diagnosis is increasingly given to people with lower support needs, there is a tendency for the proportion with co-occurring intellectual disability to decrease over time.
- Various anxiety disorders can co-occur with autism, with overall co-occurring rates of 17% to 23%. Many anxiety disorders have characteristics better explained by autism itself, or are hard to distinguish from autism's features.
- Rates of co-occurring depression in autistic people range from 9% to 13%.
- Obsessive–compulsive disorder (OCD) occurs in 7% to 10% of autistic people.
- Starting in adolescence, some autistic people fall under the criteria for the similar-looking schizoid personality disorder, which is characterized by a lack of interest in social relationships, a tendency toward a solitary or sheltered lifestyle, secretiveness, emotional coldness, detachment, and apathy.
- Genetic conditions: About 10% of autistic people are diagnosed with a rare genetic syndrome such as Prader–Willi, Angelman, Fragile X, or 16p11.2 deletion syndrome.
- Gastrointestinal problems are among the most commonly reported co-occurring medical conditions in autistic people, and occur at higher rates than in the general population. Frequently reported issues include chronic constipation, diarrhea, abdominal pain, gastroesophageal reflux, and functional gastrointestinal disorders. Gastrointestinal symptoms in autistic people have been associated with increased irritability, distress, sleep disturbances, and challenges in communication, particularly in children who have limited spoken language. The underlying mechanisms are not fully understood and are likely multifactorial, involving interactions between diet, gut motility, sensory sensitivities, stress responses, and the gut-brain axis.
- Sleep problems affect about two-thirds of autistic people at some point in childhood. These most commonly include symptoms of insomnia, such as difficulty falling asleep, frequent nocturnal awakenings, and early-morning awakenings. Sleep problems are associated with difficult behaviors and family stress, and are often a focus of clinical attention over and above the autism diagnosis.
- Motor difficulties, including developmental coordination disorder are highly prevalent in autistic people despite rarely receiving a formal diagnosis
- There is a significantly higher rate of joint hypermobility/hypermobility spectrum disorders/Ehlers–Danlos syndrome in autistic people.
- There is tentative evidence that gender dysphoria occurs more frequently in autistic people.

=== Prevalence ===
The World Health Organization notes that reports on prevalence vary widely. It estimates that about 1 in 127 children were autistic between 2012 and 2021 with a trend of increasing prevalence over time. This may reflect an underestimate of prevalence in low- and middle-income countries. Surveillance studies in community samples of adults suggest a similar share of the adult population would meet diagnostic criteria if formally assessed. The number of people diagnosed has increased since the 1990s, likely due to a combination of increased recognition of autism, better availability of diagnosis, and changes to the diagnostic criteria. The increase in autism is largely attributable to changes in diagnostic practices, referral patterns, availability of services, age at diagnosis, and public awareness, particularly among women, though other unidentified environmental factors may exist.

The Centers for Disease Control's Autism and Developmental Disabilities Monitoring Network reported that approximately 1 in 31 children in the United States is diagnosed with autism, based on data collected in 2022. For 2016 data, the estimate was 1 in 54, compared to 1 in 68 in 2010 and 1 in 150 in 2000. Diagnostic criteria for autism have changed significantly since the 1980s; for example, U.S. special-education autism classification was introduced in 1994.

=== Sex ratio ===
Males are about three times more likely to be diagnosed with autism than females. Several theories about the higher prevalence in males have been investigated. Prevalence differences may be mainly due to a result of differences in expression of characteristics between males and females, with autistic women and girls showing less atypical behaviors and therefore being less likely to be diagnosed with autism.

=== Sexuality and gender identity ===
The common belief that most autistic people are not interested in sexual or romantic relationships, which largely formed due to older studies with poor methodology, has been refuted by more recent studies. However, both autistic men and autistic women are more likely to be asexual than their non-autistic counterparts.

Research indicates that autistic people are significantly more likely to be LGBTQ than the general population. More specifically, studies show they are less likely to be heterosexual and more likely to be transgender or gender-nonconforming, with gender dysphoria also being more common. One study from 2018 found about 70% of its autistic participants identified as non-heterosexual compared to only about 30% of the non-autistic group. The range of sexual orientations among autistic people has also been found to be more diverse than among non-autistic people.

== History ==
The history of autism encompasses various conceptual and treatment approaches, with the understanding of autism having been shaped by cultural, scientific, and societal factors. Pathologized or viewed as beneficial as part of neurodiversity, autism has been subject to various treatments (e.g. electroconvulsive therapy) Progress in scientific understanding of autism has contributed to both treatment and perceptions of autism.

=== Etymology ===
In 1911, Swiss psychiatrist Paul Eugen Bleuler coined the German term Autismus to characterize the social withdrawal he observed in people with schizophrenia. Rendered in English as autism, the term derives from the Greek word autos ("self"). Bleuler used the term for a symptom of adult schizophrenia: a person's retreat from reality into their own subjective world. He also mentioned "autistic thinking" as a fleeting, illogical thought process everyone experiences.

In the mid-1920s, German psychiatrist Fritz Künkel categorized over 100 schizophrenic patients into four groups, one of which he labeled "autistic", highlighting disturbances in emotional life. In 1926, building on his work and Bleuler's, Grunya Sukhareva published an article about six boys who were musically gifted and had a tendency toward abstract thinking. She called their affects "flattened" and their tendency to avoid other children an "autistic attitude". Scholars have credited Sukhareva with making observations that closely mirror ASD as described by the DSM-5 and ICD-11. Her work expanded on the definition throughout her career while making great strides in differentiating ASD and schizophrenia nearly 30 years before the establishment of separate classifications for these diagnoses with the 1980 publication of the DSM-III.

== Society and culture ==
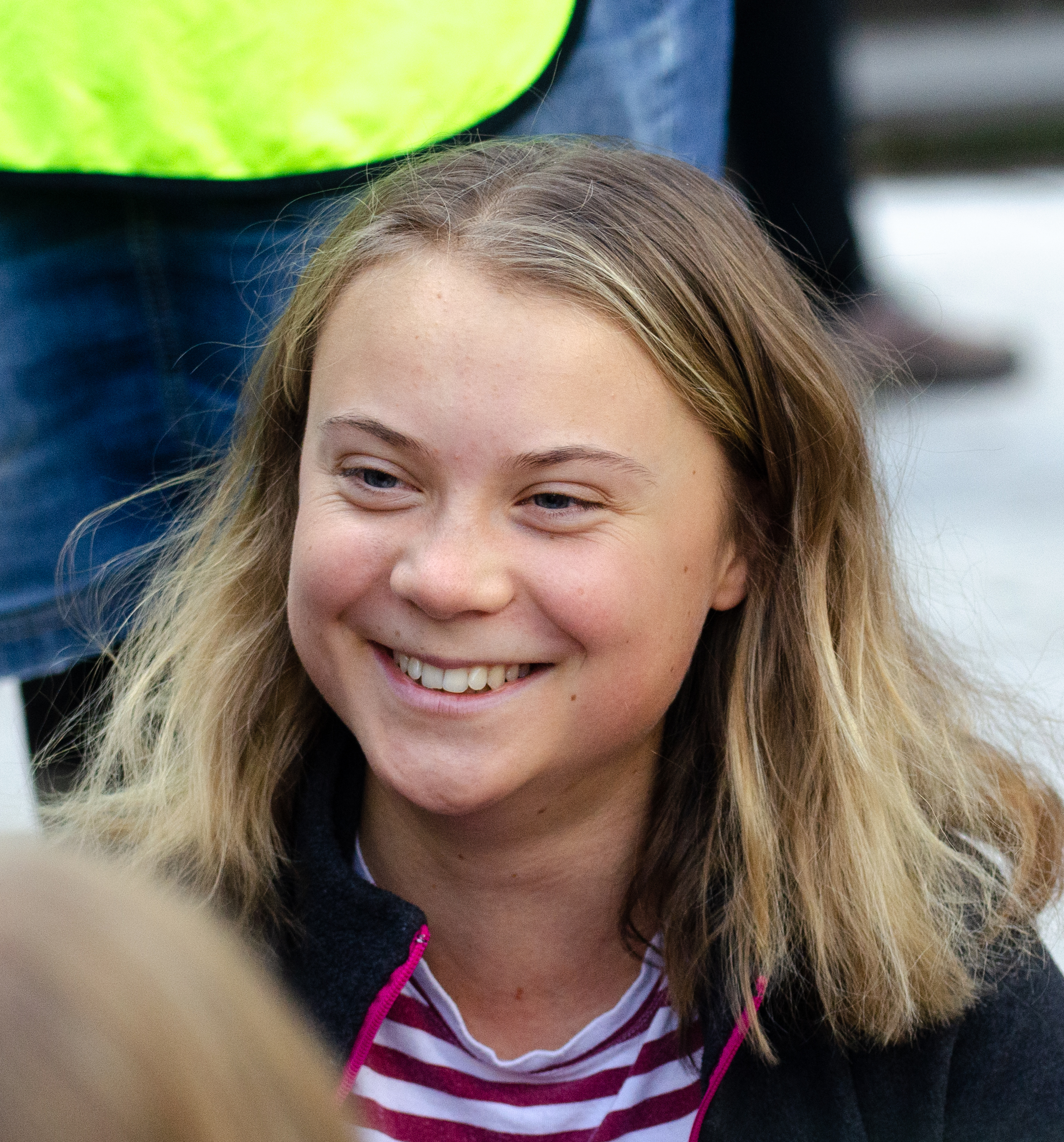
In 2021, Swedish climate activist Greta Thunberg likened her autism to a "superpower", crediting her success to her focused interests.

The autistic rights and neurodiversity movements argue autism should be accepted as a difference to be accommodated instead of cured, although a minority of autistic people might still accept a cure. Social-science scholars study autistic people in hopes of learning more about "autism as a culture, transcultural comparisons ... and research on social movements". Events related to autism include World Autism Awareness Day, Autism Sunday, Autistic Pride Day, Autreat, and others.

Focused interests are commonly found in autistic people and can include activism. Environmental activist Greta Thunberg has spoken favorably about her autism diagnosis, saying that autism can be a source of life purpose, as well as the basis of careers, hobbies, and friendships. Entrepreneur and co-founder of Microsoft Bill Gates has written, "If I were growing up today, I probably would be diagnosed on the autism spectrum."

=== Legal implications of diagnosis ===
In Sweden, people with an autism diagnosis are required to provide additional proof of suitability to apply for a driver's license and may face barriers to entering military service.

In the United Kingdom, an autistic police officer was rejected from firearms training, which a tribunal later ruled was illegal discrimination.

In the United States, autism is generally a "disqualifying condition" for joining the military, but autistic people can apply for a medical waiver.

=== Discrimination ===
Discrimination against autistic people occurs in various forms, both directly and indirectly, in a variety of settings, professional, educational, or clinical. Such discrimination is often initiated after other people identify the autistic person as different from themselves, which may occur quickly. This discrimination sometimes leads to violence, assault, or social exclusion. Various legal limitations on people with an autism diagnosis have also been considered discriminatory.

=== Neurodiversity movement ===
Flag representing the autistic rights movement. The color scheme is influenced by the pride flag, but missing the color blue, as specific campaigns using the color have been denounced by the autism community. The middle band is inspired by the elemental symbol of gold (Au). The infinity sign is a symbol long used in the wider autism and neurodiversity movement.

Some autistic people and affiliated researchers have advocated a shift in attitudes toward the view that autism is a difference, rather than a disease that ought to be treated or cured. Critics have bemoaned the entrenchment of some of these groups' opinions, and that they speak to a select group of autistic people with limited difficulties. Clinical and policy guidance in Australia, the United States, and the United Kingdom now promote neurodiversity-affirming language—for example, using "characteristics" instead of "symptoms" and avoiding words such as "cure".

The neurodiversity movement and the autism rights movement are social movements within the context of disability rights, emphasizing the concept of neurodiversity, according to which autism is a result of healthy and valuable variations in the human brain rather than a disorder to be cured. The autism rights movement advocates including greater acceptance of autistic behaviors, therapies that focus on coping skills rather than imitating the behaviors of non-autistic people, and the recognition of the autistic community as a minority group. Autism rights or neurodiversity advocates believe the autism spectrum is genetic and should be accepted as a healthy variation in the human genome. A common argument against neurodiversity activists is that most have relatively few support needs or are self-diagnosed, and do not represent the views of autistic people with more support needs. It has been argued that only autistic people with lower support needs should be included under the neurodiversity banner, as autism with high support needs "may rightfully be viewed as a disability". The concept of neurodiversity is contentious in autism advocacy and research groups and has led to infighting.

=== Driving ===
Many autistic teenagers and adults struggle to learn to drive a car. By age 21, about 20% of autistic people in the US have a driver's license, compared to more than 60% of non-autistic people. They are less likely to start learning, likely to do it later than non-autistic peers, and less likely to proceed to the next stage.

The differences are due to the characteristics of autism such as being slower to recognize pedestrians, having a slower reaction time, worse executive function, worse motor coordination, and poorer situational awareness (e.g., remembering that another vehicle is in their blind spot). Autistic drivers report difficulty with motor control, sensory processing (e.g., the glare of oncoming headlights), visual-motor coordination, mental inflexibility (e.g., failing to yield the right of way), and difficulty with social cues (e.g., understanding how to communicate and cooperate with other drivers to navigate a road hazard).

Although these problems mean that most autistic people do not learn how to drive, those autistic people who have earned driver's licenses have about the same chance as anyone else of being involved in a traffic collision and a lower risk of some problems, including driving at an unsafe speed or having their license suspended.

=== Parental reactions to a child's diagnosis ===
Parents' reactions to having their children diagnosed with autism vary. Many experience grief. A study in Spain found that children diagnosed with autism and their parents faced stigma and societal challenges. Stigma is created by societal standards that influence how parents think of autism. Cultural values can influence how a parent feels; many feel defeated because they think they failed as a parent. Spain has early intervention programs to help parents adapt to their children's diagnoses. Stigma causes many parents to hide their children's condition, so their experiences are minimized or denied.

=== Diagnosis in adulthood ===
Since the 1990s, the number of people without co-occurring intellectual disability who are diagnosed with autism (including Asperger's syndrome and ASD) has increased. Some autistic adults of average or above-average intelligence were not diagnosed in childhood because the condition was less well-understood. Diagnosis in adulthood can have effects very different from those experienced by people diagnosed in childhood. A late diagnosis produces an emotional reaction and a phase of readjustment. Late-diagnosed adults often report a history of being treated for anxiety and depression. Many report lifelong feelings of isolation and alienation. After a period of readjustment, a late diagnosis is often viewed favorably, allowing previously unidentified needs to be met and support and accommodations to be requested.

== See also ==
- Intellectual giftedness – Intellectual ability significantly higher than average
- Animal model of autism – Approach to study autism using non-human species
- Autism and memory
- Autism-friendly – Being aware of factors affecting autistic people
- Autism in popular culture
- Autism in psychoanalysis
- Autistic art – Autistic artists' works capturing autistic experiences
- Controversies in autism – Controversies about both the causes and diagnoses of autism
- Diagnostic substitution
- Global perceptions of autism – Global variation of autism diagnoses, treatments, and experiences
- List of autistic fictional characters
- List of films about autism
- Outline of autism – Overview of and topical guide to autism
- Twice exceptional – Term used for a gifted student who also possesses at least one disability
- Violence and autism – Sociocultural issue involving autism
