= Developmental social-pragmatic model =

Type of developmental intervention

The developmental social-pragmatic model (DSP) is a developmental intervention that focuses on initiation and spontaneity in communication and following the child's focus of attention and motivations. Developmental interventions focus on a child's ability to form positive, meaningful relationships with other people when these are hampered by autism spectrum disorders such as autism or Asperger syndrome, or developmental disorders. It aims to build on the child's current communicative repertoire, even if this is unconventional; and using more natural activities and events as contexts to support the development of the child's communicative abilities.

== Overview ==
The DSP approach is characterized by the parent or therapist allowing the child to initiate interactions as they are based on the child's interests. The environment is also organized in a way to encourage interactions. This can be done by:

- Obstruction (briefly interrupting an activity in a playful way)
- Sabotage (e.g. leaving out a required item needed for an activity)
- Disrupting routines (changing the way a child normally does things)
- Inaccessible items (the child will need the parents help to access an out-of-reach item).

Children on the autistic spectrum typically have trouble picking up the emotional states of others so emotions are exaggerated by the adult. These are often accompanied by verbal labeling; e.g., "See how happy I am!"

Other strategies in the developmental social-pragmatic model include:

- Focus on spontaneous social communication within a flexible structure and varied activities
- Using a range of methods such as speech, song and gestures as communication strategies
- Intervention is child-focused in terms of control, turn taking, and reciprocity
- Meaningful activities or events are chosen for their interest and motivation to the child
- A variety of social groupings used to build skills for complex social experiences
- Supports such as visual and gesture cues help the child make sense of activities and interactions
- Emotional expression and affect sharing are seen as central to the interactive and learning process.

DSP put emphasis on developing communication skills within the context of developing relationships and socio-emotional growth, whereas the role of emotions in motivation and learning is minimized in behavioral interventions.

== Research into DSP ==
Parents of autistic children using developmental or 'naturalistic' techniques were reported to be happier, less stressed and felt they communicated better with their child than parents trained in discrete trial training (Koegel et al., 1996). Research indicates that DSP can lay some claim to being an evidence-based treatment. A review of the literature on DSP found that it appeared to be more effective than discrete trial training (Delprato 2001). DSP can improve adult-child interactions (Mahoney & Perales 2003), but little of the research on DSP to date has been rigorous.
