= Joyce McDougall =

NZ–French psychoanalyst

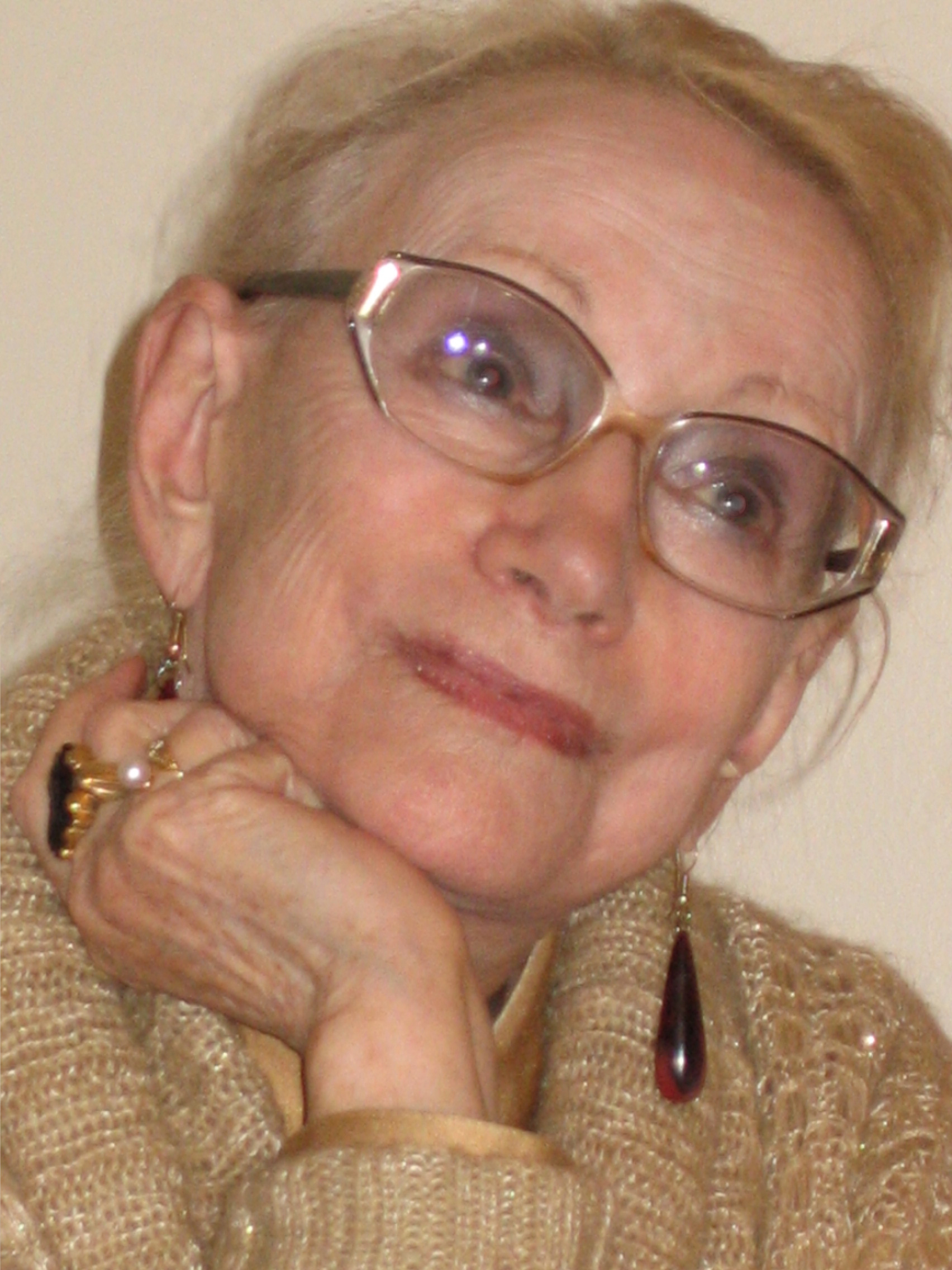

Joyce McDougall (/məkˈduːɡəl/ mək-DOO-gəl; 26 April 1920 in Dunedin – 24 August 2011 in London) was a New Zealand-French psychoanalyst.

McDougall wrote four major books in the field of psychoanalysis: Plea for a Measure of Abnormality (1978), Theatre of the Mind: Illusion and Truth On the Psychoanalytical Stage (1982), Theatres of the Body: A Psychoanalytic Approach to Psychosomatic Illness (1989), and The Many Faces of Eros (1996).

== See also ==
- Disaffectation
