= Alexithymia =

Deficiency in understanding, processing, or describing emotions

- Other names: Emotional blindness
- Pronunciation: /əˌlɛksɪˈθaɪmiə/; ə-LEK-sih-THY-mee-ə
- Specialty: Clinical psychology, psychiatry
- Frequency: 5% generally, but several times higher in some conditions

Alexithymia (/əˌlɛksɪˈθaɪmiə/, ə-LEK-sih-THY-mee-ə), also called emotional blindness, is a neuropsychological phenomenon characterized by difficulties processing or describing one's emotions.

Alexithymia occurs in 5% of the general population, though it is more common for those with conditions such as autism (50%), post-traumatic stress disorder (PTSD; 42%), and cancer (37%).

It is often associated with difficulties in attachment and interpersonal relations.

== Etymology ==
The term alexithymia was introduced by psychotherapists John Case Nemiah and Peter Sifneos in 1970 to describe a particular psychological phenomenon. The word is formed by combining the alpha privative prefix ἀ- (a-, meaning 'not') with λέξις (léxis, referring to 'words') and θῡμός (thȳmós, denoting 'disposition,' 'feeling,' or 'rage') in a way that is like "dyslexia".

In its literal sense, alexithymia signifies the "inability to describe feelings correctly". People who exhibit alexithymic traits or characteristics are commonly referred to as alexithymics or alexithymiacs.

== Classification ==
As of 2025, scholars have not reached a consensus about the classification of alexithymia. Both the DSM-5 and the ICD-11 classify alexithymia as neither a symptom nor a mental disorder. Cognitive behavioral and psychoanalytic theorists have proposed conceptualizations, including categorical signs and symptoms of alexithymia.

=== Cognitive behavioral model ===
The cognitive behavioral model, also known as the attention-appraisal model, proposes three components:

1. difficulty identifying one's own feelings (DIF)
2. difficulty describing one's own feelings (DDF)
3. externally oriented thinking (EOT) characterized by a tendency to not focus attention on emotions.

=== Psychoanalytic model ===
The psychoanalytic model suggests four components:

1. difficulty identifying one's own feelings (DIF)
2. difficulty describing one's own feelings (DDF)
3. externally oriented thinking (EOT)
4. constricted imaginal processes (IMP) characterized by infrequent daydreaming.

In the psychoanalytic model, constricted imaginal processes (the lack of spontaneous imagining) does not correlate with other components of alexithymia. Such findings have led to an ongoing debate in the field about whether IMP is a component of alexithymia.Whereas psychoanalytic formulations tend to continue to place importance on IMP, the attention-appraisal model (presently the most widely used cognitive-behavioral model of alexithymia) excludes IMP from the construct. In practice, since the constricted imaginal processes items were removed from earlier versions of the TAS-20 in the 1990s, the most used alexithymia assessment tools (and consequently most alexithymia research studies) have only assessed the construct in terms of DIF, DDF, and EOT.

In terms of the relevance of alexithymic deficits for the processing of both negative emotions and positive emotions (eg. happiness or sadness), the Perth Alexithymia Questionnaire (PAQ) was the only alexithymia measure that enables valence-specific assessments of alexithymia across both negative and positive emotions according to a report published in 2023. As of 2023, the PAQ has highlighted that alexithymic deficits in emotion processing often do extend across both negative and positive emotions, although people typically report more difficulties for negative emotions. Such findings of valence-specific effects in alexithymia are also supported by brain imaging studies.

Studies (using measures of alexithymia assessing DIF, DDF, and EOT) have reported that the prevalence rate of high alexithymia is less than 10% of the population. A less common finding suggests that there may be a higher prevalence of alexithymia amongst males than females, which may be accounted for by difficulties some males have with "describing feelings", but not by difficulties in "identifying feelings", in which males and females show similar abilities. Work with the PAQ has suggested that the alexithymia construct manifests similarly across different cultural groups and ages (i.e., it has the same structure and components).

Psychologist R. Michael Bagby and psychiatrist Graeme J. Taylor have argued that the alexithymia construct is inversely related to the concepts of psychological mindedness and emotional intelligence and there is "strong empirical support for alexithymia being a stable personality trait rather than just a consequence of psychological distress".

Difficulty in recognizing and discussing emotions may manifest at subclinical levels in men who conform to specific cultural norms of masculinity, such as the belief that sadness is a feminine emotion. This condition, known as normative male alexithymia, can be present regardless of sex.

== Assessment ==
Alexithymia is most commonly assessed using self-report questionnaires, such as the Perth Alexithymia Questionnaire (PAQ) or the 20-item Toronto Alexithymia Scale (TAS-20). These tools assess the DIF, DDF, and EOT components of alexithymia. Studies that have directly compared these measures have consistently found the PAQ to be the best performing psychometrically, with strong evidence for it providing a comprehensive and reliable alexithymia profile. The PAQ is therefore often regarded as the contemporary gold standard alexithymia assessment tool. For example, the PAQ is the only alexithymia measure that has been successfully validated for use with autistic people. The TAS-20, introduced in 1994, is still a widely used measure for alexithymia. However, studies after 1994 have highlighted a number of validity and reliability concerns with the TAS-20, such as parts of the measure having low reliability, and parts being confounded by how distressed respondents currently are (i.e., measuring distress rather than alexithymia).

Several observer-rated or interview-based measures of alexithymia also exist, but to date, they have been rarely used in research or clinical settings due to long administration times.

== Signs and symptoms ==
Typical signs include problems identifying, processing, describing, and working with one's own feelings, often marked by:

- a lack of understanding of the feelings of others
- having difficulty distinguishing between feelings and the bodily sensations of emotional arousal
- confusion of physical sensations often associated with emotions
- concrete, realistic, logical thinking, often to the exclusion of emotional responses to problems.

Some alexithymic individuals may appear to contradict the above-mentioned characteristics because they can experience chronic dysphoria or manifest outbursts of crying or rage. However, questioning usually reveals that they are quite incapable of describing their feelings or appear confused by questions inquiring about the specific feeling.

According to Henry Krystal, individuals exhibiting alexithymia think in an operative way and may appear to be super-adjusted to reality. However, in psychotherapy, a cognitive disturbance becomes apparent as patients tend to recount trivial, chronologically ordered actions, reactions, and events of daily life with monotonous detail. In general, these individuals can, but not always, seem oriented toward things and even treat themselves as robots. These problems seriously limit their responsiveness to psychoanalytic psychotherapy; psychosomatic illness or substance abuse is frequently exacerbated should these individuals enter psychotherapy.

A common misconception about alexithymia is that affected individuals are totally unable to express emotions verbally and that they may even fail to acknowledge that they experience emotions. Even before coining the term, Sifneos (1967) noted patients often mentioned things like anxiety or depression. The distinguishing factor was their inability to elaborate beyond a few limited adjectives such as "happy" or "unhappy" when describing these feelings. The core issue is that people with alexithymia have poorly differentiated emotions, limiting their ability to distinguish and describe them to others. This contributes to the sense of emotional detachment from themselves and difficulty connecting with others, making alexithymia negatively associated with life satisfaction even when depression and other confounding factors are controlled for.

=== Associated conditions ===
Alexithymia frequently co-occurs with other disorders. Research indicates that alexithymia overlaps with 50% to 80% of the autistic population, and there is also overlap with sleep disorders, with more overlapping conditions described further below.

In a 2004 study that used the TAS-20, 85% of the adults with ASD fell into the "impaired" category and almost half fell into the "severely impaired" category; in contrast, among the adult control population only 17% were "impaired", and none were "severely impaired". Fitzgerald & Bellgrove pointed out that, "Like alexithymia, Asperger's syndrome is also characterised by core disturbances in speech and language and social relationships". (Note: Note that, Asperger's syndrome has been merged with other conditions into autism spectrum disorder (ASD) and is no longer a diagnosis in the WHO's ICD-11 or the APA's DSM-5-TR.) Hill & Berthoz agreed with Fitzgerald & Bellgrove (2006) and in response stated that "there is some form of overlap between alexithymia and ASDs". They also pointed to studies that revealed impaired theory of mind skill in alexithymia, neuroanatomical evidence pointing to a shared etiology, and similar social skills deficits. The exact nature of the overlap is uncertain. Alexithymic traits in AS may be linked to clinical depression or anxiety; the mediating factors are unknown and it is possible that alexithymia predisposes to anxiety. As an example of this, people with alexithymia are more likely to self-harm in a non-suicidal way. Alexithymia is considered to be a major contributor to autistic burnout, as it means that a person is unable to recognize early warning signs of exhaustion.

While the total alexithymia score as well as the difficulty in identifying feelings and externally oriented thinking factors are found to be significantly associated with ADHD, and while the total alexithymia score, the difficulty in identifying feelings, and the difficulty in describing feelings factors are also significantly associated with symptoms of hyperactivity and impulsivity, there is no significant relationship between alexithymia and inattentiveness.

There are many groups with high prevalence rates of alexithymia:

- Post-traumatic stress disorder (PTSD;42%), including 41% of US veterans of the Vietnam War with PTSD.
- Holocaust survivors with PTSD.
- Autism (50%).
- Cancer (37%).
- Schizophrenia (35%).
- Psoriasis (28%).
- Brain injury (15%).

People with Parkinson's disease or personality disorders experience greater than average symptoms of alexithymia.

Higher levels of alexithymia among mothers with interpersonal violence-related PTSD were found in one study to have proportionally less caregiving sensitivity. This latter study suggested that when treating adult PTSD patients who are parents, alexithymia should be assessed and addressed also with attention to the parent-child relationship and the child's social-emotional development. Specifically, the traits of alexithymia particularly overlap with the schizoid, avoidant, dependent and schizotypal personality disorders, substance use disorders, some anxiety disorders and sexual disorders as well as certain physical illnesses, such as hypertension, inflammatory bowel disease, diabetes, and functional dyspepsia. Alexithymia is further linked with disorders such as migraine headaches, lower back pain, irritable bowel syndrome, asthma, nausea, allergies and fibromyalgia.

People with alexithymia are likely to discharge tension coming from unpleasant emotional states through impulsive behaviors. Some of these include: binge eating, substance abuse, perverse sexual behavior or anorexia nervosa. The failure to regulate emotions cognitively might result in prolonged elevations of the autonomic nervous system (ANS) and neuroendocrine systems, which can lead to somatic diseases. People with alexithymia also show a limited ability to experience positive emotions leading Krystal and Sifneos (1987) to describe many of these individuals as anhedonic.

Alexisomia is a clinical concept that refers to the difficulty in the awareness and expression of somatic, or bodily, sensations. The concept was first proposed in 1979 by Yujiro Ikemi when he observed characteristics of both alexithymia and alexisomia in patients with psychosomatic diseases.

== Causes ==
It is unclear what causes alexithymia, though several theories have been proposed.

Early studies showed evidence that there may be an interhemispheric transfer deficit among people with alexithymia; that is, the emotional information from the right hemisphere of the brain is not being properly transferred to the language regions in the left hemisphere, as can be caused by a decreased corpus callosum. This is often present in psychiatric patients who have suffered severe childhood abuse. A neuropsychological study in 1997 indicated that alexithymia may be due to a disturbance to the right hemisphere of the brain, which is largely responsible for processing emotions. In addition, another neuropsychological model suggests that alexithymia may be related to a dysfunction of the anterior cingulate cortex. These studies have some shortcomings, however, and the empirical evidence about the neural mechanisms behind alexithymia remains inconclusive.

French psychoanalyst Joyce McDougall objected to the strong focus by clinicians on neurophysiological explanations at the expense of psychological ones for the genesis and operation of alexithymia, and introduced the alternative term "disaffectation" to stand for psychogenic alexithymia. For McDougall, the disaffected individual had at some point "experienced overwhelming emotion that threatened to attack their sense of integrity and identity", to which they applied psychological defenses to pulverize and eject all emotional representations from consciousness. McDougall has also noted that all infants are born unable to identify, organize, and speak about their emotional experiences (the word infans is from the Latin "not speaking"), and are "by reason of their immaturity inevitably alexithymic". Based on this fact McDougall proposed in 1985 that the alexithymic part of an adult personality could be "an extremely arrested and infantile psychic structure". A similar line of interpretation has been taken up using the methods of phenomenology. The first language of an infant consists of nonverbal facial expressions. The parent's emotional state is important for determining how any child might develop. Neglect or indifference to varying changes in a child's facial expressions without proper feedback can promote an invalidation of the facial expressions manifested by the child. The parent's ability to reflect self-awareness to the child is another important factor. If the adult is incapable of recognizing and distinguishing emotional expressions in the child, it can influence the child's capacity to understand emotional expressions.

The attention-appraisal model of alexithymia by Preece and colleagues describes the mechanisms behind alexithymia within a cognitive-behavioral framework. Within this model, it is specified that alexithymia levels are due to the developmental level of people's emotion schemas (those cognitive structures used to process emotions) and/or the extent to which people are avoiding their emotions as an emotion regulation strategy. There is a large body of evidence currently supporting the specifications of this model.

Molecular genetic research into alexithymia remains minimal, but promising candidates have been identified from studies examining connections between certain genes and alexithymia among those with psychiatric conditions as well as the general population. A study recruiting a test population of Japanese males found higher scores on the Toronto Alexithymia Scale among those with the 5-HTTLPR homozygous long (L) allele. The 5-HTTLPR region on the serotonin transporter gene influences the transcription of the serotonin transporter that removes serotonin from the synaptic cleft, and is well studied for its association with numerous psychiatric disorders. Another study examining the 5-HT_{1A} receptor, a receptor that binds serotonin, found higher levels of alexithymia among those with the G allele of the Rs6295 polymorphism within the HTR1A gene. Also, a study examining alexithymia in subjects with obsessive–compulsive disorder found higher alexithymia levels associated with the Val/Val allele of the Rs4680 polymorphism in the gene that encodes Catechol-O-methyltransferase (COMT), an enzyme that degrades catecholamine neurotransmitters such as dopamine. These links are tentative, and further research will be needed to clarify how these genes relate to the neurological anomalies found in the brains of people with alexithymia.

Although there is evidence for the role of environmental and neurological factors, the role and influence of genetic factors for developing alexithymia is still unclear. A single large scale Danish study suggested that genetic factors contributed noticeably to the development of alexithymia. However, some scholars find twin studies and the entire field of behavior genetics to be controversial. Those scholars raise concerns about the "equal environments assumption". Traumatic brain injury is also implicated in the development of alexithymia, and those with traumatic brain injury are six times more likely to exhibit alexithymia. Alexithymia is also associated with newborn circumcision trauma.

=== Substance abuse, or substance use disorders ===
There is evidence to propose a significant correlation between substance abuse and alexithymia and a meta-analysis found a large effect size between the two measures. A bi-directional relationship was suggested, where substance abuse increases alexithymic traits and alexithymia correlated with increased substance abuse. In a study that explored cocaine-dependent individuals, it was found that the mechanism between alexithymia and substance abuse may be mediated by differences in reward processing in alexithymic individuals although more research is needed.

== Relationships ==
Alexithymia can create interpersonal problems because these individuals tend to avoid emotionally close relationships, or if they do form relationships with others they usually position themselves as either dependent, dominant, or impersonal, "such that the relationship remains superficial". Inadequate "differentiation" between self and others by alexithymic individuals has also been observed. Their difficulty in processing interpersonal connections often develops where the person lacks a romantic partner.

In a study, a large group of alexithymic individuals completed the 64-item Inventory of Interpersonal Problems (IIP-64). The study found that "two interpersonal problems are significantly and stably related to alexithymia: cold/distant and non-assertive social functioning. All other IIP-64 subscales were not significantly related to alexithymia."

Chaotic interpersonal relations have also been observed by Sifneos. Due to the inherent difficulties identifying and describing emotional states in self and others, alexithymia also negatively affects relationship satisfaction between couples.

In a 2008 study alexithymia was found to be correlated with impaired understanding and demonstration of relational affection, and that this impairment contributes to poorer mental health, poorer relational well-being, and lowered relationship quality.

Some individuals working for organizations in which control of emotions is the norm might show alexithymic-like behavior but not be alexithymic. However, over time the lack of self-expressions can become routine and they may find it harder to identify with others.

== Treatment ==
Generally speaking, approaches to treating alexithymia are still in their infancy, with not many proven treatment options available.

In 2002, Kennedy and Franklin found that a skills-based intervention is an effective method for treating alexithymia. Kennedy and Franklin's treatment plan involved giving the participants a series of questionnaires, psychodynamic therapies, cognitive-behavioral and skills-based therapies, and experiential therapies. After treatment, they found that participants were generally less ambivalent about expressing their emotions and more attentive to their emotional states.

In 2017, based on their attention-appraisal model of alexithymia, Preece and colleagues recommended that alexithymia treatment should try to improve the developmental level of people's emotion schemas and reduce people's use of experiential avoidance of emotions as an emotion regulation strategy (i.e., the mechanisms hypothesized to underlie alexithymia difficulties in that model of alexithymia).

In 2018, Löf, Clinton, Kaldo, and Rydén found that mentalization-based treatment is also an effective method for treating alexithymia. Mentalization is the ability to understand the mental state of oneself or others that underlies overt behavior, and mentalization-based treatment helps patients separate their own thoughts and feelings from those around them. This treatment is relational, and it focuses on gaining a better understanding and use of mentalizing skills. The researchers found that all of the patients' symptoms including alexithymia significantly improved, and the treatment promoted affect tolerance and the ability to think flexibly while expressing intense affect rather than impulsive behavior.

Based on these findings, some therapists have begun to use awareness-of-sensation techniques such as Focusing to train alexithymic people in recognizing bodily sensations, connect them with descriptions and words for feelings, and create space for shifting these sensations.

A significant issue impacting alexithymia treatment is that alexithymia has comorbidity with other disorders. Mendelson's 1982 study showed that alexithymia frequently presented in people with undiagnosed chronic pain. Participants in Kennedy and Franklin's study all had anxiety disorders in conjunction with alexithymia, while those in Löf et al. were diagnosed with both alexithymia and borderline personality disorder. All these comorbidity issues complicate treatment because it is difficult to find people who exclusively have alexithymia.

== See also ==
- Antisocial personality disorder
- Emotional dysregulation
- Psychological mindedness
- Reduced affect display
- Somatization disorder
- Somatosensory amplification
