= Autistic art =

Autistic artists' works capturing autistic experiences

Autistic art is artwork created by autistic artists that captures or conveys a variety of autistic experiences. According to a 2021 article in Cognitive Processing, autistic artists with improved linguistic and communication skills often show a greater degree of originality and attention to detail than their neurotypical counterparts, with a positive correlation between artistic talent and high linguistic functioning. Autistic art is often considered outsider art. Art by autistic artists has long been shown in separate venues from artists without disabilities. The works of some autistic artists have featured in art publications and documentaries and been exhibited in mainstream galleries. Although autistic artists seldom received formal art education in the past, recent inclusivity initiatives have made it easier for autistic artists to get a formal college education. The Aspergers/Autism Network's AANE Artist Collaborative is an example of an art organization for autistic adults.

Many therapeutic, social, and interventional organizations today use art therapy to socialize and promote mental and emotional growth in autistic children.

== Overview ==
Many autistic art programs and projects are founded by nonprofit organizations, autistic artists, or other institutions to help autistic people express themselves and promote autistic art.

Sensory hypersensitivity may make an autistic person much more perceptive than a neurotypical person. The extreme attention to detail common in autistic people may manifest as talent in mathematics, art or other fields. Autistic persons who have talent in art are often outsiders in the art community. Unlike with common art, there is seldom any tradition or academic criteria in their creations. Each artist has their own personal style, that presents their conception of the autistic life experience.

== Art therapy ==
Art therapy is used as a therapeutic method primarily in autistic children, by itself or alongside methods such as applied behavior analysis. Proponents state it helps autistic children develop mental, social, and emotional maturity and teaches life skills. Advocates point out that art therapy can increase autistic tolerance to sensory stimuli and redirect self-stimulatory behavior "stims" into an activity less likely to distract other students. Artistic expression is a good alternative for nonverbal autistic children and those uncomfortable with verbal communication. Autistic people often have visual memory, so art therapy is a natural fit for autistic children who think in pictures instead of words.

== Benefits of art therapy in autistic children ==
Art therapy is used as a treatment to benefit patients dealing with problems from health issues to mental setbacks. Using creative thinking within art therapy and being able to express themselves in any way through their art helps autistic children with communication difficulties to better communicate with others. Children with autism tend to benefit from using art as a form of therapy, and art therapy is a tool that touches on many areas that are beneficial to these children.

== People ==
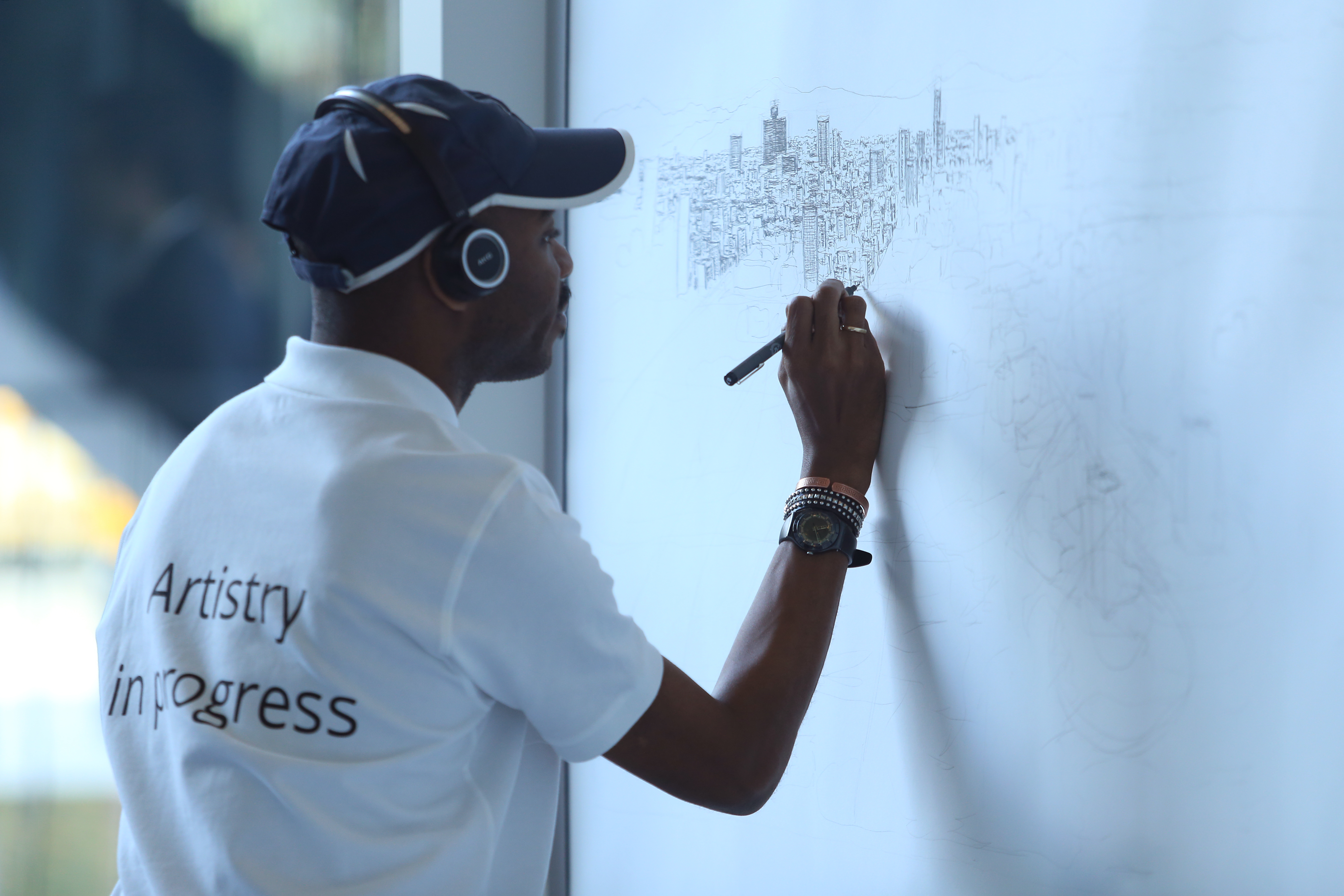
Stephen Wiltshire working in 2016

- Stephen Wiltshire (1974) – typically depicts cityscapes in his work. He is one of the most famous autistic artists and his art usually surrounds architectural features.
- Donna Williams (1963–2017) – focused on figurative works with an emphasis on movement.
- Larry Bissonnette (1957)
- Henriett Seth F. (1980) – creates abstract, highly patterned works.
- Gilles Tréhin (1972) – a self-taught artist who creates largely architectural drawings in pencil. Many of his sketches are of an imaginary world called Urville.
- George Widener (1962) – creates detailed imaginary worlds that are displayed in Ricco Maresca Gallery in New York, New York.
- Maxwell Atoms, American cartoonist, creator of The Grim Adventures of Billy & Mandy
- Richard Wawro (1952–2006)
- Jonathan Lerman (1987)
- Govy (1981–2023)
- Susan Te Kahurangi King (1951)
- Matthew Wong (1984–2019) – His work is characterised by his use of the colour blue and depictions of solitude.
- Ping Lian Yeak (1993) – Malaysian-Australian artist, described as a young autistic savant.
- Gregory Blackstock (1946–2023) – An American artist who created visual lists of categorized objects.

== Projects ==
=== Drawing Autism ===
Drawing Autism is a book collection of images and artwork created by people who are diagnosed with autism. This collection features creations of more than 50 autistic artists around the world and illustrates the potential for art of autistic persons as well as an insight into some of the characteristics of autism. The founder of the project is Jill Mullin, who is a board-certified behavior analyst. During her 15 years of experience working with autistic people, Mullin has found that many of them are talented in mathematics, science and art.

== See also ==
- Autistic rights movement
- Autism: The Musical, a 2007 documentary about autistic children writing and appearing in their own play
- Disability flag
- Life, Animated, a 2016 documentary featuring Disney fan art by autistic Owen Suskind
- Neurodiversity
- How to Dance in Ohio – 2023 Broadway musical based on the 2015 documentary film of the same name with actual autistic people playing autistic people
- The Curious Incident of the Dog in the Night-Time – both the book and the Tony Award-winning play adaptation also about a person with autism
