= Wynn Newhouse Award =

Award for disabled artists

- Description: Annual prize for disabled artists in recognition of artistic merit
- Country: United States
- Presented by: Samuel I. Newhouse Foundation
- Website: wnewhouseaward.com

The Wynn Newhouse Award is an annual prize given to disabled artists in recognition of their artistic merit.

== History ==
The Samuel I. Newhouse Foundation, a charitable organization founded by newspaper entrepreneur Samuel Irving Newhouse, Sr., inaugurated the award in 2006 at the suggestion of the late Wynn Newhouse, to draw attention to the contributions of artists with disabilities to contemporary art. Wynn Newhouse, himself disabled, was a prominent New York City art collector and grandson of the newspaper magnate.

== Recipients ==
Recipients share an annual award totaling $60,000, allocated by the judges. The selection committee changes each year. It is made up of four prominent members of the arts community including artists, curators and critics.

To be eligible for the Wynn Newhouse Awards, nominees must be artists of professional standing, and have a disability as recognized by the Americans with Disabilities Act of 1990. The awards are made in late December of each year.

In addition to the grants, many winning artists are offered an exhibition at the Palitz Gallery, a gallery space on East 61st Street in New York City. This exhibition is donated by Syracuse University in their Lubin Center in New York. An annual reception for winners attracts many persons in the arts community.

The Wynn Newhouse Awards are announced annually in December. They are currently coordinated by consultant Bill Butler of Alford, MA and by artist Gordon Sasaki of New York. Information can be obtained and artists can be suggested via the website wnewhouseawards.com

== Awards ==
Source: Wynn Newhouse

=== 2006 ===
- Riva Lehrer
- Terrence Karpowicz
- Jonathan Sarkin
- Darra Keeton
- Sunaura Taylor

=== 2007 ===
- Joseph Grigely
- Lihua Lei
- Harriet Sanderson
- Linda Sibio

=== 2008 ===
- Barbara Bloom
- Isabella Kirkland
- Stephen Lapthisophon
- Katie Miller

=== 2009 ===
- Tom Kovachevich
- Paul Laffoley
- Ralph Mindicino
- Edward Shalala

=== 2010 ===
- Willard Boepple
- Bill Shannon
- Tom Shannon
- Emily Eifler
- Emmet Estrada
- Doug Hilson
- Mamie Holst
- Ben Schonzeit

=== 2011 ===
- Barton Lidice Benes
- Mark Parsons
- Christine Sun Kim
- Sunaura Taylor
- Dawoud Bey
- John Fago
- Randy Gelber
- Corban Walker
- Peter Williams

=== 2012 ===
- Chuck Bowdish
- Laura Swanson
- Robin Antar
- Martin Cohen
- Laura Ferguson
- Alexis Mackenzie
- Katherine Sherwood
- Jennifer Lauren Smith

=== 2013 ===
- Carmen Papalia
- Kendrick Rusty Shackleford
- Ken Grimes
- Christopher Knowles
- Jason Lazarus

=== 2014 ===
- Park McArthur
- Carol Es
- Marlon Mullen
- George Widener
- Kerry Damianakes
- Willian Scott

=== 2015 ===
- Derrick Alexis Coard
- Courttney Cooper
- Nick Dupree
- Constantina Zavitsanos
- Dan Miller
- Carolyn Lazard
- Alice Sheppard

=== 2016 ===
- Cathy Weis
- Dustin Grella
- E. Jane
- Jason DaSilva
- Katya Tepper
- Laura Craig McNellis
- Melvin Way
- Monica Chulewicz

=== 2017 ===
- Amy Stacey Curtis
- BD White
- Beverly Baker
- Gregory Blackstock
- Helen Rae
- Myasia Dowdell
- Sky Cubacub
- Shannon Finnegan

=== 2018 ===
- Rachel Fein-Smolinski
- Emilie Gossiaux
- Kazumi Kamae
- Alma Leiva
- Jes Sachse
- Sandie Yi

=== 2019 ===
- Raquel Albarran
- Victorine Floyd Fludd
- Yo-Yo Lin
- Leroy Moore

=== 2020 ===
- Aurora Berger
- Robert Coombs (Artist)
- John Dugdale
- Kayla Hamiton
- Jerron Herman
- Michelle Miles
- Tony Pedemondt
