= Urville =

Urville may refer to:

Communes in France:

- Urville, Aube, in the Aube département
- Urville, Calvados, in the Calvados département
- Urville, Manche, in the Manche département
- Urville, Vosges, in the Vosges département
- Urville-Nacqueville, in the Manche département
- Urville (imaginary city) created by autistic savant Gilles Trehin

Other:

- Jules Dumont d'Urville was a French explorer
  - D'Urville Island, New Zealand, an island in New Zealand
  - Dumont d'Urville Station, a French research station in the Antarctic
