= Frank Moore (performance artist) =

American performance artist

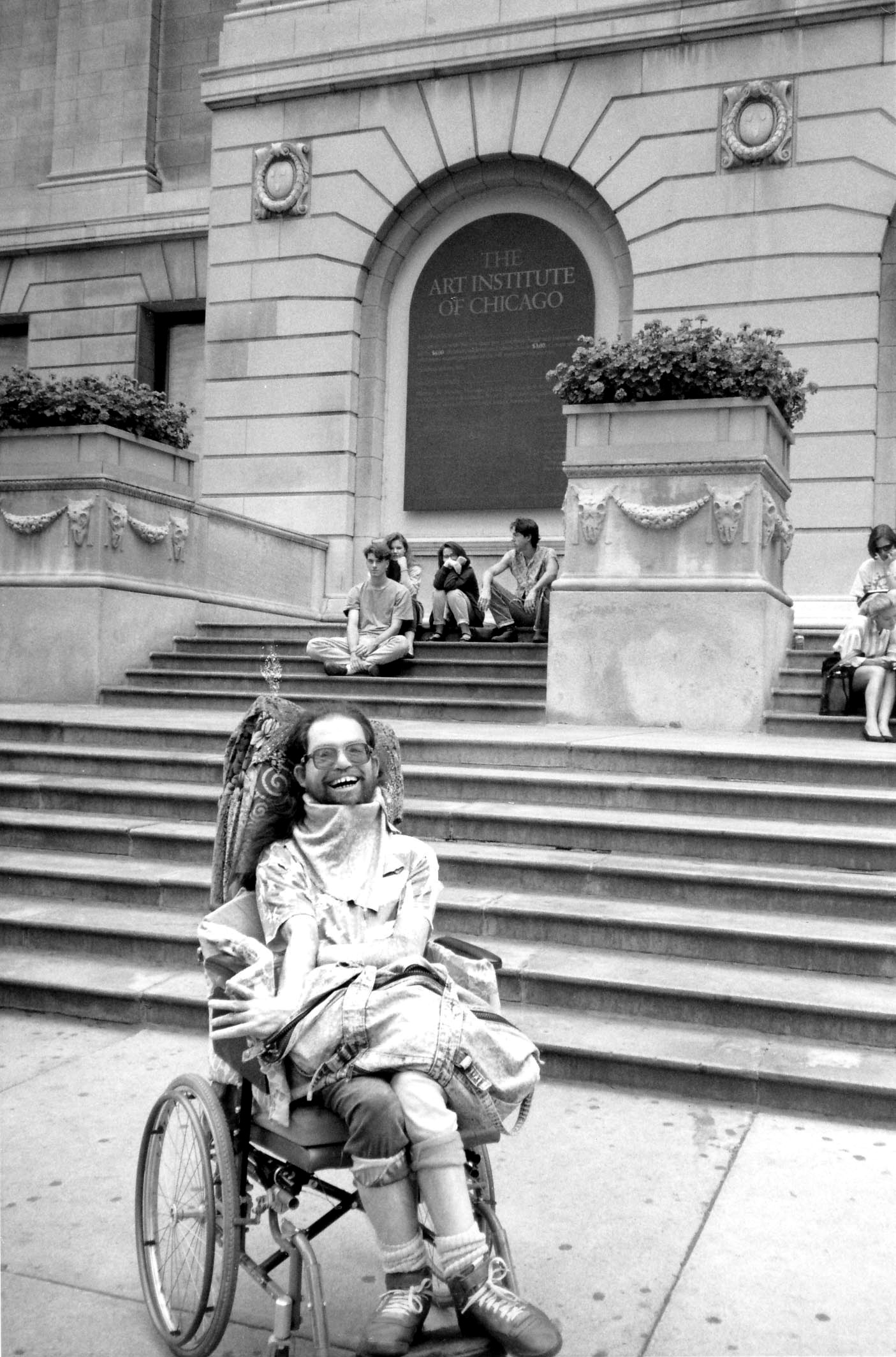
- Frank Moore in front of the Art Institute of Chicago 1991 photograph by Linda Mac
- Born: Frank James Moore; June 25, 1946; Columbus, Ohio, United States
- Died: October 14, 2013 (aged 67); Berkeley, California, United States
- Known for: Performance artist

Frank James Moore (June 25, 1946 – October 14, 2013) was an American performance artist, shaman, poet, essayist, painter, musician and Internet/television personality who experimented in art, performance, ritual, and shamanistic teaching since the late 1960s.

Moore was one of the National Endowment for the Arts-funded artists targeted by Jesse Helms and the General Accounting Office in the early 1990s for creating art that was labeled "obscene". He was featured in the 1988 cult film Mondo New York, which chronicled the leading performance artists of that period.

== Life and career ==
Moore was born with cerebral palsy, could not walk or talk, and communicated using a laser pointer and a board of letters, numbers, and commonly used words. Using his pointer, he wrote books, directed plays, directed, acted in and edited films, and regularly gave poetry readings. Moore played piano, sang in ensemble music jams, and led bands in hard core punk clubs all along the West Coast of the United States until his death. He also produced, and exhibited across the United States and Canada, a large collection of original oil and digital paintings.

Moore was known for his long (5–48 hours) ritualistic performances with audience participation, nudity, and eroticism. His writings on performance, art, life, and cultural subversion, and his performance/video archive on Vimeo.com seen by over 32 million people, further influence Moore's legacy.

Moore coined the word "eroplay" to describe physical play between adults released from the linear goals of sex and orgasm. He explored this and similar concepts in performance and ritual as a way for people to connect on a deeper level beyond the social and cultural expectations and limitations.

Frank Moore first came to be known in the 1970s as the creator of the popular cabaret show, the "Outrageous Beauty Revue". In the 1980s Moore attended the San Francisco Art Institute where he earned his M.F.A. in Performance/Video in 1983. At this school Moore discovered that the work that he had been doing for over a decade was called performance art. In 1992 he was voted Best Performance Artist by the San Francisco Bay Guardian. In the early 1990s Moore was targeted by Senator Jesse Helms. From 1991 to 1999 Moore published and edited the underground zine The Cherotic (r)Evolutionary.

In addition to his books, Cherotic Magic, Art of a Shaman, Chapped Lap, Skin Passion and numerous other self-published pieces, Moore was widely published in various art and other periodicals. In artist Pamela Kay Walker's book, Moving Over the Edge, Moore is one of the artists featured as having "greatly impacted me and many people through their artistic expression and their lives."

Moore's award-winning video works have shown throughout North America, and in 2001 he began producing shows for Berkeley's public access channel, Berkeley Community Media, Channel 28. His shows continue to play several times each week.

In 2011, Moore launched his online performance and video retrospective on Vimeo. At the same time he created the "Nude Performance Art, Dance and Video: EROART" group on Vimeo featuring videos by eroart artists from across the world. Eroart is a word coined by Frank Moore to describe art that embraces nudity, eroticism, sexuality, physical play, love, the body, passion for life, pleasure, and is distinguished from pornography. The word eroart first appears in an essay by Moore written in 1984, "Eroplay in Life and Art", then in "Eroart" (1984), and later in "Eroart Not Porn" (1986).

Moore's Vimeo account was terminated by Vimeo in August 2019. Starting that same month, all of the videos have been moved to the Frank Moore Archives on the Internet Archive.

Frank Moore's Web of All Possibilities features a growing archive of his audio, video, visual and written work, as well as the work of other artists. He founded Love Underground Visionary Revolution (LUVeR) in 1999, a webstation combining live streaming and on-demand libraries of audio and video programming, described by Moore as a "non-corporate, d.i.y., totally uncensored, noncommercial, nonprofit internet-only communal collective with 24-hour 'live' programming (by amazing people) with 'no-limits' content." LUVeR ran until 2012.

In 2006, Moore announced his candidacy for the 2008 election for President of the United States. He became a qualified write-in candidate in 25 states. His campaign was responsible for reforming the write-in candidate qualifications and procedures in many states. His platform videos are available on YouTube.

Moore also hosted his regular internet show, Frank Moore's Shaman's Den, from August 1998 until May 2013. Moore describes it as a show that "will arouse, inspire, move, threaten you, not with sound bites, but with a two-hour (usually longer) feast of live streaming video. You might get an in-studio concert of bands from around the world...or poetry reading...or an in-depth conversation about politics, art, music, and LIFE with extremely dangerous people! But then you may see beautiful women naked dancing erotically. You never know, because you are in The Shaman's Den with Frank Moore." Video and audio archives of all of these Shaman's Den shows are available online.

Frank Moore died of pneumonia on October 14, 2013. He performed regularly in the San Francisco Bay Area up until his death.

== Influence and legacy ==
Performance artist Annie Sprinkle considers Moore one of her teachers, and Moore performed with a host of performance and underground punk figures since the 1970s. including Barbara Smith, Linda Carmella Sibio, The Feederz, and Dirk Dirksen - The Pope of Punk.

Frank Moore's life and art are now documented in a web video series called Let Me Be Frank.

As of September 2017, Frank Moore's work is archived at the Bancroft Library at the University of California, Berkeley. The collection is titled "Frank Moore papers, approximately 1970-2013."

In April 2018, the Berkeley Art Museum and Pacific Film Archive (BAMPFA) accepted two of Frank's oil paintings into their permanent collection: Mariah (1977), and Patti Smith (1979). Patti Smith was also included in the BAMPFA exhibition, Way Bay 2, in June 2018.

In 2019, a collection of Frank Moore's work was archived at the Performistanbul Live Art Research Space in Istanbul, Turkey.

In January 2023, the Berkeley Art Museum and Pacific Film Archive (BAMPFA) mounted a solo exhibition of Frank Moore's oil paintings titled Frank Moore/MATRIX 280: Theater of Human Melting. The exhibition ran from January 25 through April 23, 2023 and was curated by Vincent Fecteau and Keith Wilson.

In 2024, three of Frank's oil paintings, Superman, Frankenstein, and Unicorn, were part of the exhibition, For Dear Life: Art, Medicine, and Disability, at the Museum of Contemporary Art San Diego (MCASD) in La Jolla, California.

In August 2026, the entire collection of physical materials from LUVeR, Love Underground Visionary Revolution, the audio/video streaming station Moore started in February 1999 that ran until April 27, 2012, were shipped off to be archived and stored at the Internet Archive.

In September 2026, the archive of video tapes and DVDs of Moore's public access TV shows, "Frank Moore's Unlimited Possibilities", "Deep Core Magic" and "Going Deep to the Core at Ramen with Frank Moore" were donated to Berkeley’s public access TV channel, BTV.
