= Constantina Zavitsanos =

Feminist artist

Constantina Zavitsano
- Awards: Wynn Newhouse Award (2015)

Constantina Zavitsanos is a conceptual artist. Their works are organized around themes of planning, contingency, debt, dependency and care. Zavitsanos is a part of disability community as a care provider and recipient. They live in New York City and teach at The New School.

== Education ==
Zavitsanos is a graduate of Millersville University, where they received a B.F.A., and the Pennsylvania Academy of the Fine Arts, where they received an M.F.A.

== Career ==
Zavitsanos has had many exhibitions including:

- Coop Fund, Amalle Dublon & Constantina Zavitsanos, Devin Kenny, John Neff. Artists Space. New York, 2018.
- Challenge 3. The Samuel S. Fleisher Art Memorial. Philadelphia, PA, 2009.

Zavitsanos has participated in several artist residencies. In March–September 2015, Zavitsanos held a residency at The New Museum, where they curated a series of collaborative events with artists Reina Gossett, Park McArthur, Caroline Key, and Soyoung Yoon, and academics Stefano Harney, Fred Moten, and Denise Ferreira da Silva. In 2017, they and collaborator Amalle Dubon participated in the Engaged Social Justice Residency Program at the University of British Columbia in Vancouver.

They are a recipient of the 2015 Wynn Newhouse Award presented to disabled artists. They received the 2021 Roy Lichtenstein Award. Zavitsanos was also the 2021-22 Keith Haring Fellow.

== Notable works ==
- It was what I wanted now was nearly invisible (2013) is a stack of papers next to a wall. Four- and five-digit-long numbers are printed on the paper tracking Zavitsanos’ projected student loan debt over the next 25 years and the minimum income necessary to make monthly loan payments. Corinna Kirsch of ArtFCity has described the work as a strong statement with limited means. As Kirsch put it, "if a loan officer handed me thousands of pages showing my future indebtedness, I might’ve rethought signing away my future."
- Sweepstakes (2015) Zavitsanos was a plaintiff in a class action lawsuit brought against the New York Police Department for wrongful arrest during the 2004 GOP convention in New York. New York City settled the case in 2015. Zavitsanos incorporated her settlement into the art work "Sweepstakes" at the New Museum where viewers were given a portion of the settlement on a daily basis.

== Partial Bibliography ==
- “Other Forms of Conviviality” with Park McArthur for Women and Performance: a journal of feminist theory (2013)
- “The Guild of the Brave Poor Things” with Park McArthur in Trap Door: Trans Cultural Production and the Politics of Visibility (MIT Press, 2018)
