= University of Texas at Dallas academic programs =

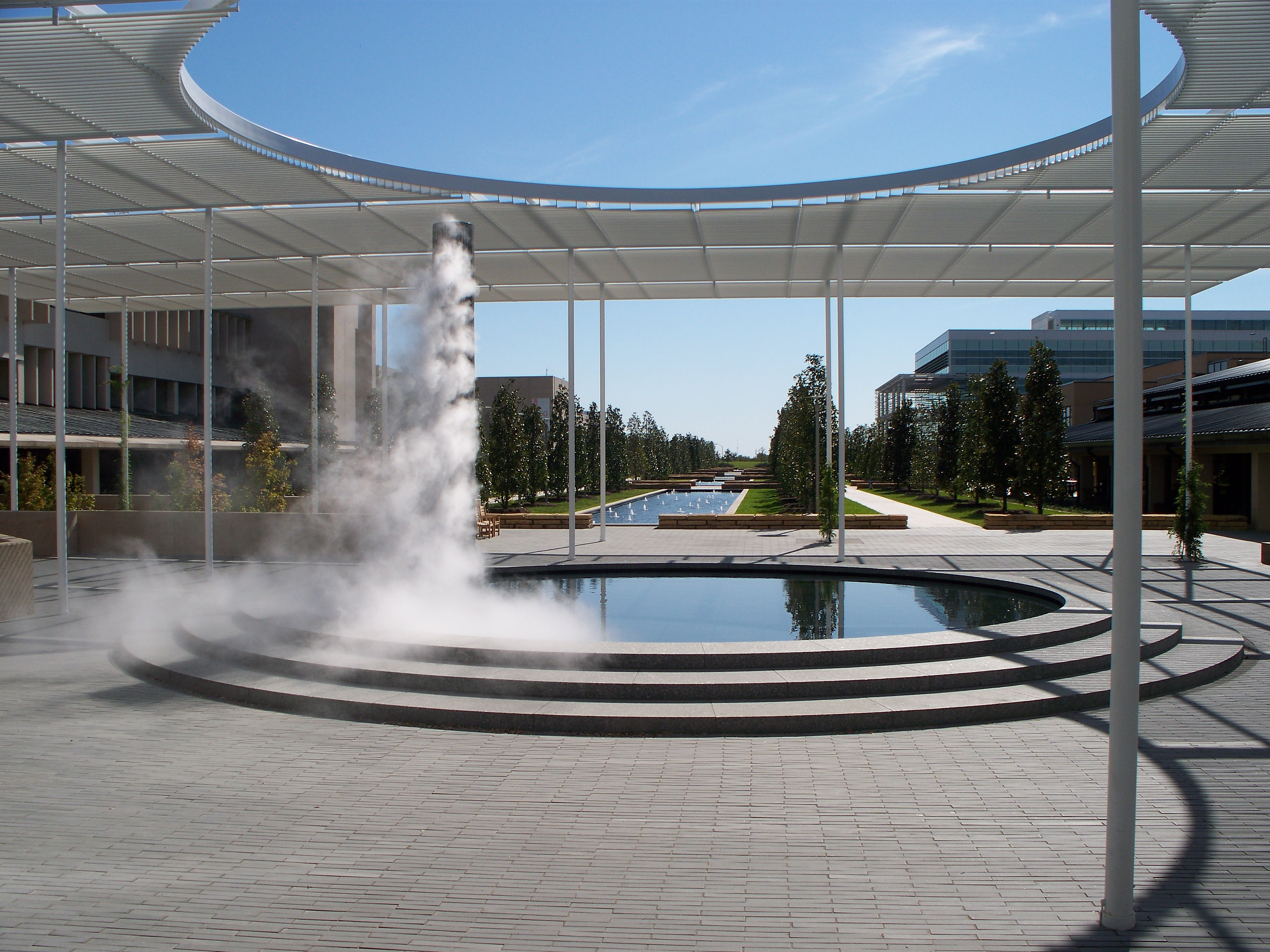
The Plinth, located between the McDermott Library and Student Union buildings

The University of Texas at Dallas (also referred to as UT Dallas or UTD) is a public research university in the University of Texas System. The University of Texas at Dallas main campus is located in Richardson, Texas. The University of Texas at Dallas offers over 148 academic programs across its seven schools, including 57 baccalaureate programs, 59 masters programs and 32 doctoral programs, and hosts more than 40 research centers and institutes. The school also offers over 50 undergraduate and graduate certificates.

With a number of interdisciplinary degree programs, UT Dallas’ curriculum is designed to allow study that crosses traditional disciplinary lines and to enable students to participate in collaborative research labs. UT Dallas offers some dual degrees, including M.S. Electrical Engineering (M.S.E.E.) degree in combination with an MBA in management, Molecular Biology and Business Administration (Double Major) B.S., and Molecular Biology and Criminology (Double Major) B.S.. Geospatial Information Sciences is jointly offered with the School of Natural Sciences and Mathematics and with the School of Economic, Political and Policy Sciences, which administers the degree. UT Dallas also has a School of Interdisciplinary Studies, a program designed for students to pursue unconventional or innovative combinations of course work.

== Harry W. Bass Jr. School of Arts, Humanities and Technology ==
The newest of UT Dallas’ schools, the Harry W. Bass Jr. School of Arts, Humanities and Technology (AHT) was formed as a merger between the School of Arts and Humanities (A&H) and the School of Arts, Technology, and Emerging Communication (ATEC). The merger between the two schools was approved by the UT System in July 2022 and went into effect at the beginning of the Fall 2022 semester. According to Inga H. Musselman, vice president for academic affairs, the purpose of the merger was to “enhance the student experience, advance research and support the mission of [the] arts, humanities, technology, and communication programs.” This merger was stated to not affect any degree programs or curriculums that were part of either school of study. As of September 2022, there have been no plans announced to create any new degree plans or buildings for this school of study.

On May 9, 2023, the school was named in honor of Harry W. Bass Jr. after the Harry W. Bass Jr. Research Foundation made a $40 million gift.

=== Academics ===
The Harry W. Bass Jr. School of Arts, Humanities and Technology offers courses in literature, animation, game design, critical media studies, foreign languages, history, philosophy, music, drama, and film.

At the undergraduate level, the school offers Bachelor of Arts degrees in history, Latin American Studies, Literature, Philosophy, Visual and Performing Arts, & Arts, Technology, and Emerging Communication. The school also offers 20 minors, which include Art History, Ethnic Studies, Literature, and Theater.

The Harry W. Bass Jr. School of Arts, Humanities and Technology also offers a variety of graduate degrees. There are Master of Arts programs for Art History, History, History of Ideas, Humanities, Latin American Studies, Literature, Visual and Performing Arts, & Arts, Technology, and Emerging Communication (Arts, Technology, and Emerging Communication also offers a Master of Fine Arts program). The school also offers Doctoral Studies in History of Ideas, Humanities, Literature, Visual and Performing Arts, & Arts, Technology, and Emerging Communication.

The Harry W. Bass Jr. School of Arts, Humanities and Technology also has certificate programs for Creative Writing, Literary Translation, & Holocaust, Genocide, and Human Rights Studies. There are also a variety of language study courses housed under the school that are not directly related to a specific degree plan, such as Arabic, French, German, and Japanese.

=== Merged Schools of Study ===
The School of Arts and Humanities was established in 1975.

The School of Arts, Technology, and Emerging Communication originated as two separate degree programs hosted under the School of Arts and Humanities, and was done as a joint venture alongside the Computer Science department of the Erik Jonsson School of Engineering. The first program for Arts and Technology was introduced in 2004, and the second program for Emerging Media and Communication was introduced in 2008. Due to the high number of students enrolling in the degree programs, it was announced that the degree programs would be merging into a new school of study. The School of Arts, Technology, and Emerging Communication was officially authorized by the UT System Board in 2015.

The School of Arts, Humanities, and Technology was established in 2022 as a merger of the former School of Arts and Humanities and School of Arts, Technology, and Emerging Communication.

=== Centers and institutes ===
- Ackerman Center for Holocaust Studies
- Center for Asian Studies
- Center for Translation Studies
- Center for US-Latin America Initiatives (CUSLAI)
- Center for Values in Medicine, Science and Technology
- The Crow Collection of Asian Art
- The Edith O'Donnell Institute of Art History
- SP/N Gallery

=== Labs and Studios ===
- 3D Studio
- Anechoic Chamber and Transmedia Studio
- AntÉ Institute
- ArtSciLab
- CG Animation Lab
- Creative Automata Lab
- Critical Media Studies Lab
- Emerging Gizmology Lab
- experimenta.l. Animation Lab
- Fashioning Circuits
- Game Lab
- Games Research Lab
- LabSynthE
- Mograph Lab
- Motion Capture Lab
- Narrative Systems Research Lab
- Public Interactives Research Lab (PIRL)
- SP&CE Media
- The Studio for Mediating Play

== School of Behavioral and Brain Sciences ==
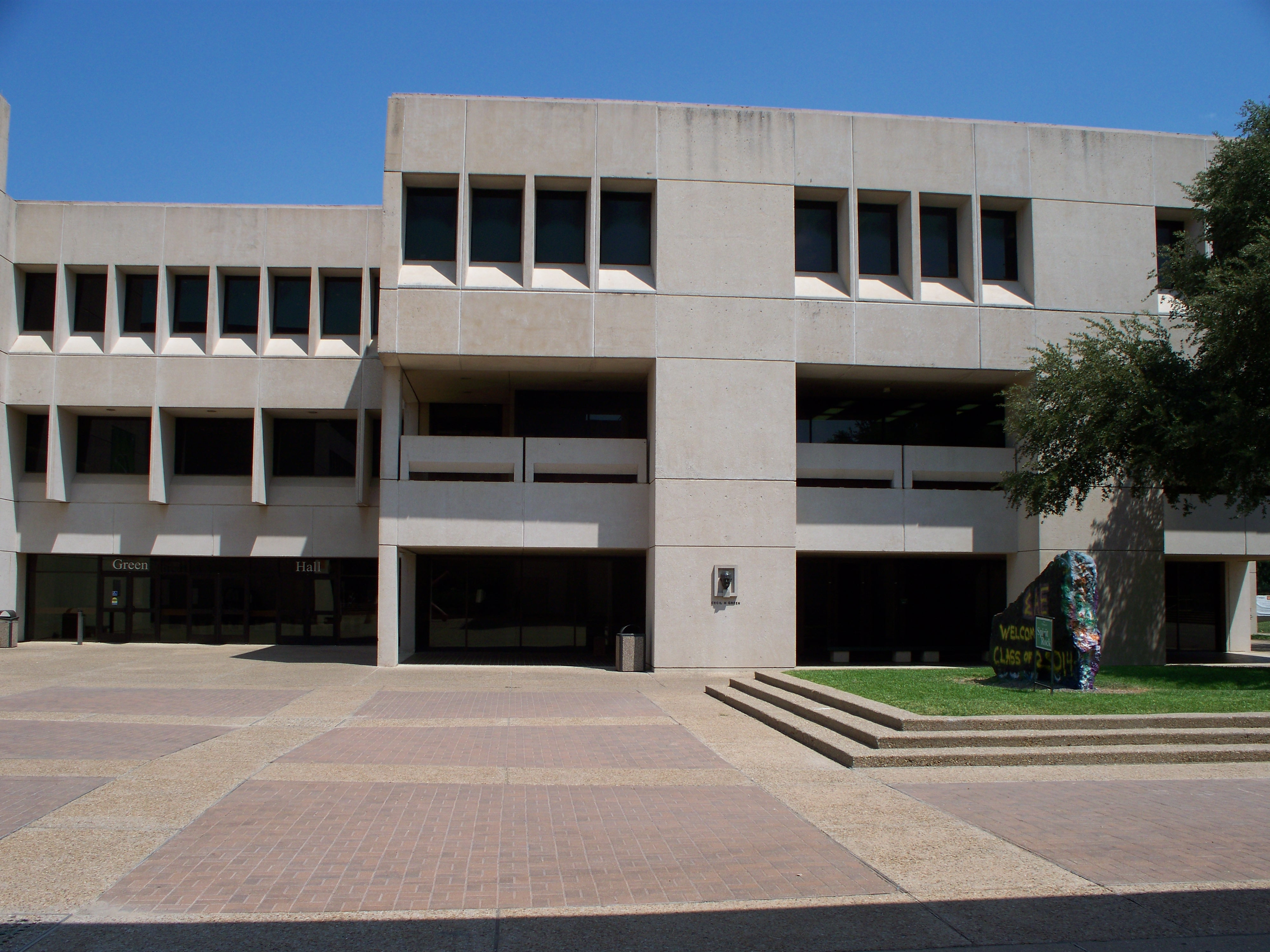
Green Hall and Spirit Rock

The School of Behavioral and Brain Sciences (BBS) opened in 1963 and is housed in Green Hall on the main campus of the University of Texas at Dallas and in the Callier Center for Communication Disorders. It offers degrees in Child Learning and Development; Cognitive Science; Neuroscience; Psychology; and Speech, Language, and Hearing Sciences.

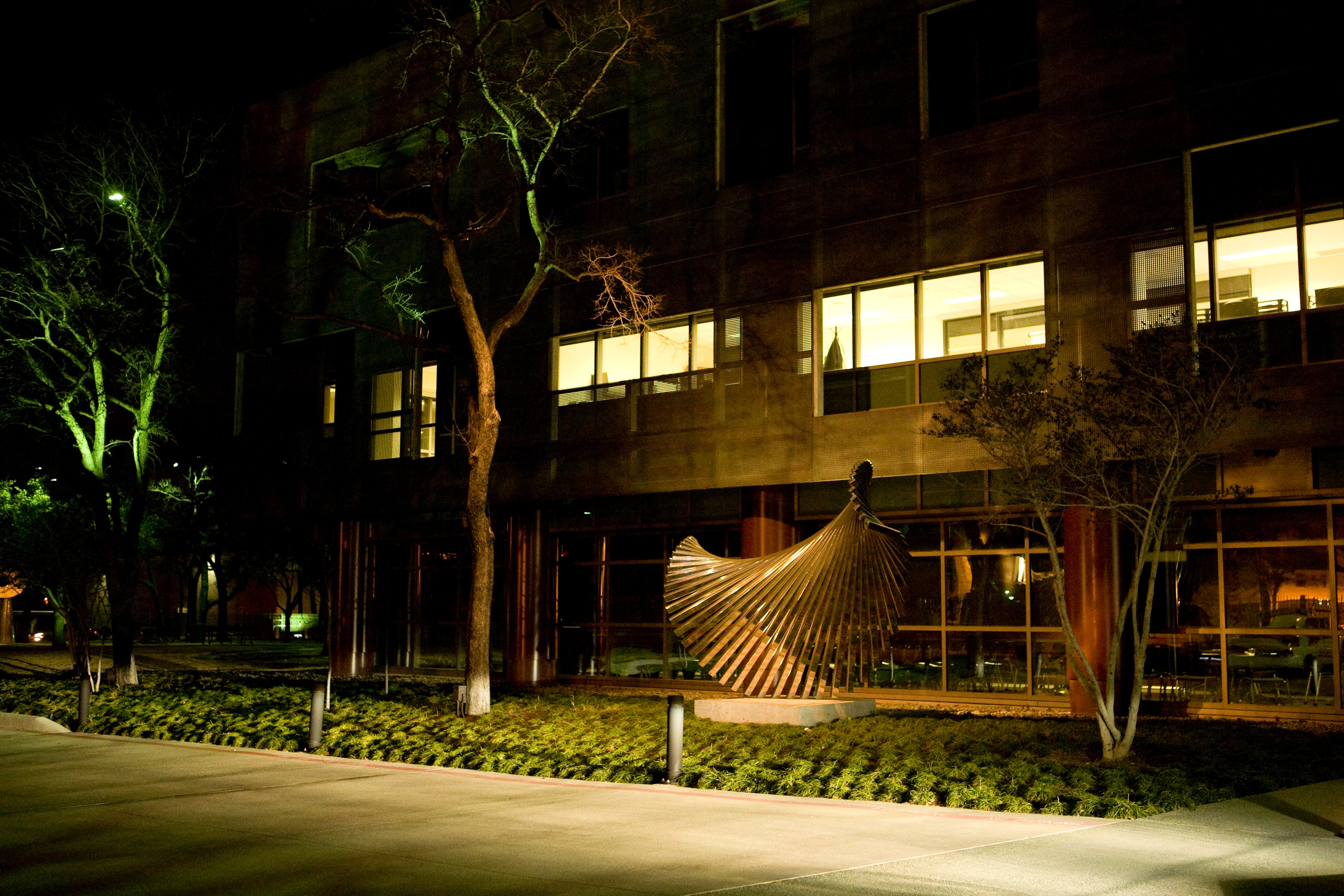
Center for BrainHealth

=== Centers and institutes ===
- Center for Advanced Pain Studies
- Callier Center for Communication Disorders
- Center for BrainHealth
- Center for Children and Families
- The Center for Vital Longevity

== School of Economic, Political and Policy Sciences ==
The School of Economic, Political and Policy Sciences (EPPS) offers courses and programs in criminology, economics, geography and geospatial sciences, political science, public affairs, public policy and political economy, and sociology. UTD became the first university in Texas to implement a PhD Criminology program on October 26, 2006, when its program was approved by the Texas Higher Education Coordinating Board. The EPPS program was the first from Texas admitted to the University Consortium for Geographic Information Science and offered the first Master of Science in geospatial information sciences in Texas. UT Dallas was the fourth university in the nation to have its Geospatial Intelligence Certificate accredited by the US Geospatial Intelligence Foundation (USGIF), a collection of many organizations including Raytheon, Lockheed Martin and GeoEye. UT Dallas’ Geography and Geospatial Sciences program ranked 16th nationally and first in Texas by Academic Analytics of Stony Brook, N.Y. In a 2012 study, assessing the academic impact of publications, the UT Dallas criminology program was ranked fifth best in the world. The findings were published in the Journal of Criminal Justice Education.

=== Centers and institutes ===
- Center for Crime and Justice Studies
- Center for Global Collective Action
- Center for the Study of Texas Politics
- Institute for Public Affairs
- Institute for Urban Policy Research
- The Negotiations Center

== Erik Jonsson School of Engineering and Computer Science ==
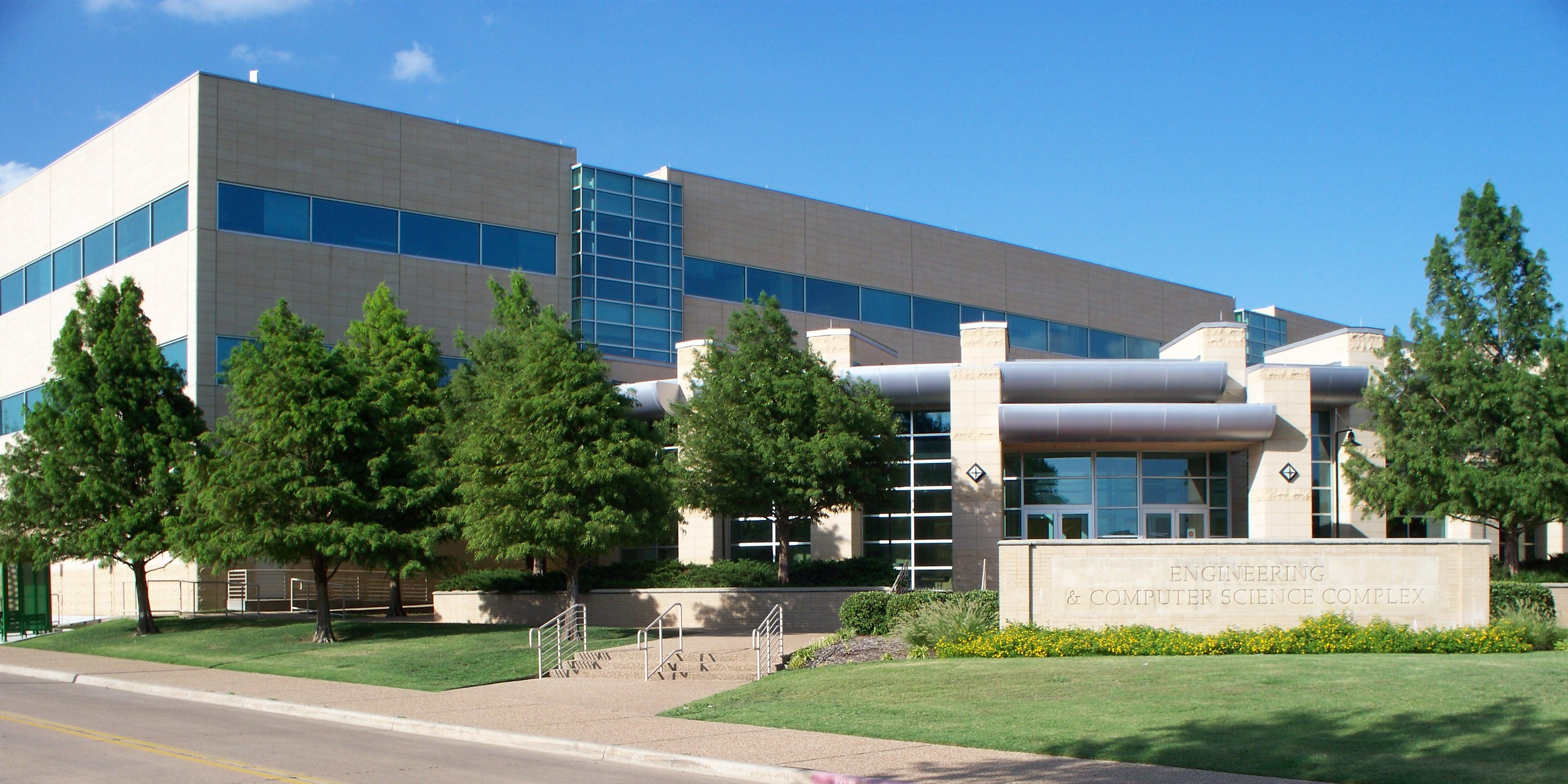
Engineering and Computer Science Complex

The Erik Jonsson School of Engineering and Computer Science opened in 1986 and houses the Computer Science and Electrical Engineering departments as well as UTD's Computer Engineering, Materials Science & Engineering, Software Engineering, and Telecommunications Engineering programs.

In 2002 the UTD Erik Jonsson School of Engineering and Computer Science was the first in the United States to offer an ABET-accredited B.S. degree in telecommunications engineering and is one of only a handful of institutions offering a degree in software engineering. The Bioengineering department offers MS and PhD degrees in biomedical engineering in conjunction with programs at the University of Texas Southwestern Medical Center at Dallas and the University of Texas at Arlington. UT Dallas undergraduate programs in engineering have emerged in U.S. News & World Report's annual rankings placing 60th among the nation's public schools of engineering. The school's graduate program U.S. News ranked 46th among public graduate schools of engineering and third among publicly funded schools in Texas. The school's electrical engineering graduate program ranked 38th among comparable programs at other public universities and the graduate program in computer science is among the top 50 such programs at public universities. The school is developing new programs in bioengineering, chemical engineering, and systems engineering. The school is designated a National Center of Academic Excellence and a National Center of Academic Excellence in Information Assurance Research for the academic years 2008–2013 by the National Security Agency and Department of Homeland Security.

=== Centers and institutes ===
- Center for Advanced Telecommunications Systems and Services (CATSS)
- Center for Integrated Circuits and Systems (CICS)
- Center for Systems, Communications and Signal Processing (CSCSP)
- Cybersecurity Research Center (CSRC)
- Embedded Software Center
- Emergency Preparedness Center
- Global Information Assurance Center
- Photonic Technology and Engineering Center (PhoTEC)
- Texas Analog Center of Excellence
- CyberSecurity and Emergency Preparedness Institute
- Human Language Technology Research Institute
- Center for Basic Research in Natural Language Processing
- Center for Emerging Natural Language Applications
- Center for Machine Learning and Language Processing
- Center for Robust Speech Systems (CRSS)
- Center for Search Engines and Web Technologies
- Center for Text Mining
- CyberSecurity Research Center
- Embedded Software Center
- Emergency Preparedness Center
- Global Information Assurance Center
- InterVoice Center for Conversational Technologies

== School of Interdisciplinary Studies ==
The School of Interdisciplinary Studies, formerly The School of General Studies, provides interdisciplinary programs encouraging students to understand and integrate the liberal arts and sciences. The school offers a Bachelor of Arts in Interdisciplinary Studies, Bachelor of Science in Interdisciplinary Studies, Bachelor of Science in Healthcare Studies and Masters of Arts in Interdisciplinary Studies.

== Naveen Jindal School of Management ==
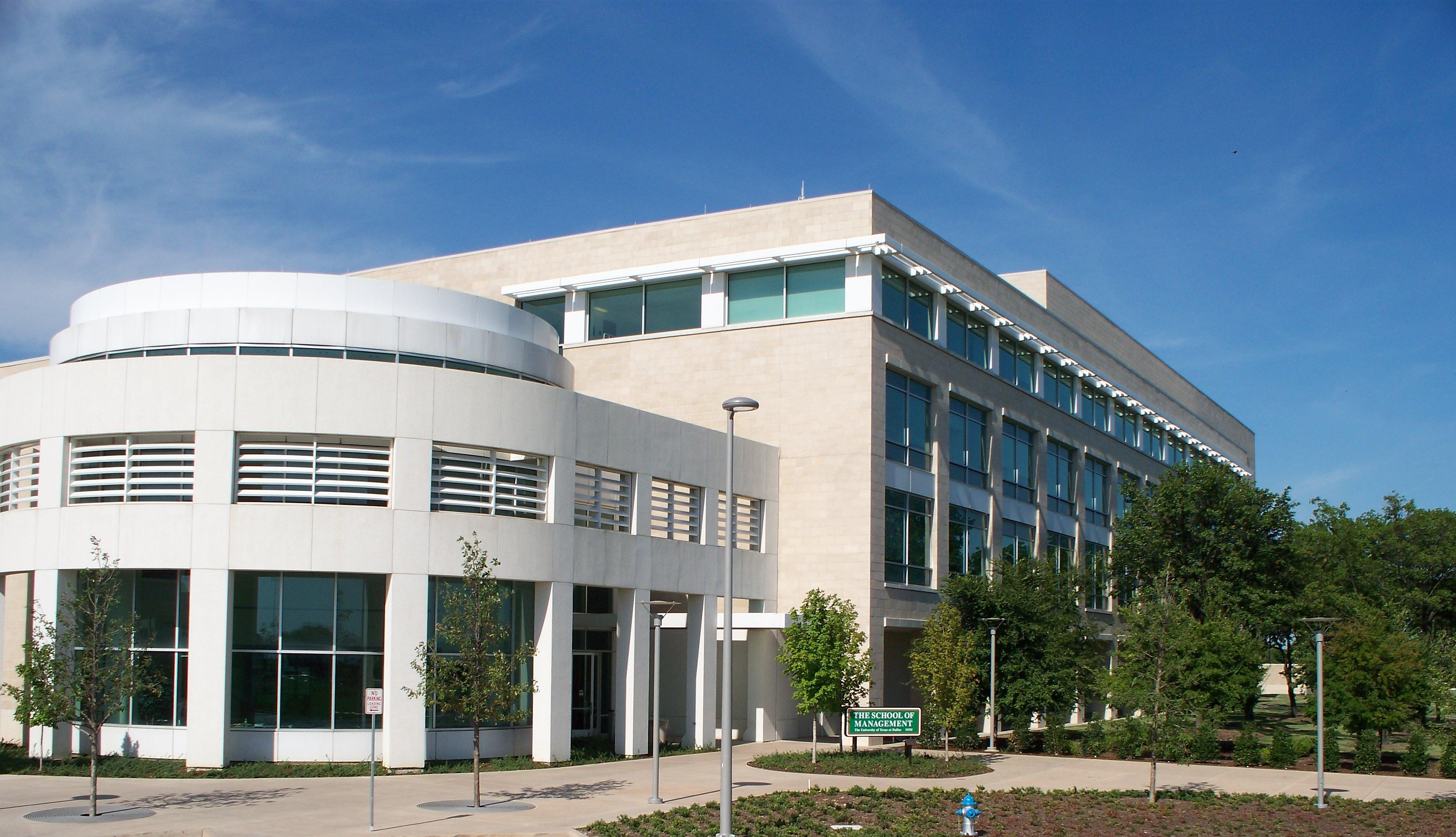
Naveen Jindal School of Management

The School of Management opened in 1975 and was renamed to the Naveen Jindal School of Management on October 7, 2011, after alumnus Naveen Jindal donated $15 million to the business school. The school is accredited by the Association to Advance Collegiate Schools of Business. UTD's undergraduate business programs ranked 81st overall and 39th among public university business schools in the U.S. according to BusinessWeek's 2010 rankings and ranked 30th in overall student satisfaction The Bloomberg BusinessWeek public universities rankings of undergraduate programs by specialty placed the UTD school of management 10th in both accounting and business law, 1st in teaching of quantitative methods, 3rd in teaching of calculus and sustainability concepts, 6th in financial management, 7th in ethics and 9th in corporate strategy course work. The 2010 U.S. News & World Report ranks the Full-Time MBA program among the top 50 in the nation, 24th among the nation's public universities and 3rd for public school programs in the state of Texas. Bloomberg BusinessWeek, 2009, ranked the UTD Executive MBA program "top ranked" at 22 globally and the Professional Part-Time MBA program in the top 25 nationally. The Wall Street Journal ranked UTD's Executive MBA program 6th in the nation by ROI and the 2009 Financial Times rankings placed UTD's Executive MBA program 1st for public universities in Texas and 51 globally. In 2015 the Full-Time MBA and Professional MBA programs at the UT Dallas Naveen Jindal School of Management have been ranked at number 42 by Bloomberg BusinessWeek. In the 2018 Best B-School by Bloomberg, The Jindal School sits at number 43.

=== Centers and institutes ===
- Center and Laboratory for Behavioral Operations and Economics
- Center for Finance Strategy Innovation
- Center for Information Technology and Management
- Center for Intelligent Supply Networks
- Center for the Analysis of Property Rights and Innovation
- Institute for Excellence in Corporate Governance
- Institute for Innovation and Entrepreneurship
- Center for Internal Auditing Excellence
- International Accounting Development: Oil and Gas
- International Center for Decision and Risk Analysis
- Leadership Center at UT Dallas
- Morris Hite Center for Marketing

== School of Natural Sciences and Mathematics ==
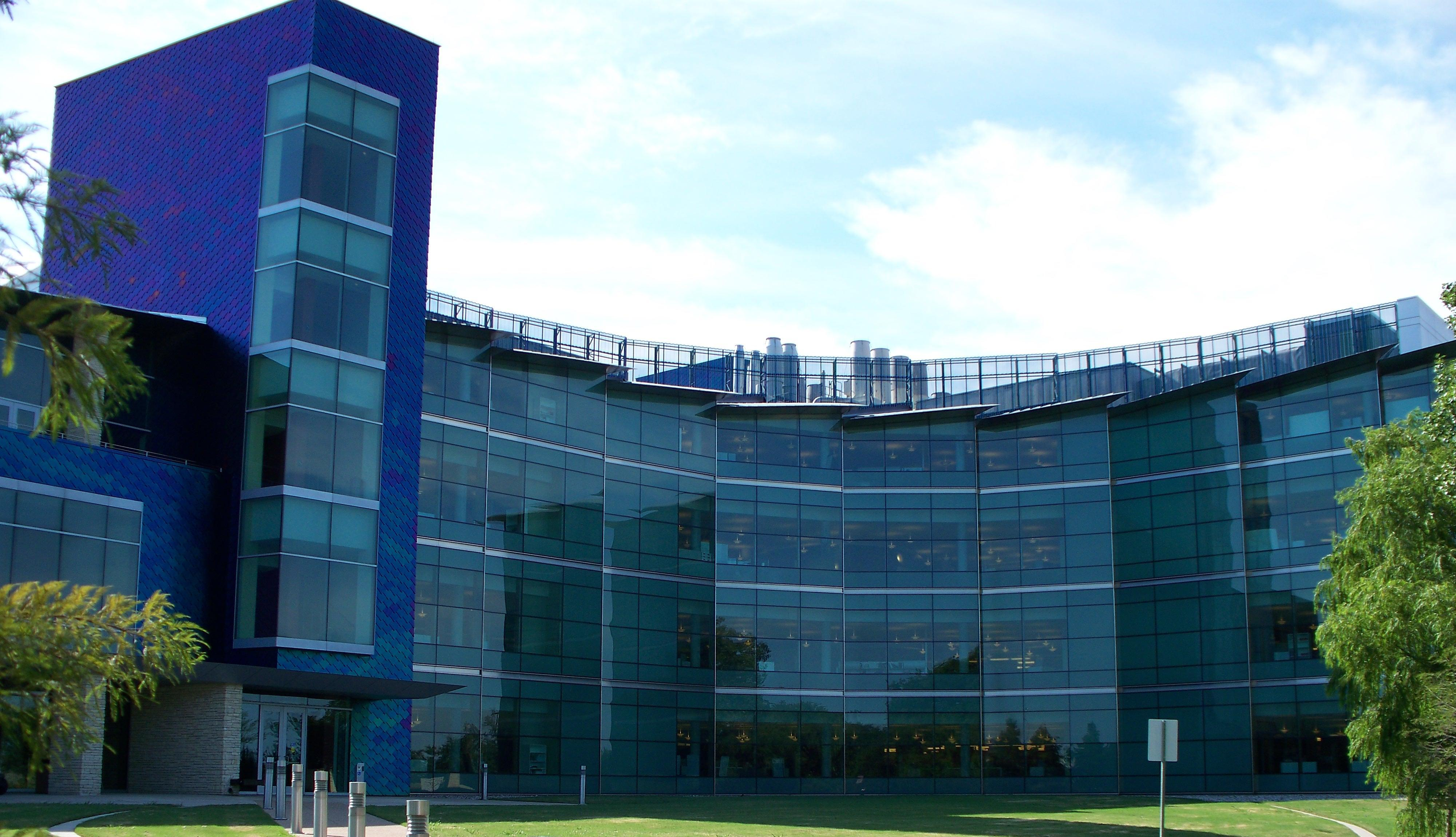
Natural Science and Engineering Research Laboratory

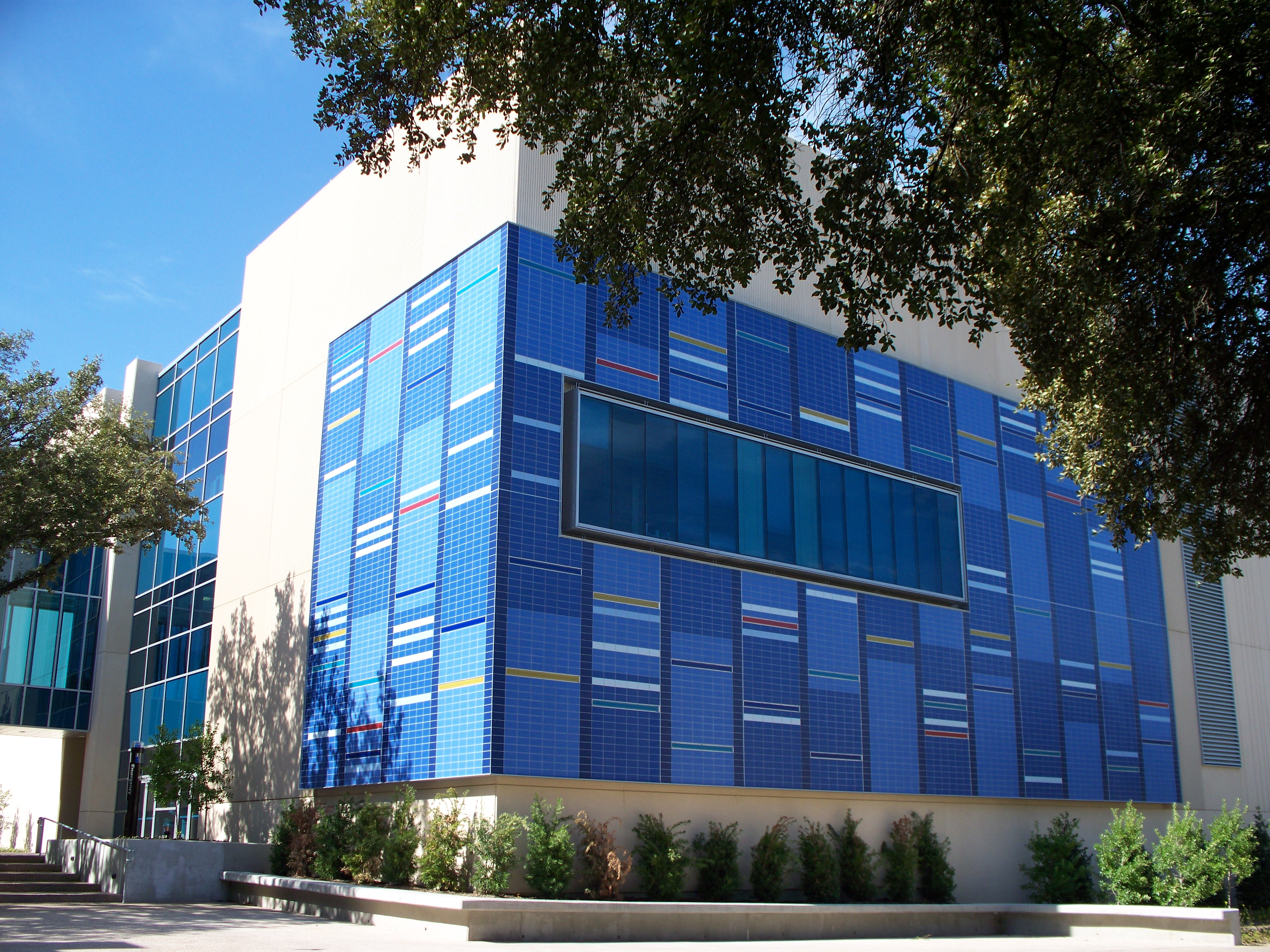
Science Learning Center. The tile exterior represents two patterns: atomic emission spectra of gases, and human DNA.

The School of Natural Sciences and Mathematics offers both graduate and undergraduate programs in Biology and Molecular Biology, Chemistry and Biochemistry, Geosciences, Mathematical Sciences (Note: Mathematics and Statistics, Actuarial Science, and Data Science), and Physics, and a graduate program in Science Education. Undergraduate and post-baccalaureate programs in teacher certification are administratively housed in the School of Natural Sciences and Mathematics but serve other schools as well.

=== Centers and institutes ===
- Advanced Imaging Research Center
- Alan G. MacDiarmid NanoTech Institute
- Quantum Information Science Initiative
- William B. Hanson Center for Space Sciences
- Center for STEM Education and Research

=== UTeach Dallas ===
UTeach Dallas, in the School of Natural Sciences and Mathematics, was modeled after UT Austin's teacher preparatory program. It was created to address the current national deficit of qualified math, science, and computer science teachers, as well as K-12 students' lack of interest in the STEM fields.

== Honors program ==
Collegium V is the selective honors and enrichment program of the University of Texas at Dallas. The program offers honors courses with smaller class sizes, in addition to extracurricular and social events, career counseling, and a collaborative community lounge space. Students in the program have the opportunity to graduate with Collegium V Honors.

The Hobson Wildenthal Honors College offers several programs and support resources for high achieving students:

- The Eugene McDermott Scholars Program
- The Collegium V Honors Program
- The Davidson Management Honors Program
- National Merit Scholars Program
- Terry Scholars Program
- Office of Distinguished Scholarships
- Archer Program
- Phi Kappa Phi
- Texas Legislative Internship Program
- Model United Nations

== Notable alumni ==
- Aziz Sancar
- Gjeke Marinaj
- Naveen Jindal
- Gary Farrelly
- Christeene Vale
- PJ Raval
- Gabriel Dawe
- Phyllida Barlow
- Kelli Connell
- Brian Fridge
- Stephen Lapthisophon
- Dadara
