= Gretzinger =

Gretzinger is a surname of German origin. Notable people with the surname include:

- Bert Gretzinger (born 1951), Canadian curler
- Jerry Gretzinger (born 1942), American folk artist and fashion designer
- Steffany Gretzinger, American singer-songwriter
