= Plexus A1 =

Threaded installation by Gabriel Dawe

PLEXUS A1
- Artist: Gabriel Dawe
- Year: 2015
- Medium: Embroidery Thread
- Dimensions: 5.8 m × 3.7 m × 7.6 m (19 ft × 12 ft × 25 ft)
- Location: Renwick Gallery, Washington D.C.

Plexus A1 is a threaded installation by Mexican-American artist, Gabriel Dawe. It is an individual piece within the larger series entitled “Plexus.” The “Plexus” project attempts to represent the entire spectrum of visible light using only embroidery thread. The series is named after the term used to describe a network of branching blood vessels. This specific installation, Plexus A1, was installed in the Renwick Gallery of the Smithsonian Museum. It was a part of the “Wonder” exhibit, an event that featured the work of nine different contemporary artists and celebrated the reopening of the gallery after a two year renovation. Plexus A1 was designed without the use of a single mock-up or any aid from computer generated algorithms. Construction occurred in 2015 over the brief span of just 10 days. It was solely composed of regular, pre-dyed, 100% polyester sewing thread. Plexus A1 utilized 15 different hues of thread, totaling 60 miles in length.

== Design and construction ==
Due to the size constraints of Plexus A1, Dawe could not simply transport a final piece, rather, the entirety of its construction was to take place within the confines of the Renwick Gallery. This then demanded a flawless planning process prior to the actual construction. The intricate process began with a close examination of the space designated to host the installation. Dawe’s pieces are extremely site-specific, requiring him to closely map out the room. The most challenging feature of the Renwick Gallery was the width of the designated zone. This width was quite compact due to four preexisting support columns. His investigation also included a great deal of forethought regarding how to best interact with the lighting of the piece’s eventual surroundings.

After gathering pools of information, Dawe spent days extensively working on several versions of beginning sketches. These computer-rendered sketches assessed numerous combinations of color progressions, structures, and sequences. Dawe has no background in mathematics, the most complex formula he employed during this process was the Pythagorean Theorem. He also never used algorithms; rather, he primarily depended on repeated visual experimentation. His trial and error process, while tedious, did not end until he felt he had optimized the trompe l’oeil effect. This effect refers to the geometric optics that alter the viewer’s perspective, deceiving their eye into seeing a single ray of light instead of a web of string. Eventually, Dawe arrived at a culminating sketch. He then adapted his sketch into a carefully plotted matrix that identified the precise curvature and blended color gradient of the final quadratic surface. His final configuration, which sharply fanned off the two dimensional plane, maximized the angles available within the room’s tight width.

Plexus A1 was constructed completely by hand. It was erected by Dawe with the help of two assistants. The team constructed 4 wooden platforms, two fixed from the ground and two diagonally fixed from the 19’ ceiling. Each platform was then configured with a network of metallic hooks. Next, Dawe meticulously stretched bundles of embroidery thread into a specifically ordered, color-categorized layers. This organization ensured the execution of his intended gradient. Yet, the color scheme of each layer was not entirely rigid. Some of the hues overlap, a feature that gave the piece a gradual and gentle transition through the spectrum. With the assistance of a mechanical lift, Dawe used a telescoping rod as a giant needle to individually string each thread up and through the hooks pinned to the ceiling beams. He then lowered the lengths of the fiber down to his assistants, who looped the thread through the anchored hooks resting on the ground. Dawe’s teams diligently continued this process for a week and a half until the thousands of intricately placed connections had been completed.

== Social conversations and interpretations ==
The process Dawe used to create Plexus A1 is an adaption of a traditional embroidery method practiced in his home village, just outside Mexico City. However, as a child Dawe’s grandmother refused to teach him this technique, finding that form of needlework to be contradictory to masculine ideals prevalent in Mexican culture at that time. Despite his grandmother’s wishes, Dawes routinely stole bundles of thread in an endeavor to learn the craft on his own. Years later, while undertaking his MFA at the University of Texas, Dawe revisited this practice during his conception of the “Plexus” series. Given this context, Canadian art historian, Jonathan Rinck views “Plexus A1” as a piece that directly challenges the patriarchal, “machismo” norms prevalent in both Mexico and the U.S.. He sees the embroidery process as a means to subvert the gender stereotypes that molded Dawe’s youth. Rinck finds that it is in this way that Dawe’s work shatters the artistic confinement often engendered by hyper-masculinity.

Independent art critic, Sarah Tanguy, noted that Plexus A1’s “minimalist composition of lines and cast shadows suggested the banner of LGBT rights.” Tanguy’s comments foreshadowed the tremendous amounts support garnered by the LGBTQ+ community. Plexus A1 became an emblem approbated in several LGBTQ+ magazines, online texts, and websites. Many members of the LGBTQ+community commended Plexus A1 for its thematic principles of pride and freedom of expression. In an interview with Smithsonian Magazine journalist Anutia Ault, Dawe stated that his stylistic choices, in particular, the use of the rainbow, were never politically motivated. However, during that same interview, Dawe also went on to reciprocate support for the LGBTQ+ community, stating that he “has always valued inclusion and unity.” “Plexus A1,” along with the series as a whole, has drawn a lot of similitude to clothing. The fact that these pieces are comprised completely out of textiles gives rise to many such comparisons. Patricha Marlarcher, editor for the Surface Design Journal, asserts that Dawe’s artwork functions as a nurturing layer of protection for the spirit, much like “the luminous interiors of the Catholic Churches” in Mexico City. Plexus A1 has also been noted to shelter and preserve the childlike nature of the human soul, serving as a catalyst that sparks a sense of wonder from times past.

== Removal and relics ==
Plexus A1 was available to the public until July 10, 2016 and was shortly thereafter dismantled. Dawe never attempts to transport or relocate his works. They are built within the space they inhabit and disassembled in the same fashion. However, once removed, Dawe collects all of the thread and amasses it into a plexiglass cube. Plexus A1, took similar form, becoming what Dawe has termed as a “Relic.” Dawe directly borrows this practice from Catholic lore, mimicking the dichotomy between the life and death of the piece. He finds that these “Relics” have a “grand and delicate quality,” as they signify a transformation from a massive network to a “small and dense lump of thread.”

== General sources ==
- Wonder. (2016). In Issues in Science and Technology (Vol. 32, pp. 70–78). National Academy of Sciences.
