= Bill Shannon =

American artist (born 1970)

- Born: 1970 (age 54–55); Nashville, Tennessee, U.S.
- Occupation: Performer
- Known for: Performance Art
- Website: whatiswhat.com

Bill Shannon (born 1970) is an American artist who resides in Pittsburgh, Pennsylvania. Shannon holds a BFA from the School of the Art Institute of Chicago. Born with a degenerative hip condition, he developed a way to express himself through dance and skateboarding on crutches.

== Performances ==
Performances and video work include:

- Kaaitheater, Brussels
- Performance Space 122, NYC
- The Kitchen, NYC
- Sydney Opera House Studio Theater, Australia
- Walker Art Center, Minneapolis
- danceAble, Florida Dance Festival and Tigertail, Miami
- Portland Institute for Contemporary Art, OR
- Central Park SummerStage, NYC
- Dance City, Newcastle, England
- Contact Theater, Manchester, England
- Museum of Contemporary Art, Chicago
- Arizona State University, Tempe
- The Exit Festival, Cretiel, France
- Amman International Festival of Independent Theater, Amman, Jordan
- Holland Festival, Amsterdam
- Temple Bar, Dublin, Ireland
- URB Festival, Helsinki
- Melbourne Fringe Festival
- Teatro de la Ciudad in Monterrey, Mexico
- "Work It Out" music video by RJD2 (2007)
- 'Life flows better' Visa advert, (2009)

In 2002, he completed a project with Cirque du Soleil choreographing parts of their production Varekai.

His visual and multimedia art have been exhibited in contemporary museums, galleries and fairs include:

- ArtDC in Washington, DC (2007)
- Kiasma
- Helsinki Museum of Contemporary Art in Finland (2005)
- Tate in Liverpool, England (2003)
- Headlands Center for the Arts in San Francisco (2005).

== Awards ==
- Dance Magazine's "25 to Watch" in 2001
- John Simon Guggenheim Fellowship in 2003
- Foundation for Contemporary Arts Grants to Artists award (2000)
- Colbert Award for Excellence: The Downtown Arts Projects Emerging Arts Award
- Pennsylvania Council of the Arts Interdisciplinary Arts Fellowship
- Wynn Newhouse Award in 2010

== Grants ==
- National Endowment for the Arts
- the National Dance Project of the New England Foundation for the Arts
- Jerome Foundation
- New York Foundation for the Arts
- New York State Council for the Arts
- James E. Robison Foundation
- Bossak-Heilbron Charitable Foundation
- The Harkness Foundation for Dance
- Arts International: The Fund for U.S. Artists at International Festivals.

== Competitions ==
- 2000: Mantis Battle (Solo Category) in NYC; placed second in ProAms Florida (Abstract Category)
- 2002: Most Creative Street Dancer by the LA Urban Dance Festival.
