= Jerron Herman =

American choreographer (born 1991)

- Born: 1991 (age 34–35); Alameda, California, U.S.
- Education: New York University
- Known for: Dancer, Choreographer, Writer and Performance Artist
- Website: https://jerronherman.com

Jerron Herman (born 1991) is an American choreographer, dancer, performance artist, writer and a teacher for the Dream Project at National Dance Institute for children with disabilities. He grew up in California as part of a religious and art loving family. He has the movement disorder Cerebral palsy, the symptoms of which he has absorbed into his dance movements.

He also has been, since 2017, the vice chair of the board of trustees at Dance/USA and a guest lecturer at various institutions.

== Early life and education ==
Herman was born in Alameda, California in 1991. At 3 months old Jerron was diagnosed with Hemiplegia cerebral palsy which he sees as God's "best tool" for him. Herman experiences involuntary movement on one side of his body (his left side).

He has lived in New York City since 2009 when he moved there to attend New York University to study playwriting and afterwards at the New Victory Theater in 2011. He began to develop as a dancer in 2012. He then further studied at the Kings College where he studied Media, Culture and Art with an emphasis of in Art history and Playwriting. He graduated from there in 2013.

While he was doing his studies he was discovered by a choreographer who led him to audition for Heidi Latsky, for whom he has worked ever since.

"I grew up in a Christian home where I was often told that God is the author of palsy – that it's intentional, and it's part of your life," Herman told Faithwire. "So it was never couched in the context of 'lack.' My disability was not a defect – it was an asset.

== Art development and training ==
Herman's condition specifically affects the left side of his body where he has less muscle tone and movement. He has developed training routines to help him workaround this and to help strengthen his weaker left side. His methods include balancing on one side and maintaining a length and straightness through his upper body.

To further improve his strength he carries out many plank routines which assist in strengthening his pelvis. He also swims sometimes as it keeps his joints mobilised.

As part of his warm up routine before performances he uses a specific breathing exercise where he takes in tight deep breaths, exhaling narrowly and in a way that can be heard. This makes him feel lifted and invigorated for going on stage.

Through his dancing he has created pieces that are personal to him using his body to demonstrate past experiences. At the same time he likes to ensure his audience can relate to this and imagine themselves in the same position. An example of this is his piece, 'Phys, Ed' where he explores his experiences of Physical education in his youth.

== Work ==
Herman is a multifaceted, interdisciplinary, American artist based in New York City known for his work as a choreographer, writer, principal dancer and development director. He is currently signed with Kinetic Light, a performing arts company depicting themselves as a "disability arts ensemble" working solely with disabled people in the disciplines of art, technology, design and dance. By embracing disability culture, Kinetic Light connects to the modern conversations and traditions of the artists in all their fields.

He serves as part of the board of trustees at Dance/USA, has modelled for Tommy Hilfiger Adaptive and for a Nike sponsored project. He was profiled in Great Big Story and in 2018, he was nominated for a Fellowship in Dance from United States Artists. His latest solo work includes Phys Ed and Relative – a crip dance party and Breaking and Entering – a collaboration with Molly Joyce, musician, where both explore congenital and acquired physical disability through their parallel left hand sides.

Prior to this he was a principal member of the Heidi Latsky Dance company from 2012 to 2019 under which he performed in GIMP/Out of Doors, Lincoln Center, 2012, Triptych, Montclair State University, American Dance Festival, The Whitney Museum, 2015 and On Display, Highlights: The United Nations, Stavros, Niachros Foundation Cultural Center, The Whitney Museum, Lincoln Center, ICA Boston 2015.

== Featured performances ==
- 'BREAKING AND ENTERING', at the Danspace Project (Premiere). Co-created with Molly Joyce, 2019
- 'MANY WAYS TO RAISE A FIST', at The Whitney Museum (Premiere), special for the 29th Anniversary of the ADA. Featured artists: Shannon Finnegan, Ezra Benus, Ryan Hartley Smith, & Mike McManus, 2019
- 'RELATIVE', at the Performance Space New York (Premiere), as part of i wanna be with you everywhere; collaborator: Kevin Gotkin, 2019
- 'PHYS, ED' at the Danspace Project (Premiere), 92nd Street Y, Brooklyn College, 2017
- 'APPEARANCES' at Movement Research, Creative Mornings: BAM Jon Burgerman), The Invisible Dog (Liz Jackson) Hillsong NYC | Galapagos Art Space | Google
- 'ON DISPLAY' Highlights: The United Nations, Stavros Niachros Foundation Cultural Center, The Whitney Museum, Lincoln Center, ICA Boston, 2015–
- 'TRIPTYCH' at Montclair State University, American Dance Festival, The Whitney Museum (excerpt), 2015
- 'GIMP | OUT OF DOORS' at the Lincoln Center, 2012 (Debut)

== Activism ==
Herman has been involved in numerous organisations which promote equity and opportunities in the arts for people with disabilities. In 2019, he joined with Sarah Reisman, executive and artistic director of the Shelley and Donald Rubin foundation, to create a public workshop called 'Access', where a group of artists and cultural producers were invited by Herman to present case particular situations where 'access' for those with disabilities has been tested or advanced.

A National Endowment for The Arts webinar, in which Herman was a speaker for, was also set up in 2019 to encourage people with disabilities to pursue careers in the arts.

Herman has also been involved with a dance, art, technology and design company called 'Kinetic Light', which aims to inspire those with disabilities to become more involved with the arts and cultural life. Herman, alongside other disabled artists, works on performances which showcase the talents of artists with disabilities and 'promote disability as a creative force enabling new understandings of the moving world.'

== Awards ==
2020 Disability Futures Fellowship – Andrew W. Mellon Foundation and The Ford Foundation

2020 WYNN Newhouse Award – WYNN Newhouse Foundation

2021 Grants to Artists Award – Foundation for Contemporary art

2021 Jerome Hill Artist Fellowship – Jerome Foundation
