= E. Jane =

American new media artist

- Born: Bethesda, Maryland, US
- Other name: MHYSA
- Education: Marymount Manhattan College (BA); University of Pennsylvania School of Design (MFA)
- Occupations: Interdisciplinary new media artist, musician
- Years active: 2015–present
- Awards: Wynn Newhouse Award (2016)

E. Jane, also known by their performance name MHYSA, is an American interdisciplinary new media artist and musician.

== Early life and education ==
Jane was born in Bethesda, Maryland in 1990. Jane graduated from Marymount Manhattan College in 2012 with a Bachelor of Arts in art history. In 2016, they graduated with a Master of Fine Arts in interdisciplinary art from the University of Pennsylvania School of Design.

== Career ==
They have participated in various exhibitions and festivals internationally, including Wandering/WILDING: Blackness on the Internet at IMT Gallery in London in 2016, Post-Cyber Feminist International in 2017, and Glasgow International in 2018.

Jane was a 2019–2020 Artist-in-Residence at The Studio Museum in Harlem, and they are based in Brooklyn, New York.

=== MHYSA ===
Jane performs under the musical alter ego name, "MHYSA". MHYSA is also a part of the music duo SCRAAATCH, along with collaborator "lawd knows" (who also goes by "chukwumaa"). In 2017, MHYSA released their debut album, fantasii. In February 2020, they released the album NEVAEH for Hyperdub.

The New York Times has said MHYSA's work contains a "wobbly, dreamy club sound". Others have noted the performance as referencing or being connected to 1990s R&B music. MHYSA has described themselves as "an underground pop star for the cyber resistance".

== Selected works ==
=== Lavendra (2015–) ===
Lavendra is a multimedia installation. It was displayed in exhibitions at the PennDesign MFA Program in 2015 and 2016, and as a solo exhibition at the Brooklyn gallery American Medium in 2017 and the Glasgow International in Scotland in 2018. The installation includes references to 1990s R&B (rhythm and blues) divas, such as portrait collages of 1990s black female musicians and songs selected from the time. Digital performances by MHYSA were shown on monitors, and the room was covered in purple light.

=== Alive #NotYetDead (2015) ===
Alive was started in 2015 in response to the death of Sandra Bland. Bland was found hanged in a cell after a traffic arrest in 2015. Jane created a photobooth background with the word "ALIVE" for black women to take pictures with and share on social media using the hashtag #notyetdead. These selfies were uploaded to a website and also displayed in an installation.

== Personal life ==
Jane uses they and them pronouns.

== Awards and honors ==
In 2016, they received the Wynn Newhouse Award.

== See also ==
- Womanism
- Afrofuturism
