= Gilles Tréhin =

French artist

- Born: January 10, 1972 (age 54)
- Occupations: Artist; author
- Known for: Drawing
- Notable work: Imaginary city of Urville
- Partner: Catherine Mouet

Gilles Tréhin (born 1972) is a French artist, author, and autistic savant. He is known for creating the imaginary city of Urville. His book, also titled Urville, is based on his writings of the fictional city's history, geography, culture, and economy, and includes over 300 drawings of different districts of Urville, all done by Trehin.

== Early life ==
Gilles Tréhin was born in 1972, to Chantal and Paul Tréhin. Chantal was a maths teacher, though would later become a psychologist, and Paul was an executive at IBM.

Gilles has said that he lived in the United States from 1978 to 1981. As a child, he experienced delayed acquisition of speech, followed by echolalia, being aloof when interacting with other children, and hypersensitivity to specific noises. At the age of five, Tréhin began drawing in three dimensions without receiving teaching to do so. Tréhin was diagnosed with Asperger syndrome when he was eight years old, which became an autism diagnosis. In 1980, the National Society for Autistic Children exhibited some of his work at their headquarters.

== Urville ==
Since the age of 12, in 1984, Tréhin began working on the design of an imaginary city, Urville. This arose from a visit to New York City, as well as a Lego airport that Tréhin built for his toy planes, having bought a die cast set while he lived in London between 1982 and 1984. It began to expand into a Lego city that would use the airport; Tréhin built a tower which he titled the "Year 2000 Tower". He moved to Cagnes-sur-Mer in southeastern France in 1986, and there began building further Lego towers. He named the city Urville in reference to a real Antarctic research station, Dumont d'Urville, which is in French territory.

After 1987, Tréhin found that the city would not be possible to fully realise in his bedroom with Lego; at around 12 or 13 years of age, he realized that he could instead draw the city. He stopped using Lego in 1991, and over the next year drew a subway map and began writing a history of the city, and by 1993 his drawings became more frequent.

The imaginary city is situated off the coast of the French Riviera between Cannes and Saint-Tropez, on an island off the coast of Cagnes-sur-Mer, where Tréhin lives. Tréhin has drawn many plans of the city's urban landscape as well as the architecture of the buildings, which include the "Year 2000 Tower", the "Twin Towers", the "Mégalopolis Tower" and the "Olympic Stadium". The layout of the buildings is often symmetrical and precise. Urville has skyscrapers and neighborhoods with detected houses and shopping streets in 19th and 20th century styles. The streets and buildings of the city are also named. There is an in-universe history associated with Urville, linked to real history, as well as an economy with its evolving and changing sectors. Tréhin has also given Urville a governance system and political figures. Historical forces which have impacted the city include World War II and globalization.

In 2006, Urville by Tréhin's count had almost 12 million inhabitants, meaning that if it was real, it would have been the largest city in Europe. In 2010, Urville was covered in a documentary of the same name directed by Angela Christlieb, largely about the real areas named Urville; in Vosges, Champagne, and Calvados. It represents the fictional city using footage of night scenes from cities including Beijing, Shanghai and Brasília, which are superimposed on top of each other.

== Personal life ==
Tréhin lives in Cagnes-sur-Mer, near Nice, in southeastern France with his companion Catherine Mouet who is also autistic.

== See also ==
- Outsider art
- Jerry Gretzinger, a folk artist known for drawing a map
- Stephen Wiltshire, an autistic architectural artist
- Gregory Blackstock, an autistic artist
