= Ping Lian Yeak =

Australian artist

Ping Lian Yeak (born 1993) is a Malaysian Australian artist based in Sydney. He is described as having reached a significant artistic achievement. He was diagnosed with autism at a young age.

== Overview ==
Born in Kuala Lumpur, Malaysia in 1993, Pian Lian Yeak was diagnosed with autism at a young age and was gradually trained in visual arts through the use of private instruction. After his family moved to Sydney in 2006, Yeak's work gained notice and began to be featured at various art and educational venues, including the Treffert center in the United States, Strokes of Genius, Inc and the United Nations building in New York. Yeak's work is described as "colourful and attractive", and he has been described as a prodigious autistic savant.

His art was introduced to the United States at an exhibition at Cooper Union University in Manhattan and the Henry Gregg Gallery in Brooklyn by Dr. Rosa C. Martinez and Dr. Becker in January 2006. Coverage of Yeak's artistic contribution as an individual with autism also includes a feature in a documentary aired on the Australian ABC.

Yeak was a finalist in the Australian Government's 2008 National Disability Awards. Ping Lian Yeak has been internationally featured in numerous books including:

- Knowledge- e6’ by EBS (2011) published in Korea, Ping Lian Yeak included amongst the Real Rain Man (Kim Peek), Albert Einstein, Abraham Lincoln, Warren Edward Buffett, etc.
- Real Reading 3 - Creating an Authentic Reading Experience (2012). English textbook published by PEARSON Longman . ISBN 9780137144433
- The Prodigy's Cousin: The Family Link Between Autism and Extraordinary Talent by J.Ruthsatz and K. Stephens (2016) ISBN 978-1617230189
- "I Want To Be Artist": An Autistic Savant's Voice and A Mother's Dream Transformed onto Canvas (2017). ISBN 9780648035411. Written by Ping Lian’s mom Sarah SH Lee, edited by Dr. Rosa C. Martinez, forewords by Dr Darold Treffert and art critic John McDonald.
- Artism: The Art of Autism; by Debra Hosseini (Author), Rosa C. Martinez PH.D. (Editor) 2011
- ‘Islands of Genius’ by Dr. Darold Treffert (2010)
- Clark, T. (2016). Exploring Giftedness and Autism: A study of a differentiated educational program for autistic savants. Routledge. ISBN 978-1138839540
- “Adventures in Autism” by Peter A. LaPorta (USA) - featured in one chapter of the book
- “The Savant Syndrome: Intellectual Impairment, Astonishing Condition” ISBN 9878683168 by Osvaldo Cairo Battistutti (Mexico, 2021)
- The Covid Canvas: Artist Profiles and Interviews of the Pandemic Era ISBN 978-1-66780-597-9 by Dr. Rosa C. Martinez (USA 2021)

Ping Lian Yeak was also featured in the documentary “FIERCE LOVE and ART”, (USA) narrated by Temple Grandin.

== See also ==
- Autistic art
- Autism rights movement
