= Henriett Seth F. =

Hungarian artist, autistic savant (born 1980)

- Henriett in a swing and Börcsök Enikő, Trafó House of Contemporary Arts, Budapest, 2010
- Born: Fajcsák Henrietta; 27 October 1980 (age 45); Eger, Hungary
- Occupation: Autistic savant artist
- Writing career
- Movement: Autistic art

Henriett Seth F. (born Fajcsák Henrietta, 27 October 1980), also known as Seth F. Henriett, is a Hungarian autistic savant, poet, writer, musician, and artist.

== Youth and education ==
In 1987, the primary schools in her hometown of Eger refused to admit Henriett due to her communication challenges. She was placed in a music and art class, but she would not sing. As a result, she was sent to a primary school for mentally handicapped students in 1989, though she remained in the music and art class. She was found to have echolalia, communication problems, and repetitive behaviors.

Henriett began writing during her early teens. She painted autistic art for the House of Arts in Eger, and the Hotel Stadion of Budapest at the East-European Autism Conference in 2004.

At age 18, she attended Eszterházy Károly College to study at the Psychology Institution, and won the Géza Gárdonyi Prize for her art and literature. She was determined to have a Raven IQ above 140, and a Magyar Wechsler Intelligence Test (MAWI) IQ above 120, with some parts under an IQ of 90, and is thus considered an autistic savant.

=== Writing career ===
In 2005, she wrote and starred in an autobiographical short film titled Esőlány ("Rain Girl"), which was produced by Friderikusz Sándor.

In 2005, she wrote a book titled Autizmussal önmagamba zárva ("Closed into Myself with Autism"), which was published by the Hungarian Autism Research Group and Ministry for National Cultural Heritage.

In 2006, Henriett wrote a novel titled Autizmus – Egy másik világ ("Autism – Another World"). The book was published by the University of Pécs in the New Galaxy anthology.

=== Monodramas ===
In 2010, Orlai Produkciós Iroda produced a monodrama, Nemsenkilény, monológ nemmindegyembereknek ("Notanobodycreature"), from Henriett's book. The textbook contains details of Donna Williams's Nobody Nowhere: The Extraordinary Autobiography of an Autistic Girl, Birger Sellin's Don't Want to Be Inside Me Anymore: Messages from Autistic Mind, and a few lines from Mark Haddon.The Curious Incident of the Dog in the Night-time The monodrama played in the theaters of Esztergom, Budapest, Pécs, Tatabánya, Székesfehérvár, and Eger and was adapted into a TV documentary for Hungarian Television in 2010, and played in Budapest and Gyöngyös theaters in 2011.

=== End of career ===
Henriett ended her creative music career at the age of 13, her creative writing career at the age of 25, and her painting career before the age of 27.

She showed her last artwork in Brody Sandor Public Library in June 2007.

== Works ==
=== In Hungarian ===
- Henriett's unpublished poems from her childhood and teen years before the age 25 with titles: It may be...; Autumn; Well, don't speak this child; Something easy to write and sweet; There in the distance; Silently; Somewhere; A dream in a cage; Liberation from the slavery of the soul and Poem to the patron, on title 2nd Existence, infinity, and the world years between (1989–2005).
- Winner of the XIIth and XIIIth International Literature Competition(2000–2001) International Alliance of Hungarian Writers.
- Novels to the periodical New Face, (2001)
- Autizmussal önmagamba zárva ("Closed into myself with autism") by Henriett Seth F. to Hungarian Autism Research Group and Ministry for the National Cultural Heritage (2005).
- Autizmus – Egy másik világ ("Autism – Another World") by Henriett Seth F. to University of Pécs (2006).
- Novel to the periodical Esőember ("Rain Man") (2006) by Henriett Seth F. from her kindergarten's, primary school's and Eszterhazy College's life.

=== Exhibitions ===
- Henriett Seth F.'s paintings and galleries in House of Arts and Brody Sandor Public Library, Eger, 1993–2007.

=== TV documentaries ===
- Henriett Seth F. on the first digitized videos of childhood autism and savant syndrome in Hungary on investigations and language development with her photos of paintings by Hungarian Autism Research Group, 2002.
- Friderikusz Sándor.: "Seth F. Henriett: Esőlány", ("The Rain Girl") – Freedom of Speech, Hungarian Television, 2005.
- Monodrama from book of Henriett Seth F.: Nemsenkilény, monológ nemmindegyembereknek.

=== Theatre ===
- Monodrama from the book of Henriett Seth F., textbook contains details of Donna Williams, Birger Sellin, and Mark Haddon: Nemsenkilény, monológ nemmindegyembereknek ("Notanobodycreature") in Esztergom's Theatre, Budapest Trafó House of Contemporary Arts, Pécs's Harmadik Theatre, Tatabánya's Jászai Mari Theatre, Székesfehérvár's Vörösmarty Theatre, Eger's Gárdonyi Géza Theatre, Budapest's Radnóti Színház, Gyöngyös's Mátra Művelődési Központ, by Orlai Produkciós Iroda, 2010- 2011.

== Reception and reviews ==
- Henriett Seth F.'s book Autizmussal önmagamba zárva ("Closed into myself with autism") by Alliance Safeguarding for Hungarian Autistic Children and Adults
- Henriett Seth F.'s book Autizmussal önmagamba zárva ("Closed into myself with autism") and Henriett Seth F. by Börcsök Enikő, title with Megoszthatatlan belső magány ("Indivisible internal solitude").
- Henriett Seth F.'s book Autizmus – Egy másik világ ("Autism – Another World") by Magazine Solaria Science Fiction

== See also ==
- Autistic art
- Autistic savant
- List of child prodigies
- List of music prodigies
- List of pseudonyms
- Mel Baggs
