= Ken Grimes =

American artist (born 1947)

Ken Grimes (born 1947) is an American artist from New York City. He was raised in Cheshire, Connecticut and creates his art at Fellowship Place in New Haven, Connecticut. Grimes is widely considered to be an outsider artist.

Grimes' artwork consists of monochrome drawings and paintings, typically consisting of white text and diagrams on a black background. His art deals with themes of coincidences, outer space, extraterrestrial life, and UFOs. Grimes received a Wynn Newhouse Award for his work in 2013.

== Mental illness ==
Grimes was diagnosed with paranoid schizophrenia in his twenties, leading to his withdrawal from college. He was hospitalized five times between 1971 and 1978.
