= Gabriel Dawe =

Gabriel Dawe (born 1973) is a Mexican-born artist living in Dallas, Texas, whose work is based on investigations of the visible spectrum of light. He has gained renown for his large-scale Plexus series of installations of sewing thread, though he also creates works on paper as well as other media. His work has been exhibited in the US, Canada, Belgium, Denmark, and the UK.

== Background ==
Originally from Mexico City, Dawe initially trained as a graphic designer, but during his studies at the University of Texas at Dallas, he began to investigate the connection between fashion and architecture. His use of materials related to textiles stems from a childhood frustration of not being allowed by his grandmother to learn traditional needlework because of societal expectations for boys.

=== Education ===
He received his bachelor's degree in Graphic Design from Universidad de las Américas, Puebla, Mexico and his MFA at the University of Texas at Dallas, where he was an artist in residence at CentralTrak for the final two years of his degree.

== Plexus series ==
Named for the network of blood vessels or nerves that run throughout the body and form connections, Dawe's Plexus series are large-scale networks of sewing thread that are investigations of the visible spectrum of light. They are often site-specific, temporary commissions that the artist transforms into compacted displays of thread he calls relics when the exhibitions are over.

Most notably, the artist's work was part of the reopening of the Renwick Gallery in the exhibition Wonder. He has also installed Plexus works at the Amon Carter Museum of American Art, Brigham Young University, and the Denver Art Museum, among others.

== Selected solo exhibitions ==
=== 2023 ===
- Blanton Museum of Art

=== 2016 ===
- Plexus No. 34 : Amon Carter Museum of American Art : Fort Worth, TX
- Plexus c18 : San Antonio International Airport : San Antonio, TX

=== 2015 ===
- Plexus A1 : Renwick Gallery of the Smithsonian American Art Museum : Washington, D.C.

=== 2014 ===
- Plexus No. 29 : Brigham Young University Museum of Art : Provo, UT
