= Brian Fridge =

American artist

Brian Fridge (born 1969 in Fort Worth, Texas) is an American video artist. He earned a bachelor in fine arts from the University of North Texas, and a master's degree in fine arts from the University of Texas at Dallas. In both 2005 and 2009, Fridge was a resident at CentralTrak, the University of Texas at Dallas artist residency.

Exhibitions include the inaugural 2005 edition of the Turin Triennial at the Castello di Rivoli - Museo d’Arte Contemporanea in Turin, Italy and the 2000 Biennial Exhibition of the Whitney Museum of American Art in New York. His work is also exhibited in the Whitney Museum of American Art.

His work has been described as "very Zen and wry". A typical work is Vault Sequence (1995), recorded in the artist’s own apartment, the video “seems instead to have come directly from the Hubble telescope". Brian Fridge's low-tech, poetic approach has a precedent in Arte Povera and his explorations of symbol and process are reminiscent of alchemy.
