= Stephen Lapthisophon =

American artist

- Born: March 31, 1956 (age 70); Houston, Texas, U.S.
- Website: stephenlapthisophon.com

Stephen Lapthisophon (born March 31, 1956) is an American artist, writer, and educator working in the field of conceptual art, critical theory, and disability studies.

== Early life and education ==
Lapthisophon was born in Houston, Texas in 1956. He received his BFA from the University of Texas at Austin in 1977 and his MFA from the School of the Art Institute of Chicago in 1979. His early work combined poetry, performance, sound art, and visual arts with postmodern philosophical concerns. He is influenced by the legacy of the Situationists, who sought to make everyday life a focus of artistic activity.

Lapthisophon has taught at Columbia College in Chicago, the School of the Art Institute, and the University of Texas at Dallas. He taught art and art history at The University of Texas at Arlington from 2007-2023.

== Blindness ==
In 1994, at the age of 39, Lapthisophon suffered a major deterioration of his vision due to optic nerve disease, and became legally blind after intensive medical treatment. His subsequent work as an installation artist, graphic artist, art theorist, and sound artist has been marked by this experience. Much of his work comments on, and seeks to redress, the over-emphasis on the sense of sight in aesthetic culture.

"I use my own blindness as a figure for the ways we interpret the world through our own specific framing mechanisms. I have also been more and more drawn to create pieces involving a commentary on the sensory world as understood through food, cuisine, cooking, and interaction through food and the art audience. My recent cooking projects have allowed me to speak to all the senses and examine the interaction of our sensory processes."

== Works ==
In Lapthisophon's works, found objects, written texts, and sound recordings are arranged in a way that allows "layers of meanings, allusions and associations...to accumulate" in the mind of the gallery-goer. In his 2000 installation "Defense d'afficher", two large walls were erected in the gallery space and covered with fragments of found media, photos, and texts. One reviewer in Artforum called it an "overload of simultaneously public and personalized cultural shards."
The juxtaposition of fragments of personal, cultural, and social history can be seen in his 2005 book Hotel Terminus. This interest in juxtaposing fragments extends to many of his installations, which frequently contain found objects like old eye charts, posters and graffiti slogans.
Lapthisophon's other work includes sound recordings, site-specific installations, performances, radio broadcasts, books, lectures, and drawings improvised on walls and framed in exhibitions.

In 2008, Lapthisophon was awarded the prestigious Wynn Newhouse Award for artists with disabilities. In his statement upon receiving this award, Lapthisophon said, "Through investigation of issues of permanence and change in site-specific installations, I hope to...break down the barriers between where the work of art ends and everyday life begins."

== Selected solo and group exhibitions ==
- Paper Chase, Old Jail Art Center, Albany, TX (2022)
- America Will Be!: Surveying the Contemporary Landscape, Dallas Museum of Art, Dallas, TX (2019)
- The Long Goodbye, Museo de la Ciudad Queretaro, Queretaro, Mexico (2017)
- Styles of Radical Will (Italian Sculpture), Sector 2337, Chicago, IL (2016)
- Toccare (Non) Toccare, Nasher Sculpture Center, Dallas, TX (2015)
- Flowers and Numbers, Longhouse Projects, New York, NY (2014)
- Concentrations 56: Stephen Lapthisophon—coffee, seasonal fruit, root vegetables, and ‘Selected Poems’, Dallas Museum of Art, Dallas, TX (2013)
- Tautology, Actual Size, Los Angeles, CA (2013)

== Public Collections ==
- Museum of Contemporary Art Chicago
- Dallas Museum of Art

== Publications ==
- Notebook 1967-68, published by the Nasher Sculpture Center, 2016.
- Writing Art Cinema (1988-2010), published by The Green Lantern Press, 2010, edition of 250.
- Hotel Terminus, published by WhiteWalls, 1999.

== Recognition, residencies, and awards ==
- Artist Honoree, Dallas Art Fair, Dallas, TX (2019)
- Dozier Travel Award, Dallas Museum of Art, Dallas, TX (2015)
- GuestHaus Residency, Los Angeles, CA (2013)
- Moss/Chumley Award, Meadows Museum, Dallas, TX (2012)
- Wynn Newhouse Award (2008)
- Residency Grant, Experimental Sound Studio. Chicago, IL (2002)
- Art Council/Artadia Award, Jury Award Recipient (2001)
- Illinois Arts Council, Project Completion Grant (1999)

== Influences ==
- Arte Povera
- Situationist International
- Robert Smithson
- English Romanticism
- Frankfurt School
