= Jonathan Lerman =

American painter

Jonathan Lerman (born 1987) is an American autistic savant outsider artist. He was born in Queens, NY, and currently resides in the upstate New York suburb of Vestal.

He began to lapse into long silences at the age of two, and the next year he was diagnosed with autism. His IQ is purported to be 53. His artistic bent appeared at the age of 10 years in the form of charcoal-drawn faces—both people he knows and those he imagines. In 1999, he had his own solo exhibition at the KS Art gallery in New York City.

He has had personal exhibitions, and has also exhibited his work alongside others. He was also the subject of the MTV television program True Life in the episode "True Life: I Have Autism" to describe his life as an autistic savant.

== Books ==
- George Braziller. Jonathan Lerman: The Drawings of a Boy with Autism (2002)

== Notes and references ==
- Blumenthal, Ralph (2002-01-16). "Success at 14, Despite Autism; His Drawings Go for Up to $1,200 and Win High Praise". The New York Times.
- Treffert, Darold. "Jonathan Lerman - An Extraordinary Artist". Wisconsin Medical Society. Archived from the original on 2007-12-13.
