= Alexis Mackenzie =

Alexis Anne Mackenzie is a collage artist residing in San Francisco, California. Her work is best known for its detail, surreal elements, and incorporation of typography. She is a graduate of Tufts University and the School of the Museum of Fine Arts' combined degree program in Boston, Massachusetts.
