= Park McArthur =

American artist (born 1984)

Park McArthur (born 1984, North Carolina, USA) is a conceptual artist living in New York City who works in sculpture, installation, text, and sound. McArthur is a wheelchair user whose work uses this position to inform her art.

== Early life and education ==
McArthur received her B.A. from Davidson College in 2006. She then graduated with a Masters in Fine Art from the University of Miami in 2009 and studied at the Whitney Museum of American Art's Independent Study Program, 2011–2012. She also attended the Skowhegan School of Painting and Sculpture in 2012.

== Work ==
About McArthur's 2014 exhibition Ramps, wherein the artist exhibited 20 wheelchair ramps of which she used at the institutions she had worked at previously, writer Andrew Blackley said, "The exhibition displayed the means by which institutions both produce and deny access. Each ramp challenged reappraisal and reinforced a set of past and future foreclosures. ‘Ramps’ enlisted generative, generous responses to the negativity of the institutions she worked in across New York and New England, to the point of engendering the reproduction of those very negative characteristics (by removing the objects’ previously assumed ‘function’). McArthur had the ramps removed from these lending institutions and asked them to have signs posted outside the entrances of their buildings addressing the temporary relocation of the ramps for the public. By extension, at stake and always under threat are the threaded relationships between queerness and disability, the breakdown of their concomitant binaries and the temporality of care."

In 2015, McArthur addressed Felix Gonzalez-Torrez's "Untitled" (Love Letter From the War Front) in Whitney Museum of American Art, Lower Manhattan, New York.

McArthur's work has been described as questioning of "care alongside questions of autonomy and dependency" in regards to the daily experience of disabled individuals. McArthur uses her work to challenge the status quo and give those who are usually marginalized by societal structures a voice. Her choice of medium are sculptures and installations that "conceptually driven and often composed of utilitarian materials such as blocks of foam or a Wikipedia entry." Her works elicit an “experience of activism and jerry-built ingenuity.”

== Other activities ==
- In 2018, McArthur worked with Constantina Zavitsanos to co-write an essay called, “The Guild of the Brave Poor Things”, which proposed methods for valuing interdependence in a society that is focused on individualism.
- In 2022, McArthur was a member of the jury that selected LaToya Ruby Frazier as recipient of the Carnegie Prize.

== Recognition ==
In 2014, McArthur won the Wynn Newhouse Award, an annual prize given to disabled artists in recognition of their artistic merit.

In 2015, McArthur was an Artadia Awardee.

in 2024, McArthur was awarded a Guggenheim Fellowship in Fine Arts.

== Notable solo exhibitions ==
- "Projects 195: Park MacArthur", MoMA, New York, New York (2018)
- "New Work: Park MacArthur", SFMOMA, San Francisco (2017)
- "Poly", Chisenhale Gallery, London (2016)
- Yale Union, Portland, Oregon (2014)
- "Passive Vibration Isolation", Lars Friedrich, Berlin, Germany (2014)
- "Ramps", Essex Street, New York, New York (2014)

== Selected group exhibitions ==
- "2018 57th Carnegie International," Carnegie Museum of Art, Pittsburgh (2018)
- "2017 Whitney Biennial," Whitney Museum of American Art, New York (2017)
- "Incerteza viva: 32nd Bienal de São Paulo", São Paulo, Brazil (2016)
- "Greater New York", MoMA PS1, Long Island City, New York (2015)
