= George Widener (artist) =

Self-taught artist

George Widener (born February 8, 1962) is a self-taught artist who employs his mathematical/calculating capability to create art ranging from complex calendars and numerical palindromes to Rembrandt-like antiquarian landscapes to Asian scrolls. He was born in Cincinnati, Ohio.

== Collections ==
Widener's work can be found in many private and public Outsider Art collections, including the Bruno Decharme ABCD Collection in Paris, The American Folk Art Museum, The Art Collection of the UC Davis M.I.N.D. Institute, and The Collection de l’Art Brut. Widener has exhibited at the Jan Krugier Gallery, Salon du Dessins Contemporain, Kunsthaus Kannen (Münster), the Islands of Genius exhibition (for prodigious savants) and others, and shows at the New York Outsider Art Fair, when New York Times art critic Roberta Smith proclaimed that the artist was “one of the Outsider Art Fair’s most significant recent discoveries”. George is also the subject of a recently published (2009) book The Art of George Widener by Roger Cardinal. Speaking at an October 2008 hallmark event organized under the auspices of the Royal Society and the British Academy on the subjects of autism and creativity, Cardinal illustrated and detailed the 'truly visionary alternative worlds of George Widener".

George Widener lives in the mountain town of Waynesville, North Carolina and travels abroad frequently. He is represented in London by the Henry Boxer Gallery and in New York City by the Ricco/Maresca Gallery.

== Selected exhibitions ==
- Jan Krugier (New York)*
- Kunsthaus Kannen (Munster)*
- Salon du Dessins Contemporain (Paris)*
- New York Outsider Art Fair *
- The Islands of Genius Exhibition (Fond du Lac, Wisconsin; for prodigious savants)
- Secret Universe IV, Hamburger Bahnhof, Berlin 2013
- 'Alternative Guide to the Universe', Hayward Gallery, London, 2013
