= Jerry Gretzinger =

American folk artist and fashion designer (born 1942)

Jerry Gretzinger (born 1942) is an American folk artist and fashion designer. He is best known for his map of an invented landscape known simply as "Jerry's map". Gretzinger has been working on his map for over 60 years; it has grown to include over 4,000 unique panels and is constantly evolving. Jerry's map has been shown at numerous international museums including the Palais de Tokyo, MASS MoCA, and the American Folk Art Museum.

== Early life ==
Gretzinger was born in Grand Rapids, Michigan. In school, he earned a National Merit Scholarship. Throughout childhood, Gretzinger collected oil company maps and would pore over these maps and the family's encyclopedia.

== Career ==
Gretzinger attended the University of Michigan where he enrolled in the College of Architecture & Design. While living in Ann Arbor following his junior year, he was working at a ball bearing factory. During breaks in his work, Gretzinger began to sketch a map on a sheet of paper and when his drawing reached the edge of the page he continued onto the next sheet. These were the first panels of what would become "Jerry's map".

Gretzinger transferred to the University of California, Berkeley, where he continued his studies. During his first fall in San Francisco, Gretzinger applied and was accepted into the Peace Corps. In 1964, he completed training and moved to Tunisia for his service. In 1966, Gretzinger returned to the University of Michigan and completed his studies there. In 1968, he returned to Tunisia as the architect for the archeological project The Corpus of the Ancient Mosaics of Tunisia.

Gretzinger left North Africa to move to New York City in 1971 where he set himself to start a new career. He says, "I knew that I wanted to make things, make a living from what I made, and that's what I devoted myself to." He organized a textiles show of imported Tunisian rugs and began a small business selling pillows and bags he had been making. Partnering with the SoHo Designer's Collective, he began to design a line of experimental clothing. Together with his wife Meg Staley, Gretzinger launched the clothing company Staley/Gretzinger. With Meg's marketing and textile experience, they expanded their clothing line and specialized in turning secondhand clothing into designer fashion. In the years following his move to New York, Gretzinger continued working on his map and it grew in size and complexity; as the business grew and his responsibilities increased, he put the map into retirement to devote himself to the business. Gretzinger moved to Cold Spring, New York and acquired a farm in Maple City, Michigan.

In 2003, Gretzinger's son Hank discovered the map which had been archived in their Cold Spring attic and very soon Gretzinger began work on the map again in earnest. In 2009, he had his first show of the map at the Garrison Art Center in Cold Spring with an accompanying video documentary produced by independent filmmaker Greg Whitmore. The video was featured as an Editor's Choice on Vimeo and shortly after, he was invited to exhibit the entirety of the map and a reproduction of his studio at MASS MoCA. Since then, his map has been featured in numerous publications and solo and group exhibition. Gretzinger's work on the map has grown increasingly abstract incorporating new elements of erasure and collage. Looking towards the future of the map, he sees himself working on the map for as long as he can and is actively looking for museums and collectors to serve as permanent homes for the map.

== Selected exhibitions ==
Gretzinger's work has been included in group (G) and solo (S) exhibitions around the world.

- 2019 York College of Pennsylvania Galleries (S)
- 2019 Intuit, Chicago (S)
- 2018 American Folk Art Museum, New York (G)
- 2017 Edna Carlsten Art Gallery, UWSP | Terrain/Territories: Dreams of Place | (G)
- 2016 Aichi Triennale, Nagoya, Japan | Rainbow Caravan | (G)
- 2016 UICA, Grand Rapids, MI | Coming Home | (G)
- 2015 Thomas Cole National Historic Site, Catskill, NY | River Crossings | (G)
- 2015 Palais de Tokyo, Paris, France | Le Borde Des Mondes | (G)
- 2013/4 Summerhall, Edinburgh, Scotland, UK | Summerhall | (S)
- 2013/4 Brattleboro Museum and Art Center, Brattleboro, Vermont | BMAC | (S)
- 2013 ArtPrize, Women's City Club, Grand Rapids, Michigan (G)
- 2012 MASSMoCA, North Adams, Massachusetts | Press Release | (S)
- 2009 ArtPrize, Urban Institute for Contemporary Art, Grand Rapids, Michigan (G)
- 2009 Garrison Art Center, Garrison, New York (S)
- 2004 City/Space, Oakland, California (G)

== In media ==
In 2026, Gretzinger and the map were the subject of a documentary produced by People Make Games, during the production of which a group of volunteers assembled the entire map at the Strongheart Center in Peshawbestown, Michigan.
