= Linda Carmella Sibio =

American performance artist and painter

- Born: 1953 (age 72–73)
- Other name: Linda Sibio
- Education: Ohio State University
- Occupation: Artist
- Spouse: Blake Matthew Brousseau
- Children: 3
- Website: www.crazyforaday.com

Linda Carmella Sibio (born 1953) is an American performance artist and painter. She is also an advocate for mentally disabled artists and individuals and has publicly identified as a "schizophrenic artist" since 1991.

== Personal life and education ==
Linda Carmella Sibio was born in West Virginia in 1953. After her father died, she was raised in an orphanage while her mother was living in a state asylum. By her account, she started drawing at age 11 because she could not sleep. She was diagnosed with paranoid schizophrenia and manic-depression while she was attending Ohio State University, where she earned her BFA in painting in 1975. She was a student of performance artist Rachel Rosenthal.

She married Blake Matthew Brousseau and the couple worked on films together, including "St. Pity". They had three children. She lives in Desert Hot Springs, California.

== Career ==
In 1990, as part of the Women's Work exhibition at Highways in Santa Monica, Sibio was quoted as saying "There are a lot of women artists but they are expected to work three times as hard before they get any attention... A lot of focus is being given to minority artists, but in the art world women are still minorities."

Her 1991 piece West Virginia schizophrenic blues was a three-and-a-half hour performance telling the story of Sibio's mother and her institutionalization.

She ran two performance troupes, Substation Minus Zero and Operation Hammer which was a group of "mentally disabled artists with a history of homelessness." In 2000, together with Judy Bradford and Adriene Jenik, Sibio formed and directed Cracked Eggs, an interdisciplinary troupe dedicated to "the furthering of art from the mentally disabled."

=== Performer ===
- 1989: Car pool, Highways, Santa Monica, California
- 1989: Blow out, Highways, Santa Monica, California
- 1990: Women's work, Cadman Plaza, New York
- 1990: Azalea trash LA Fringe Theater, Los Angeles
- 1991: West Virginia schizophrenic blues, Cadman Plaza, New York
- 1992: Energy and light and their relationship to suicide, McCadden Place, Hollywood
- 1993: Suicidal particles, Peanuts, Santa Monica
- 1994: Hallelujah! I'm dead, Rachel Rosenthal Studio, Los Angeles
- 1994: One-woman show, Walker Art Center, Minneapolis
- 2003: One-woman show, Andrew Edlin Gallery, New York
- 2015: Melody of chaos Highways Performance Space, Los Angeles
- 2022: Wall Street guillotine

=== Director ===
- 1992: To err in the key of z, Young Moguls, Hollywood, with Operation Hammer. Written by Sibio.
- 2004: The prophet of doom in the banana republic Hi-Desert Playhouse, California

=== Visual arts ===
- 2004: One-woman show, The Joshua Tree Gallery, California
- 2005: The insanity principle Track 16 Gallery, Los Angeles
- 2008: Creativity transcends: Art from the pages of Kaleidoscope Magazine Akron Art Museum, Ohio
- 2018: Double indemnity Colliding Worlds Fine Art Gallery, California
