= Gregory Blackstock =

American artist (1946–2023)

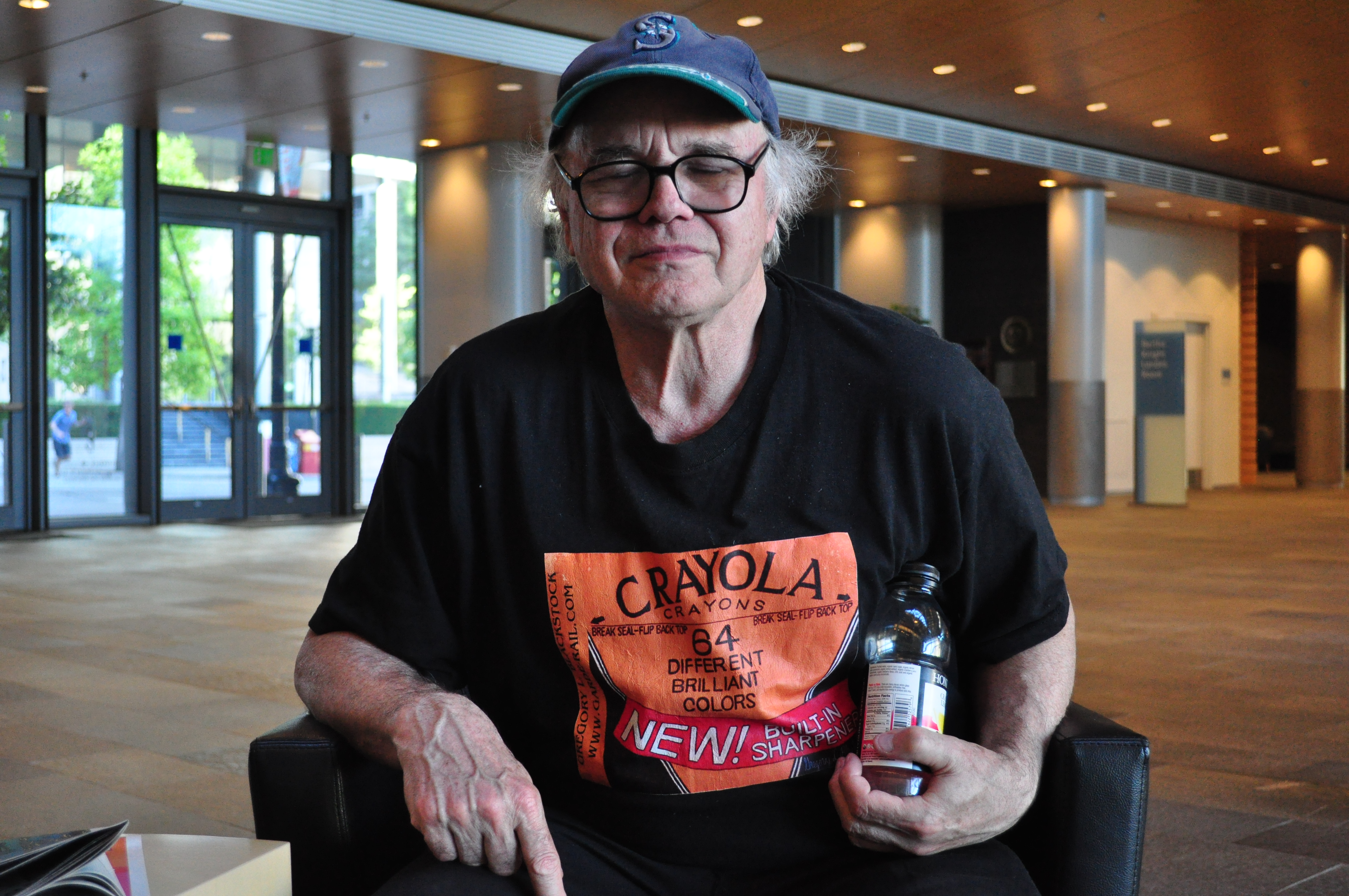
- Blackstock in 2010
- Born: Gregory Lee Blackstock; January 9, 1946; Seattle, Washington, U.S.
- Died: January 10, 2023 (aged 77); Lacey, Washington, U.S.
- Occupation: Artist

Gregory Lee Blackstock (January 9, 1946 – January 10, 2023) was an American self-taught artist. Regarded as an autistic savant, Blackstock created drawings featuring orderly categories of types of objects. A feature article on the artist by the Seattle Weekly described him as an "anthropologist of the everyday." An exhibit review by Seattle Times art critic Robert Ayers described his impact by declaring "Gregory Blackstock is one of our city's greatest artists."

== Early life and education ==
Gregory Lee Blackstock was born in Seattle on January 9, 1946. His mother was a portrait painter. As an infant he did not respond to his mother's voice or to keys jangled in front of him. The family doctor diagnosed Gregory with paranoid schizophrenia. After cultural awareness of autism rose several decades later, his family realized that his symptoms were more in line with a diagnosis of autism spectrum disorder with savant skills.

Despite his intelligence, he was educated at a series of schools for children with developmental disabilities. From the ages of ten to fifteen he was sent to boarding schools for "troubled" children, far from his home and family in Seattle. When he was ten years old he was sent to Devereux Ranch School, a school in Santa Barbara for children with disabilities. He also attended Holly Acres Training School in Applegate, California. He returned to Seattle as a teen and attended Seattle Central Community's Pacific School prevocational program, which provided practical training in a variety of fields. His parents divorced when he was a teenager.

== Work and artistic efforts ==
As a teenager, Blackstock held a job as a newspaper carrier for the Seattle Post-Intelligencer. He worked a series of difficult, menial jobs as an adult, which he described as "drudgery." In his late twenties, he had a position as a janitor in a hotel.

Blackstock worked for twenty-five years as a dishwasher at the Washington Athletic Club. He began drawing images for the club's employee newsletter, taking suggestions for topics from coworkers. Because the newsletter reproduced his images in black and white, he used only pencils, a black marker, and a gray crayon to draw; after his work began being featured in an art gallery he began using bright colors to fill out the black outlines of his work.

Once he retired with a union pension in 2001, he had more time to devote to his drawings. In 2003, his cousin and guardian Dorothy Frisch sent copies of his artwork to Garde Rail Gallery in Seattle, a gallery known for working with outsider artists. In February 2004, the first exhibition of Blackstock's art was held there. He invited friends and former coworkers to the show's opening and played his accordion at the event.

== Artistic style ==
Blackstock's works consist of detailed drawings of visual lists, categorizing things that captured his interest. Art critic Robert Ayers described Blackstock's "cheerful" work:

[It] would not be too much to claim this self-taught 66-year-old as something of a living civic treasure — an Audubon for our time and place. Blackstock's art, much like the great naturalist's, is founded on detailed observation, comparison and categorization, but whereas Audubon was able to occupy himself for years with his monumental "Birds of America" project, Blackstock reflects the contemporary world's demand that we make sense of many unrelated things at once.

The subjects of his paintings include examples of plant and animal life; tools, buildings, and vehicles; and other eclectic categories such as stringed instruments or mariners' knots. Blackstock researched topics at his local library, making use of reference works like encyclopedias to learn details about each subject. He also studied font types in order to write the title of the drawing in a style that would coordinate with the subject. He would begin his drawings with the handwritten title at the top, sketching objects in pencil, outlining in black marker, then using colored pencils to shade in each item before moving onto the next row of images.

British art historian Roger Cardinal noted the "autistic repetition" of Blackstock's art, claiming "[his] work represents a kind of stocktaking, the reflection of a yearning for order and perhaps ultimately of a longing for mastery over the unthinkable subtleties of our shared world — a desire for supremacy as chief overseer of reality's infinite variations."

== Exhibitions ==
Blackstock's work was first shown when he was 58 years old at a solo exhibition held by Garde Rail Gallery in Seattle. In 2011, the Collection de l'Art Brut in Lausanne held a solo exhibition of his work. Beginning in 2012, Blackstock was represented by Greg Kucera Gallery in Seattle, which featured him in several single-artist and contextualized thematic exhibitions. In 2021, an exhibit titled "The Incomplete Historical World, Parts I, II & III" featured limited-edition prints of his work which were a collaborative project between the artist, his family, and Greg Kucera Gallery.

== Institutional holdings and media ==
Blackstock's art is held in institutions such as the Blanton Museum of Art (Austin), Collection de l'Art Brut (Lausanne), and the Seattle Art Museum (Seattle).

A 22-minute documentary of his work titled Gregory Blackstock l'encyclopédiste was created for the 2011 exhibit of his work at the Collection de l'Art Brut. Another short video, The Great World of Gregory Blackstock, was created in 2021 and animated by Drew Christie as part of the PBS Voices series of documentary shorts. Some of his images were used for haute couture clothing by Comme des Garçons, and others were sold as greeting cards and jigsaw puzzles. A book of his work was published by Princeton Architectural Press in 2006 titled Blackstock's Collections: The Drawings of an Artistic Savant.

== Later life and death ==
Blackstock spent his later years living in an adult home in Lacey, Washington. Due to arthritis and cognitive decline, he was unable to draw for the last few years of his life. Blackstock died in Lacey on January 10, 2023. The obituary published by KING-TV described him as "Seattle's most original artist."
