= Outline of autism =

Overview of and topical guide to autism

The following outline is provided as an overview of and topical guide to autism:

Autism or autism spectrum disorder (ASD) – a condition characterized by differences or difficulties in social communication and interaction, a need or strong preference for predictability and routine, sensory processing differences, focused interests, or repetitive behaviors.

== Descriptions of autism ==
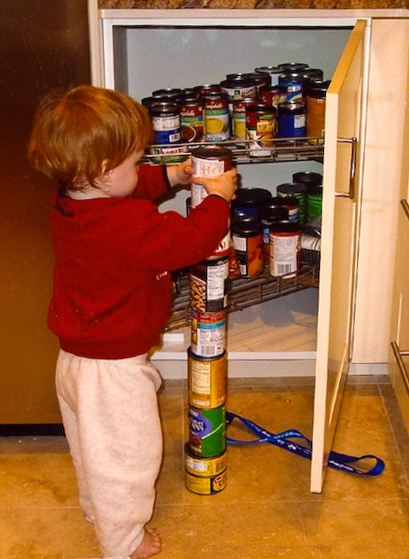
An autistic toddler stacking cans, sometimes associated with autism

Autism can be described as all of the following:

- Disability – may be physical, cognitive, mental, sensory, emotional, developmental or some combination of these.
  - Developmental disability – a term used in the United States and Canada to describe certain lifelong disabilities attributable to mental or physical impairments, manifested prior to adulthood.
- Disorder –
  - Developmental disorder – occur at some stage in a child's development, often slowing the development.
  - Neurodevelopmental disorder – or disorder of neural development, is an impairment of the growth and development of the brain or central nervous system.
  - Spectrum disorder
- A form of neurodiversity

== Autistic traits ==
Signs of autism are highly variable, and different individuals will have a different mix of traits. Some more common traits include:

- Avoidance of eye contact – preference to avoid eye contact and feelings of fear or being overwhelmed when looking into someone's eyes
- Developmental delay – slower acquisition of life skills
- Emotional dysregulation – mood swings, including outbursts when overwhelmed
- Executive dysfunction – difficulty staying organized, initiating tasks, and/or controlling impulses
- Picture thinking – visual thinking
- Routines – need for routine and fear of unexpected change
- Sensory processing disorder – over- or under-responsiveness to sensory input
- Sincerity – tendency to tell the truth
- Special interests – narrow and passionate areas of interest
- Stimming – repetitive movements or sounds that stimulate the senses and regulate emotion and sensory processing

== Research areas ==
=== Assessment tools ===
A peer reviewed article in 2025 suggests that a strengths based (neuroaffirmative approach) "Strengths-based neuropsychology assessments, grounded in a neurodiversity-positive framework, were acceptable for adult inpatient participants recently diagnosed with Autism."

- Autism Diagnostic Observation Schedule – an instrument for diagnosing and assessing Autism.
- Autism Diagnostic Interview
- Autism-spectrum quotient – AQ, is a questionnaire published in 2001 by Simon Baron-Cohen and his colleagues at the Autism Research Centre in Cambridge, UK.
- Autism Treatment Evaluation Checklist
- Checklist for Autism in Toddlers
- Childhood Autism Rating Scale
- Childhood Autism Spectrum Test
- Gilliam Asperger's disorder scale
- Modified Checklist for Autism in Toddlers
- Ritvo Autism and Asperger Diagnostic Scale

=== Research areas and subjects ===
- Double empathy problem – a theory suggesting that the communication difficulties present in autistic individuals are due to a reciprocal lack of understanding and bidirectional differences in communication style among other factors rather than an inherent deficiency.
- Epidemiology of autism – the study of factors affecting autism spectrum disorder (ASD).
- Epigenetics of autism – the study of epigenetic effects in ASD.
- Mirror neuron – a neuron that fires both when an animal acts and when the animal observes the same action performed by another.
- Motor differences in autism
- Spindle neuron – also called von Economo neurons (VENs), are a specific class of neurons that are characterized by a large spindle-shaped soma, gradually tapering into a single apical axon in one direction, with only a single dendrite facing opposite.
- Weak central coherence theory (WCC) – also called the central coherence theory (CC), suggests that a specific perceptual-cognitive style, loosely described as a limited ability to understand context or to "see the big picture", is the central characteristic of autism.

== Controversies ==
- Applied behavior analysis (ABA) – an operant-conditioning system most commonly used to modify the behavior of autistic people, which some (including many autistic people who have undergone it) have argued is abusive, traumatizing, dehumanizing, pseudoscientific and not genuinely collaborative or supportive. It was popularized by UCLA psychologist Ole Ivar Lovaas, who at times used electric shocks and other physical punishments on his child test subjects and once stated autistic people were human in physical form only and needed to be psychologically constructed. Lovaas was also influential in the formal development of conversion therapy, which utilized many of the same operant-conditioning methods (including physical punishment) as ABA.
- Autism's False Prophets – written by vaccine expert Paul Offit.
- Autism Speaks – the world's largest autism advocacy organization that sponsors autism research and conducts awareness and outreach activities aimed at families, governments, and the public. It is controversial (among other reasons) due to its previous focus on searching for a cure (and continuing investment in genetic research), previous support for the debunked belief that vaccines make children autistic, previous portrayals of autistic people as diseased and broken, failure to include a significant number of autistic people in leadership, support of applied behavior analysis, spending very little of the money it raises to provide tangible support to the autistic community and tendency to ignore, antagonize or speak over autistic people with differing views.
- Gluten-free, casein-free diet – diet that eliminates dietary intake of gluten and casein.
- Mother Warriors – written by actor and anti-vaccine activist Jenny McCarthy.
- Refrigerator mother – an accusing label for mothers of children diagnosed with autism or schizophrenia, now widely understood to be a myth.
- Barber National Institute – a pro-ABA non-profit organization that is prominent in the US state of Pennsylvania.
- Claims about Tylenol (generic name paracetamol or acetaminophen), being the cause of autism:
  - by Donald Trump;
  - by Robert F. Kennedy Jr.;
  - by lawsuit;
    - Acetaminophen autism mass tort;
    - Consumer-protection lawsuit against Johnson & Johnson and Kenvue by Texas Attorney General

=== Pseudoscience and disproven treatments ===
- Autistic enterocolitis – other studies have explicitly refuted its existence.
- Craniosacral therapy – (also called CST, also spelled Cranial Sacral bodywork or therapy) is an alternative medicine therapy used by physiotherapists, osteopaths, massage therapists, naturopaths, and chiropractors.
- Chelation therapy – the administration of chelating agents to remove heavy metals from the body. Not effective in autism.
- Facilitated communication – a debunked technique which purports to allow non-verbal autistics to communicate.
- Hyperbaric oxygen therapy – the medical use of oxygen at a level higher than atmospheric pressure.
- Secretin – a hormone that controls the secretions into the duodenum, and also separately, water homeostasis throughout the body. Ineffective in autism.
- Vaccines and autism – the thoroughly debunked claim that vaccines cause autism.
  - MMR vaccine and autism – was a case of scientific misconduct which triggered a health scare.
  - Thiomersal and vaccines – describing discredited claims that vaccines containing the mercury-based preservative thiomersal contribute to the development of autism and other developmental disorders.

== Notable autistic people ==
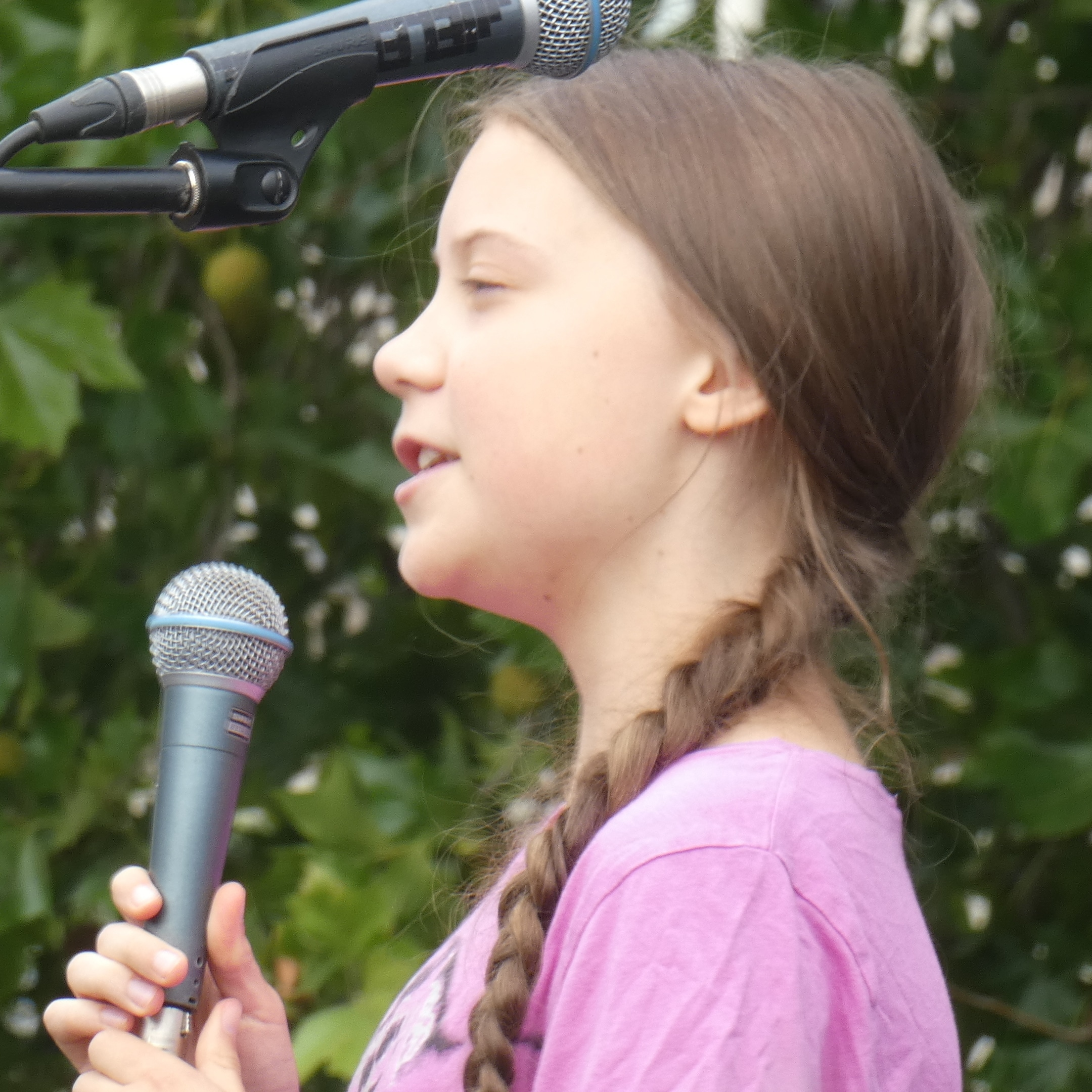
Greta Thunberg in 2019

- Susan Boyle (b. 1961) was first seen on Britain's Got Talent when she sang "I Dreamed a Dream" from Les Misérables. She has since become a successful singer and has mentioned how alive it makes her feel. She has also stated that her autism diagnosis came as a "relief" to her.
- Michelle Dawson (b. 1961) is a Canadian autism researcher.
- Temple Grandin (b. 1947) is an American doctor of animal science and professor at Colorado State University, bestselling author, and consultant to the livestock industry on animal behavior.
- Chloé Hayden (b. 1997) is an Australian actor, activist, author and internet personality. Hayden is AuDHD (autistic and ADHD). In 2022, she began co-starring as autistic character Quinni Gallagher-Jones on the Netflix TV series Heartbreak High, a role she provides input on based on her lived experience.
- Anthony Hopkins (b. 1937) is a Welsh actor who is the first openly autistic actor to win an Academy Award.
- Chris Packham (b. 1961) is an English naturalist, author, nature photographer and television presenter.
- Bella Ramsey (b. 2003) is an English actor best known for their work on Game of Thrones and The Last of Us (the HBO TV adaptions of the popular book and video-game series, respectively). They first publicly spoke about being diagnosed autistic and exploring their autistic identity in the April 2025 edition of British Vogue.
- Jim Sinclair (activist) is an autism rights activist who wrote the landmark essay "Don't Mourn For Us".
- Greta Thunberg (b. 2003) is a Swedish climate change activist.
- Donna Williams (1963–2017) was a best-selling Australian author, artist, singer-songwriter, screenwriter and sculptor diagnosed with autism after being assessed as a psychotic infant in 1965 at age two, tested multiple times for deafness and labeled disturbed throughout childhood, before treatment for gut, immune and sensory perceptual disorders in adulthood.

=== See also ===
- List of fictional autistic characters – fictional characters who have been confirmed to be autistic.

== Culture ==
- Autistic art – art created by autistic artists or art which captures or conveys a variety of autistic experiences or demeanor.
- Global perceptions of autism − an overview of the diagnosis, treatment, and experience of autism in developing nations.
- Identity-first language − the practice of using disability-related words as regular adjectives, such as saying "autistic person" rather than "person with autism".
- Neurodiversity – the standpoint that atypical neurological development is a normal human difference that should be accommodated instead of rejected.
  - Autism rights movement (ARM) – (a subset of the neurodiversity movement, also known as the anti-cure movement or autistic culture movement) is a social movement that encourages autistic people, their caregivers and society to adopt a position of neurodiversity, accepting autism as a variation in functioning rather than a mental disorder to be cured.
- Neurotypical – (or NT) is a term that was coined in the autistic community as a label for non-autistic people who have no brain-related health conditions or disabilities: specifically, neurotypical people have neurological development and states that are consistent with what most people would perceive as normal, particularly with respect to their ability to process linguistic information and social cues.
- Social model of disability – the view that disability is caused by societal failure to accommodate human diversity, rather than by a defect in the individual.
- Societal and cultural aspects of autism – come into play with recognition of autism, approaches to its support services and therapies, and how autism affects how we define personhood.

== Legislation ==
- Autism Act 2009 – a UK act that makes provision about the needs of autistic adults
- Children's Health Act – a US act that increased research and treatment of health issues, including autism, asthma, and epilepsy, in children
- Combating Autism Act – a US act that authorized funding into autism; renamed after controversy
- Jonathan's Law – a New York State act meant to curtail abuse in care facilities, named in honor of Jonathan Carey, a nonverbal autistic child who was killed by a direct care worker employed at the state-run facility where he lived

== Organizations, stakeholder groups and events ==
=== Organizations ===
- Aspies For Freedom (AFF) – a solidarity and campaigning group which aims at raising public awareness of the autism rights movement.
- Autism Awareness Campaign UK –
- Autism Network International – founded and run by autistic people.
- Autism Resource Centre (Singapore) – non-profit organization focused on autistic people.
- Autism Society of America (ASA) – controversial, primarily parent-led advocacy group founded in 1965 by Bernard Rimland, Ruth C. Sullivan and others.
- Autistic Self Advocacy Network – a nonprofit advocacy organization run by and for autistic people.
- M.I.N.D. Institute – research and treatment center.
- National Autistic Society (NAS) – a British charity for autistic people.
- Sacar (charity) – a charity focusing on autistic people.
- TreeHouse – a school in the United Kingdom that focuses on educating autistic children.
- Wrong Planet – an online community designed for autistic and other neurodivergent people. There are forums and discussions to help neurodivergent people with daily life and the struggles that come with it, such as making friends, general socialization and tips for going to overwhelming places. (Sometimes referred to by its URL, WrongPlanet.net)

=== Events ===
- Autism Sunday – also known as the International Day of Prayer for Autism and Asperger syndrome, is observed annually on the second Sunday of February.
- Autistic Pride Day – an annual pride celebration, organized by and for autistic people, held on June 18.
- Autreat – founded by members of ANI, this is a yearly gathering for autistic people along with parents and professionals to meet and share ideas in an autism-friendly environment.
- World Autism Awareness Day – an internationally recognized day that aims to raise global awareness of autism, held on April 2.

=== Other ===
- Children of the Stars – documentary
- Sensory friendly

== Therapies and interventions ==
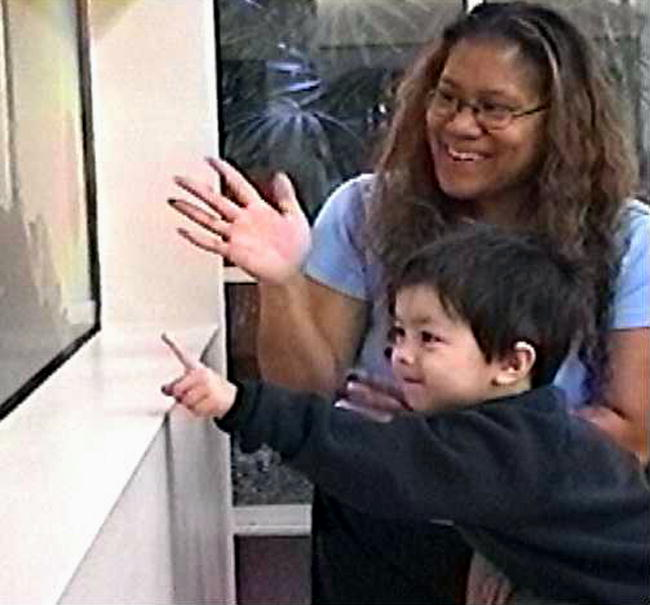
An autistic child and their older companion enjoying an aquarium

- Cognitive behavior therapy – a therapy to help with thought distortions.
- Dialectical behavior therapy – a therapy that works on emotion regulation and social skills, originally developed for people with borderline personality disorder.
- Hug machine – hug box, a squeeze machine, or a squeeze box, is a deep-pressure device designed to calm hyper-sensitive persons, usually autistic people.
- Pivotal response therapy (PRT) – a form of ABA (also referred to as pivotal response treatment or pivotal response training).
- Speech therapy – therapy to improve speaking skills.

=== Medications and supplements ===
- Risperidone – (Risperdal, and generics) is a second-generation or atypical antipsychotic.

=== Considerations ===
- Ethical challenges to autism treatment

== Associated and possibly associated conditions ==
=== Suspected genetic relations ===
- Fragile X syndrome (FXS) – (also Martin-Bell syndrome, or Escalante's syndrome), is a genetic syndrome suspected to be a genetic cause of autism in some cases
- Isodicentric 15 – a genetic variation involving extra genetic material in chromosome 15.
- Rett syndrome – a genetic disorder that almost exclusively affects those assigned female at birth, previously considered to be a form of autism. It was entirely removed from the Diagnostic and Statistical Manual of Mental Disorders (DSM) with the release of the DSM-5 in 2013.

=== Comorbid conditions ===
These are conditions that autistic people may experience more often than is typical.

- Alexithymia – a term coined by psychotherapist Peter Sifneos in 1973 to describe a state of deficiency in understanding, processing, or describing emotions.
- Attention deficit hyperactivity disorder (ADHD) – a condition with three subtypes: hyperactive, inattentive, and combined.
- Clinical depression – a mental illness involving low mood and fatigue.
- Coeliac disease – spelled celiac disease in North America and often celiac sprue, is an autoimmune disorder of the small intestine that occurs in genetically predisposed people of all ages from middle infancy onward.
- Communication disorder – a speech and language disorder which refers to problems in communication and in related areas such as oral motor function.
- Deafness – or hearing impairment, is a partial or total inability to hear where the ability would usually be expected.
- Developmental coordination disorder – a disorder involving motor skill impairments.
- Echolalia – the automatic repetition of vocalizations made by another person.
- Erotophobia – a term coined by a number of researchers in the late 1970s and early 1980s to describe one pole on a continuum of attitudes and beliefs about sexuality.
- Hyperlexia – the precocious ability to read words without prior training in learning to read typically before the age of 5.
- Inflammatory bowel disease (IBD) – a group of inflammatory conditions of the colon and small intestine.
  - Crohn's disease (CD) – which causes a similar disease, Johne's disease, in cattle.
- Intellectual disability – a generalized disorder appearing before adulthood, characterized by significantly impaired cognitive functioning and deficits in two or more adaptive behaviors.
- Language delay – slow development of language abilities compared to the usual developmental timetable.
- Learning disability – a classification including several areas of functioning in which a person has difficulty learning in a typical manner, usually caused by an unknown factor or factors.
  - Dyscalculia – a specific learning disability involving innate difficulty in learning or comprehending arithmetic.
  - Dysgraphia – a deficiency in the ability to write primarily in terms of handwriting, but also in terms of coherence.
  - Dyslexia – a very broad term defining a learning disability that impairs a person's fluency or comprehension accuracy in being able to read, and which can manifest itself as a difficulty with phonological awareness, phonological decoding, orthographic coding, auditory short-term memory, or rapid naming.
- Multiple-complex Developmental Disorder –
- Multisystem Developmental Disorder –
- Nonverbal learning disorder – or nonverbal learning disability (NLD or NVLD) is a condition characterized by a significant discrepancy between higher verbal and lower motor, visuo-spatial, and social skills on an IQ test.
- Obsessive Compulsive Disorder – an anxiety disorder characterized by obsessive thoughts and compulsive behavior that temporarily eases anxiety.
- Pyroluria – involves hypothetical excessive levels of pyrroles in the body resulting from improper hemoglobin synthesis.
- Sensory processing disorder – a disorder characterized by a sensory integration deficit.
- Sensory defensiveness – a condition defined as having "a tendency to react negatively or with alarm to sensory input which is generally considered harmless or non-irritating" to neurotypical persons.
- Sensory overload – related to cognitive load in general, is a condition where one or more of the senses are strained and it becomes difficult to focus on the task at hand.
- Social alienation – estrangement, division, or distancing of people from each other, or of people from what is important or meaningful to them, or of a person from their own sense of self.
- Social communication disorder – a condition similar to autism that involves difficulty with written language.
- Tourette syndrome – a disorder characterized by repetitive motor and vocal tics.

=== Obsolete autism spectrum disorders ===
Disorders formerly considered distinct, but now diagnosed as autism spectrum disorder, include:

- Asperger syndrome – a previously diagnosed form of autism often applied to autistic people with no communication delays or co-occurring intellectual disabilities. It was removed from the DSM in 2013 and the International Statistical Classification of Diseases and Related Health Problems (ICD) in 2022. Those who previously would have been diagnosed with that label under the prior revisions of the DSM and ICD are now diagnosed with Autism Spectrum Disorder. Some autistic people still unofficially use the Asperger (or "Aspie") label to refer to themselves or others because it was the label they were originally given, they do not believe they have enough in common with other autistic people to share a label with them, they feel the label is less stigmatizing or they feel the label has unique cultural value. However, it is also considered an offensive label by many autistic people due to its historically ableist and hierarchal use (e.g., portraying those with the label as more normal, capable or useful to society than other autistic people), the false perception that those with the label do not require support or accommodation and the fact that its namesake was a eugenicist and Nazi collaborator who was complicit in the deaths of autistic children.
- Childhood disintegrative disorder (CDD) – a condition in which a child experiences developmental regression.
- Classic autism - (or Kanner's syndrome) the first described form of autism written about in 1943.
- Pervasive developmental disorder (PDD) – as opposed to specific developmental disorders (SDD), refers to a group of five disorders characterized by delays in the development of multiple basic functions including socialization and communication.
- Pervasive developmental disorder not otherwise specified – (PDD-NOS) was a pervasive developmental disorder, and is also considered an autism spectrum disorder. It was diagnosed when deficits in social interaction and verbal/nonverbal communication or stereotyped, repetitive behaviors and interests were present but criteria was not met for a specific PDD.

== See also ==
- Mechanism of autism
- Causes of autism
- Violence and autism
