= Sacar =

Sacar may refer to:

- Sacar (charity), a charity in the United Kingdom
- Sacara nigripalpis, a synonym for the moth genus Aventiola
- Sacar or Sachar, a biblical name
- Sacar, editor of About Woman, a compilation of writings by Sri Nolini Kanta Gupta
- Sacar Anim (born 1997), American basketball player in the Israeli Basketball Premier League

== See also ==
- Sacario, American rapper and songwriter
