= Body-to-body communication =

Way of communicating with others

Body-to-body communication is a way of communicating with others through the use of nonverbal communication, without using speech or verbalization. It can include body language, facial expressions, and other bodily gestures in order to communicate with others without the need of verbal communication. Body-to-body communication accounts for postures, body language, physical touch, nonverbal language, and other bodily gestures.

This form of communication accounts for roughly up to sixty percent of human conversation and can be expressed in many different forms. Body-to-body communication is used in collaboration with, as well as in replacement of verbal communication to emphasize the point being made. Body-to-body communication is also used by people subconsciously more than consciously at times.

Human communication consists of both verbal and nonverbal interaction between two or more individuals. Nonverbal communication enhances human communication as a whole in a variety of ways and is an important aspect of social interactions between humans. Nonverbal responses are known to be immediate and honest. Based on studies, body movement and bodily gestures are considered the exact dominant behavior that defines nonverbal communication.

== Non-verbal Communication ==
Non-verbal cues are just as important as the verbal cues. Even though one is not talking, one can still continue to communicate through bodily expressions. From the tone of voice, to the way people cross arms these all convey a message. Verbal communication expresses thoughts but, nonverbal communication expresses inner feelings and thoughts more realistically. Body Language gives very important hints of people's feelings and thoughts at a moment of making a decision. Gesture is not only communicative but it is an integral part of humans beings. This is endorsed by observations of those blind from birth, who gesture in a similar manner as people with sight, even if the other person is also blind.

Clues of nonverbal language are controlled and activated by the limbic system in the brain. This is the part of the brain that reacts instantaneously, automatically and in real time. Because this is the part of the brain in charge of survival, it never rests and always remains on. This is the control center of emotions in which signals are shot to other parts of the brain, which assembles groups of behaviors that can be observed and decoded as they manifest into nonverbal language. These reactions occur without thinking and due to this, it is believed that these reactions are truly genuine. Because limbic responses of survival are intertwined in the autonomous nervous system, it is very difficult to hide them.

== People With Disabilities ==
Nonverbal communication gives people who lack the ability to communicate verbally the ability to express things that otherwise could not be expressed verbally, which makes it easier to identify and understand their disorder. People with autism often have difficulty with both verbal and nonverbal communication. Autistic people have trouble reading social cues and are often unresponsive to bodily messages and to their environment. Major depression give messages of distress such as loss of energy, sleep disturbances, difficulty concentrating, and lack of motivation to signify their mental situation.

== Sports ==
Body-to-body communication is utilized in sports to convey different types of messages from one player to another or from a coach to a player. These messages can be emotional and or informational. In sports a lot of emotion is expressed during a game whether they are good or bad. When players are upset with another they may use physical aggression to express their anger or issue with the other player. For instance, committing an intentional hard foul on someone in order to send that message nonverbally. In addition when good emotion is expressed from player top player or from player to they will give them a smack or tap on the butt which is a substitute for saying "good job." Also, in sports body-to-body communication is used to send informational messages. When coaches are trying to coach their players, they may perform the action or skill on someone to get a coaching point across. Body-to-body communication is used throughout sports more than most people know.

== Professional Settings ==
Most work places have either written or understood rules about what body-to-body communication is appropriate and what is not. Nonverbal communication is utilized in a professional setting by adding assertion what is said verbally or by replacing verbal communication when it is not possible to verbalize something. Visual communication in the workplace, such as bodily cues and facial expressions, paired with verbal communication and knowledge vocalization can create an attitude of assertion and improve professional behavior. Humans have many ways to express non-verbally. For example, with posture, clothes, make-up, and colors. Image Counsellors take this into account when transforming a client's appearance, with the purpose of transmitting a message. For this reason, in a professional setting, one is advised to dress a certain way. Dressing properly can communicate: professionalism, and experience. Sometimes humans will give off signs that will highlight confirmatory facts that otherwise can remain unapparent through the use of body communication. If an individual wishes for his message to be conveyed, he must mobilize his activity so that his message can be expressed during the interaction. For example, if an individual wishes to give the impression of being sure of their judgement, they will forgo the moment of thought. Instead, this individual will give an immediate decision which will demonstrate the audience that he is sure of his judgement. This is a practice that is used by many professionals such as lawyers, policemen, and doctors use in their work settings.

== Disadvantages ==
Nonverbal communication is not as precise and explanatory as verbal communication and thus can be vague or misleading to those who are receiving the communication. Because this way of communicating is so varied and has so many ways of being expressed, some meanings can become lost or misunderstood. It can become difficult to focus on the message being conveyed if more than one gesture is being expressed at the same time and some signals can be missed if one is focusing on another at the same time, causing confusion in the message. This type of communication also makes it difficult to change subjects or to go into detail about a subject without the use of verbal indication.

=== NLD (Nonverbal Learning Disorder) ===
Body-to-body communication is only helpful to those with the ability to read and understand another person's body language and communication. Nonverbal communication is not possible to use for those who lack the ability understand bodily communication, specifically people with a nonverbal learning disorder.

== Culture ==
Culture has a very significant impact on how people communicate, and this influences both verbal and nonverbal communication across cultures. The same way that people of different cultures speak in different languages, the use body language and nonverbal communication is very different across cultures and ethnic groups and only few nonverbal gestures have the same or a similar meaning universally. For example, bowing to a person indicates rank and status in Japan, but has little to no meaning in the United States. As for facial expressions, Asian cultures tend to suppress any facial expression whereas Mediterranean cultures exaggerate facial expressions when expressing sadness or anger. Although nonverbal communication is expressed differently across cultures, some is thought to be universal across cultures. This universal nonverbal language is thought to encompass human emotions, such as sadness, grief, anger, happiness, etc.

A culture is a shared system of socially transmitted behavior passed on from previous generations that describes, defines, and guides people's ways of life. Culture can influence nonverbal communication in many ways. The same gestures in different countries can have distinct meaning. For example, the American A-OK sign can have an obscene meaning in many nations in Europe, having sexual implications. Facial expression is another mean of nonverbal communication that culture affects. Humans have the ability to express emotions through facial expressions. Cultural display rules are learned during childhood and plays a big part on how people from different cultures manage and modify their emotional expressions depending on the social situation that they are in. In an experiment done by Ekman and Friesen; results showed that Japanese people are more likely to disguise their negative emotions in the presence of other people, where Americans will not.
