= MCDD =

MCDD may refer to:

- Multiple complex developmental disorder
- McDonnell Douglas
