= Prognosis of autism =

There is no evidence of a cure for autism. The degree of symptoms can decrease, occasionally to the extent that people lose their diagnosis of autism; this occurs sometimes after intensive treatment and sometimes not. It is not known how often this outcome happens, with reported rates in unselected samples ranging from 3% to 25%. Although core difficulties tend to persist, symptoms often become less severe with age. Acquiring language before age six, having an IQ above 50, and having a marketable skill all predict better outcomes; independent living is unlikely in autistic people with higher support needs.

== Developmental course ==
There are two possible developmental courses of autism. One course of development is more gradual in nature, with symptoms appearing fairly early in life and persisting. A second course of development is characterized by normal or near-normal development before onset of regression or loss of skills, which is known as regressive autism.

=== Gradual autism development ===
Most parents report that the onset of autism features appear within the first or second year of life. This course of development is fairly gradual, in that parents typically report concerns in development over the first two years of life and diagnosis can be made around 3–4 years of age. Overt features gradually begin after the age of six months, become established by age two or three years, and tend to continue through adulthood, although often in more muted form. Some of the early signs of autism in this course include decreased attention at faces, failure to obviously respond when name is called, failure to show interests by showing or pointing, and delayed imaginative play.

=== Regressive autism development ===
Regressive autism occurs when a child appears to develop typically but then starts to lose speech and social skills and is subsequently diagnosed with ASD. Other terms used to describe regression in children with autism are autism with regression, autistic regression, setback-type autism, and acquired autistic syndrome.

Within the regressive autism developmental course, there are two patterns. The first pattern is when developmental losses occur in the first 15 months to 3 years. The second pattern, childhood disintegrative disorder (a diagnosis now included under ASD in the DSM, but not the ICD), is characterized by regression after normal development in the first 3 to 4, or even up to 9 years of life.

After the regression, the child follows the standard pattern of autistic neurological development. The term regressive autism refers to the appearance that neurological development has reversed; it is actually only the affected developmental skills, rather than the neurology as a whole, that regresses.

Usually, the apparent onset of regressive autism can be surprising and distressing to parents, who often initially suspect severe hearing loss. Attribution of regression to environmental stress factors may result in a delay in diagnosis.

There is no standard definition for regression. Some children show a mixture of features, with some early delays and some later losses; and there is evidence of a continuous spectrum of behaviors, rather than, or in addition to, a black-and-white distinction, between autism with and without regression. There are several intermediate types of development, which do not neatly fit into either the traditional early onset or the regressive categories, including mixtures of early deficits, failures to progress, subtle diminishment, and obvious losses.

Regression may occur in a variety of domains, including communication, social, cognitive, and self-help skills; however, the most common regression is loss of language. Some children lose social development instead of language; some lose both. Skill loss may be quite rapid, or may be slow and preceded by a lengthy period of no skill progression; the loss may be accompanied by reduced social play or increased irritability. The temporarily acquired skills typically amount to a few words of spoken language, and may include some rudimentary social perception.

The prevalence of regression varies depending on the definition used. If regression is defined strictly to require loss of language, it is less common; if defined more broadly, to include cases where language is preserved but social interaction is diminished, it is more common. Although regressive autism is often thought to be less common (compared with gradual course of autism onset described above), this remains an area of ongoing debate; some evidence suggests that a pattern of regressive autism may be more common than previously thought. There are some who believe that regressive autism is simply early-onset autism which was recognized at a later date. Researchers have conducted studies to determine whether regressive autism is a distinct subset of ASD, but the results of these studies have contradicted one another.

=== Differential outcomes ===
There continues to be a debate over the differential outcomes based on these two developmental courses. Some studies suggest that regression is associated with poorer outcomes and others report no differences between those with early gradual onset and those who experience a regression period. While there is conflicting evidence surrounding language outcomes in autism, some studies have shown that cognitive and language abilities at age 2 1/2 may help predict language proficiency and production after age 5. Overall, the literature stresses the importance of early intervention in achieving positive longitudinal outcomes.

== Academic performance ==
The number of students identified and served as eligible for autism services in the United States has increased from 5,413 children in 1991–1992 to 370,011 children in the 2010–2011 academic school year. The United States Department of Health and Human Services reported approximately 1 in 68 children are diagnosed with autism at age 8, and onset is typically between ages 2 and 4.

The increasing number of students diagnosed with autism in the schools presents significant challenges to teachers, school psychologists, and other school professionals. These challenges include developing a consistent practice that best supports the social and cognitive development of the increasing number of autistic students. Although there is considerable research addressing assessment, identification, and support services for autistic children, there is a need for further research focused on these topics within the school context. Further research on appropriate support services for students with ASD will provide school psychologists and other education professionals with specific directions for advocacy and service delivery that aim to enhance school outcomes for students with ASD.

Attempts to identify and use best intervention practices for students with autism also pose a challenge due to over dependence on popular or well-known interventions and curricula. Some evidence suggests that although these interventions work for some students, there remains a lack of specificity for which type of student, under what environmental conditions (one-on-one, specialized instruction or general education) and for which targeted deficits they work best. More research is needed to identify what assessment methods are most effective for identifying the level of educational needs for students with ASD. Additionally, children living in higher resources settings in the United States tend to experience earlier ASD interventions than children in lower resource settings (e.g. rural areas).

A difficulty for academic performance in students with autism is the tendency to generalize learning. Learning is different for each student, which is the same for students with autism. To assist in learning, accommodations are commonly put into place for students with differing abilities. The existing schema of these students works in different ways and can be adjusted to best support the educational development for each student.

The cost of educating a student with autism in the US would be about $20,600 while educating an average student would be about $12,000.

Though much of the focus on early childhood intervention for autism has centered on high-income countries like the United States, some of the most significant unmet needs for autistic individuals are in low- and middle-income countries. In these contexts, research has been more limited but there is evidence to suggest that some comprehensive care plans can be successfully delivered by non-specialists in schools and in the community.

== Adulthood ==
Many autistic people face significant obstacles in transitioning to adulthood. Autistic people may face socialization issues, which may impact relationships such as community participation, employment, independent living, friendships, dating and marriage, and having children. Some autistic adults are vulnerable adults who are unable to live independently.

=== Employment ===
The majority of the economic burden of autism is caused by lost productivity in the job market. Compared to the general population, autistic people are more likely to be unemployed and to have never had a job. About half of people in their 20s with autism are not employed.

In various developed countries, the autism unemployment rate can range from 62% to as high as 85%, although in some it can be as low as 25%. While employers state hiring concerns about productivity and supervision, experienced employers of autistics give positive reports of above-average memory and detail orientation as well as a high regard for rules and procedure in autistic employees.

From the perspective of the social model of disability, much of this unemployment is caused by the lack of understanding from employers and coworkers. Adding content related to autism in existing diversity training can clarify misconceptions, support employees, and help provide new opportunities for autistic people. As of 2021, new autism employment initiatives by major employers in the United States continue to grow, as the initiative "Autism at Work" grew to 20 of the largest companies in the United States. However, special hiring programs remain largely limited to entry-level technology positions, such as software testing, and exclude those who have talents outside of technology. An alternative approach is systemic neurodiversity inclusion. Developing organizational systems with enough flexibility and fairness to include autistic employees improves the work experience of all employees.
