= Peter Szatmari =

Canadian autism researcher

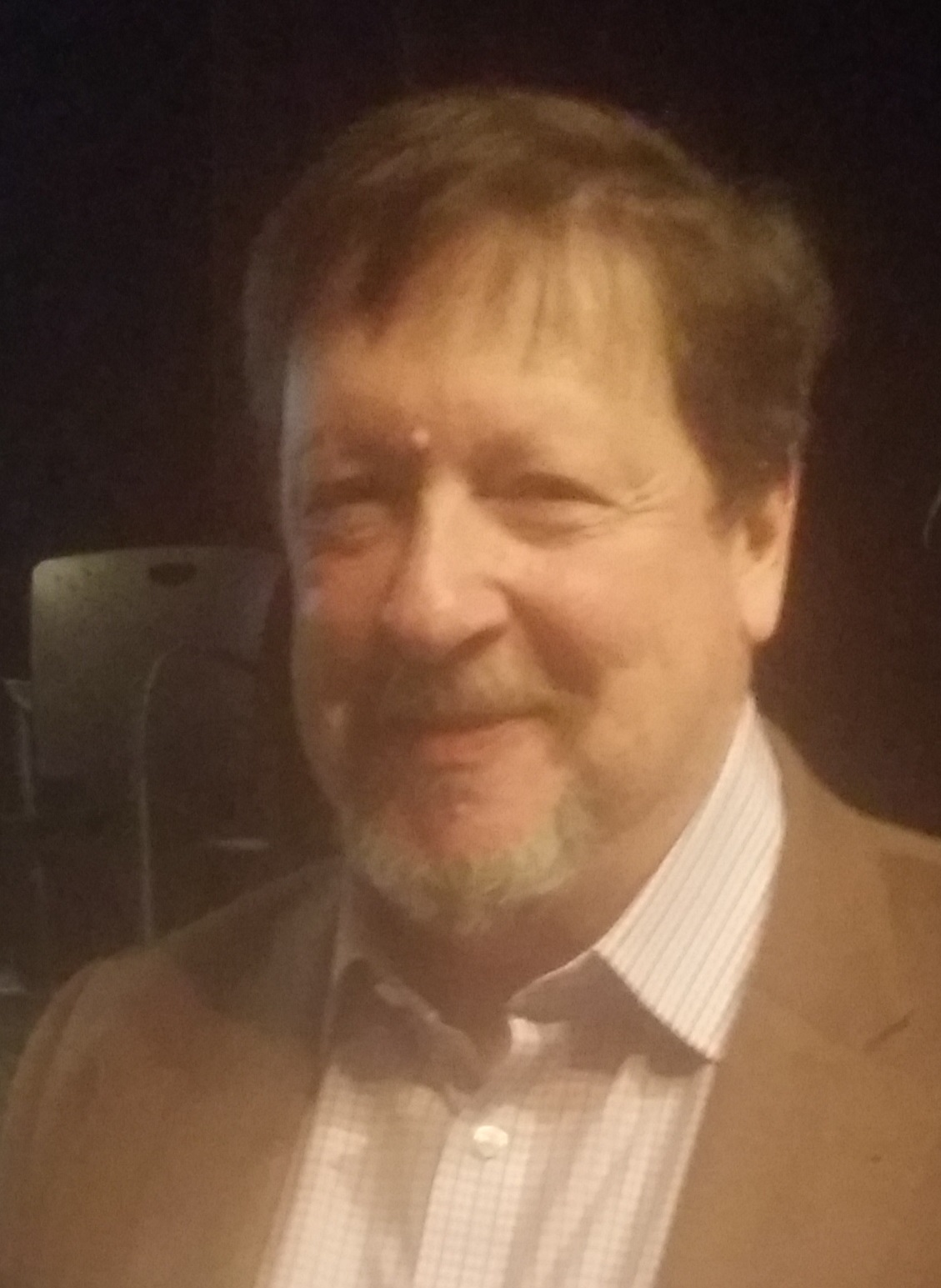
- Born: 1950 (age 75–76); Regina, Saskatchewan, Canada

Academic background
- Education: McMaster University

Peter Szatmari (born 1950) is a Canadian researcher of autism and Asperger syndrome.

== Education and career ==
Szatmari was born in Regina, Saskatchewan, and his family moved to Toronto in 1953. He attended the Upper Canada College before going to study at McMaster University, where he majored in philosophy and psychology. He went on to attend medical school at McMaster University and obtained his M.D. in 1976. He completed his residency training at the same institution with British psychiatrist David Charles Taylor.

From 1981 to 2013, Szatmari was employed at McMaster University as physician at the McMaster Children's Hospital and a faculty member at McMaster University, reaching the title of a Professor and Vice-Chair of Research at the Department of Psychiatry and Behavioural Neurosciences. He was also the director of the research training program in the department, and a member of the Offord Centre for Child Studies. Dr. Szatmari is Editor of the journal, Evidence-Based Mental Health, and serves on the editorial boards of several other journals. In 2013, Szatmari moved to the Hospital for Sick Children and the Centre for Addiction and Mental Health. He also became the director of the Division of Child and Youth Mental Health at the University of Toronto.

== Research ==
Szatmari is known for his writings on Aspergers genetics, infant studies, and PET and MRI studies. He is also known for his diagnostic criteria for Asperger syndrome.

Szatmari helped to set up the Pervasive Developmental Disorder (PDD) team at Chedoke Child and Family Centre, a regional diagnostic and treatment program for children with a PDD diagnosis, in Hamilton, Ontario.

Szatmari is currently part of the Autism Genome Project.

=== Diagnostic criteria for Asperger syndrome ===
Szatmari's diagnostic criteria were published in 1989 and cover five main areas: solitary (i.e. lack of friends), impaired social interaction (i.e. difficulty relating to others), impaired nonverbal communication (i.e. not understanding body language), odd speech patterns (i.e. different use of words), and that Asperger syndrome does not meet the criteria for autistic disorder as defined in the DSM-III-R.

Szatmari suggests that AS was promoted as a diagnosis to spark more research into the syndrome: "It was introduced into the official classification systems in 1994 and has grown in popularity as a diagnosis, even though its validity has not been clearly established. It was introduced not so much as an indication of its status as a 'true' disorder, but more to stimulate research ... its validity is very much in question."
