= Developmental regression =

Loss of developmental skills in children

Developmental regression occurs when a child who has reached certain developmental milestones begins to lose previously acquired milestones. It differs from global developmental delay in that a child experiencing developmental delay is either not reaching developmental milestones or not progressing to new developmental milestones, while a child experiencing developmental regression will lose milestones and skills after acquiring them. Developmental regression is associated with diagnoses of autism spectrum disorder, childhood disintegrative disorder, Rett syndrome, Landau-Kleffner syndrome, and neurodegenerative diseases. The loss of motor, language, and social skills can be treated with occupational therapy, physical therapy, and speech therapy.

== Associated diagnoses ==
Developmental regression is typically a symptom of neurological or neurodevelopmental disorder.

=== Autism spectrum disorder ===
Autism spectrum disorder is a developmental disorder in which a child's communication and social skills are affected. Children with autism spectrum disorder can experience a loss of their previously acquired language and social skills. This is often reported by the child's parents. Children can experience loss of vocabulary and language understanding, as well as no longer make eye contact or play social and imitative games when they previously had. They can also experience a loss of motor and basic skills like toileting or feeding themselves. In autism spectrum disorder, this regression occurs in the first few years of development.

=== Childhood disintegrative disorder ===
Childhood disintegrative disorder (CDD) is a developmental disorder where children experience a regression of social language, and motor functioning skills. CDD was merged with autism spectrum disorder in the DSM-5 in 2013. Children with CDD can experience a loss of expressive and receptive language skills, social and self-care skills, play skills, and/or motor skills. Regression commonly occurs at around 3 or 4 years old, but after at least 2 years of normal development and before age 10.

=== Rett syndrome ===
Rett syndrome is a neurodevelopmental disorder caused by a genetic mutation. It occurs almost exclusively in girls. A child with Rett syndrome experiences a loss of previously acquired intentional hand skills, and can experience a loss of language skills. Children can also experience a loss of social skills and autism-like symptoms. The regression typically occurs between 1 and 4 years old.

=== Landau-Kleffner syndrome ===
Landau-Kleffner syndrome (LKS) is a form of epilepsy associated with a loss of language skills. Those with LKS lose their ability to understand spoken language and to verbally express themselves. LKS typically has an onset between 2 and 8 years old.

=== Neuro-degenerative diseases ===
Neuro-degenerative diseases (disorders like Batten disease) can result in a child losing previously acquired motor, language, and speech skills.

== Signs and symptoms ==
Children with developmental regression lose developmental milestones they have previously gained. These can be motor, social, or language skills. The loss of motor skills could include loss of the ability to purposefully use hands, loss of the ability to feed oneself, loss of the ability to walk, loss of the ability to bathe oneself, and loss of the ability to dress oneself. The loss of social skills could include loss of the ability/desire to play, loss of the ability to make appropriate eye contact, and loss of interest in playing social games. The loss of language skills could include the loss of a child's ability to understand spoken speech and sounds (receptive language skills) and/or the loss of a child's ability to use words/spoken language (expressive language skills).

== Diagnosis ==
The American Academy of Pediatrics recommends that most children receive a developmental screening at their 9 month, 18 month, and 30 month physical exams. Physicians also screen children for autism spectrum disorder at their 18 month and 2 year appointments. If the screening indicates a potential problem, a physician would then perform a developmental evaluation to identify the specific developmental areas affected and assess the child's needs. Parents can also monitor their children and inform their provider if their child has lost previously reached developmental milestones.

== Treatment ==
For treatment of regression of motor skills, occupational and physical therapy can be used. Occupational therapy can help children regain some of their lost fine motor skills. An occupational therapist can help a child improve their fine motor skills and hand-eye coordination so they can complete basic life tasks like bathing or feeding themselves, and fine motor skill tasks like writing. Physical therapy can be used to treat regression of gross motor skills. Physical therapists can help a child with skills like walking or mobility issues.

Speech therapy is often used for treatment of regression of language skills. Speech therapists will help a child restore as much of their lost language skills as possible, and help a child learn to communicate, potentially with the use of communication aids.

Social skills training can be used to treat a regression of social skills. Children who receive social skills training are taught age-appropriate social skills like problem solving and peer interaction skills.

For regression related to seizures, medication can be used to treat the seizures.

== See also ==
- Developmental disorder
