= Childhood disintegrative disorder =

Neurodevelopmental condition

- Other names: Heller syndrome, disintegrative psychosis, dementia infantilis
- Specialty: Psychiatry, pediatrics
- Usual onset: 3–10 years old
- Duration: Lifelong
- Causes: Unknown
- Differential diagnosis: Regressive autism, Rett syndrome, lead poisoning, mercury poisoning, HIV infection, brain tumor, certain seizure disorders (e.g., Landau–Kleffner syndrome), and some neurodegenerative diseases (e.g., variant Creutzfeldt–Jakob disease)
- Frequency: 1.7 in 100,000

Childhood disintegrative disorder (CDD), also known as Heller syndrome and disintegrative psychosis, is a rare condition characterized by a late onset of developmental delays—or severe and sudden reversals—in language (receptive and expressive), social engagement, bowel and bladder, play and motor skills. Researchers have not been successful in finding a cause for this disorder. In May 2013, CDD was one of several subtypes of pervasive developmental disorder (PDD)—including Asperger's syndrome, classic autism, and pervasive developmental disorder not otherwise specified—that was subsumed into a single diagnostic term called "autism spectrum disorder" in the DSM-5 manual.

CDD was originally described by Austrian educator Theodor Heller (1869–1938) in 1908, 35 years before Leo Kanner and Hans Asperger described autism. Heller had previously used the name dementia infantilis for this disorder.

An apparent period of fairly normal development is often noted before regressions in skills occurs. The age at which this regression can occur varies, but regression after three years of normal development is typical. The regression, known as a prodrome, can be so dramatic that the child may be aware of it, and may in its beginning even ask, vocally, what is happening to them. Some children describe or appear to be reacting to hallucinations, but the most obvious symptom is that skills apparently attained are lost. Many children are already somewhat delayed when the disorder becomes apparent, but these delays are not always obvious in young children. Many writers have described the condition's impact as devastating, affecting both the family and the individual's future. As is the case with all PDD categories, there is considerable controversy about the right treatment for CDD.

== Signs and symptoms ==
CDD is a very rare condition, with only 1.7 cases per 100,000.

A child affected with childhood disintegrative disorder shows normal development initially. Up until at least three years old, the child has developed normally in the areas of language skills, social skills, comprehension skills, and has maintained those skills for about two years. However, between the ages of three and ten, these skills acquired are lost almost completely in at least two of the following six functional areas:

- Expressive language skills (being able to produce speech and communicate a message)
- Receptive language skills (comprehension of language – listening and understanding what is communicated)
- Social skills and self care skills
- Control over bowel and bladder
- Play skills
- Motor skills

Lack of normal function or impairment also occurs in at least two of the following three areas:

- Social interaction
- Communication
- Repetitive behavior and interest patterns

Most children with CDD regress to severe intellectual disability.

== Causes ==
All of the causes of childhood disintegrative disorder are still unknown. Sometimes CDD surfaces abruptly within days or weeks, while in other cases it develops over a longer period of time. A Mayo Clinic report indicates: "Comprehensive medical and neurological examinations in children diagnosed with childhood disintegrative disorder seldom uncover an underlying medical or neurological cause. Although the occurrence of epilepsy is higher in children with childhood disintegrative disorder, experts don't know whether epilepsy plays a role in causing the disorder."

CDD, especially in cases of later age of onset, has also been associated with certain other conditions, particularly the following:

- Lipid storage diseases: In this condition, a toxic buildup of excess fats (lipids) takes place in the brain and nervous system.
- Subacute sclerosing panencephalitis: Chronic infection of the brain by a form of the measles virus causes subacute sclerosing panencephalitis. This condition leads to brain inflammation and the death of nerve cells.
- Tuberous sclerosis (TSC): TSC is a genetic disorder. In this disorder, tumors may grow in the brain and other vital organs like kidneys, heart, eyes, lungs, and skin. In this condition, noncancerous (benign) tumors, hamartomas, grow in the brain.
- Leukodystrophy: In this condition, the myelin sheath does not develop in a normal way, causing white matter in the brain to eventually fail and disintegrate.
- Encephalitis: Encephalitis is inflammation of the brain sometimes caused by viral or bacterial infection, highlighting the importance of childhood vaccinations, especially in people with compromised immune systems.

== Treatment ==
Loss of language and skills related to social interaction and self-care are serious. The affected children face ongoing disabilities in certain areas and require long-term care. Treatment of CDD involves both behavior therapy, environmental therapy and medications.

- Behavior therapy: Applied behavior analysis (ABA) is considered to be the most effective form of treatment for autism spectrum disorders by the American Academy of Pediatrics. The primary goal of ABA is to improve quality of life, and independence by teaching adaptive behaviors to children with autism, and to diminish problematic behaviors like running away from home, or self-injury by using positive or negative reinforcement to encourage or discourage behaviors over time.
- Environmental therapy: Sensory enrichment therapy uses enrichment of the sensory experience to improve symptoms in autism, many of which are common to CDD.
- Medications: There are no medications available to directly treat CDD. Antipsychotic medications are used to treat severe behavior problems like aggressive stance and repetitive behavior patterns. Anticonvulsant medications are used to control seizures.

== See also ==
- Developmental regression
