= Children's Nonverbal Learning Disabilities Scale =

Children's Nonverbal Learning Disabilities Scale (C-NLD)
- Purpose: screens for the symptoms of nonverbal learning disabilities in children

The Children's Nonverbal Learning Disabilities Scale (C-NLD) is an assessment that screens for the symptoms for nonverbal learning disabilities in children, which can affect a child's visual spatial organization, motor abilities, and social interactions. All questions in the assessment are categorized in three headings: motor skills, visual-spatial skills, and interpersonal skills.

The C-NLD is a 15 question measure intended to be filled out by the parent or guardian of the child. Each of the 15 questions are answered based on a four-option Likert scale, containing "Never/Rarely", "Sometimes", "Often/Always", and "I don't know" answer choices. The scale contains three sections; the first section is designed to assess motor skills consists of 4 questions, the second section is designed to assess visual-spatial skills consists of 7 questions, and the last section assesses interpersonal skills and consists of 4 questions.

== Psychometric properties ==
=== Reliability ===
Evaluating scores from the Children's Nonverbal Learning Diasbilites Scale against the EBA rubric for norms and reliability
Criterion	Rating	Explanation with references
Norms	none available	psycinfo search "reliability" + "nonverbal learning disabilities scales"
Internal consistency	none available	psycinfo search "reliability" + "nonverbal learning disabilities scales"
Inter-rater reliability	none available	psycinfo search "reliability" + "nonverbal learning disabilities scales"
Test-retest reliability (stability)	none available	psycinfo search "reliability" + "nonverbal learning disabilities scales"
Repeatability	none available	psycinfo search "reliability" + "nonverbal learning disabilities scales"

=== Validity ===
Evaluation of validity and utility for the Children's Nonverbal Learning Diasbilites Scale
Criterion	Rating	Explanation with references
Content validity	none available	psycinfo search "validity" + "nonverbal learning disabilities scales"
Construct validity (e.g., predictive, concurrent, convergent, and discriminant validity)	none available	psycinfo search "validity" + "nonverbal learning disabilities scales"
Discriminative validity	none available	psycinfo search "validity" + "nonverbal learning disabilities scales"
Validity generalization	none available	psycinfo search "validity" + "nonverbal learning disabilities scales"
Treatment sensitivity	none available	psycinfo search "validity" + "nonverbal learning disabilities scales"
Clinical utility	none available	psycinfo search "validity" + "nonverbal learning disabilities scales"

== Interpretation ==
=== C-NLD Scoring ===
Non-verbal learning disorder includes multiple specific symptoms characterized into three specific areas: neuropsychological deficits (deficits with perception, psychomotor coordination, memory, reasoning, and aspects of speech), academic deficits (mathematical reasoning, reading comprehension, and comprehension of written language) and social-emotional/adaptational deficits (social awareness and difficulties in social interactions).

The C-NLD works as a primary screening measure, and referral to a neuropsychologist for further testing is advised if the parent C-NLD report indicates "sometimes" or "often" for over half of the items in each of the three sub-sections.

== See also ==
- Autism spectrum disorder
- Nonverbal learning disorder
