= Acetaminophen autism mass tort =

Failed legal action alleging a causal link between acetaminophen and autism

Acetaminophen autism mass tort refers to U.S. product-liability lawsuits alleging that in utero exposure to acetaminophen (also known as paracetamol and sold under brand names including Tylenol) increased the risk of autism spectrum disorder and/or attention deficit hyperactivity disorder (ADHD) in children. Many of the federal cases were centralized in multidistrict litigation (MDL) in the Southern District of New York, but the MDL was largely dismissed after the court excluded plaintiffs' general-causation experts under federal evidence standards, a decision that was later the subject of appellate review and continuing public controversy.

== Background ==
Acetaminophen is a widely used analgesic and antipyretic, including during pregnancy. Scientific research on prenatal acetaminophen exposure and neurodevelopmental outcomes has produced mixed findings, with some observational studies reporting associations and others finding no association once familial and confounding factors are addressed.

In 2025, the American College of Obstetricians and Gynecologists stated that evidence was insufficient to establish a causal relationship between acetaminophen use in pregnancy and neurodevelopmental outcomes, while advising clinicians and patients to use medications only as needed and as directed.

== Federal litigation ==
On October 5, 2022, the U.S. Judicial Panel on Multidistrict Litigation transferred some 66 autism and ADHD lawsuits to Senior District Judge Denise Cote in the Southern District of New York, thus consolidating all such acetaminophen cases in a mass tort. The case specifically concerns the lack of warning regarding in utero use. On November 19, Judge Cote, among other matters, ruled against Walmart's preemption argument (which is often raised in pharmaceutical mass tort cases). Judge Cote likewise ruled against Johnson & Johnson in April 2023. Given the significant media attention and advertising the class action has been receiving, the number of plaintiffs was widely anticipated to increase considerably.

The case was thrown out December 18, 2023, with Judge Cote writing in 148-page ruling "The unstructured approach adopted by the plaintiffs' experts permitted cherry-picking, allowed a results-driven analysis, and obscured the complexities, inconsistencies, and weaknesses in the underlying data..."

== Related state actions ==
In October 2025, the Texas Attorney General filed a consumer-protection lawsuit against Johnson & Johnson and Kenvue (which markets Tylenol in the U.S.), alleging deceptive marketing of acetaminophen as safe during pregnancy and asserting a link to autism and other developmental disorders; news coverage described the scientific link as unproven and noted that many related federal cases had been dismissed and were under appeal.

== See also ==
- Autism
- Attention deficit hyperactivity disorder
- Multidistrict litigation
