= Pervasive developmental disorder =

Developmental disorder; related to autism

- Specialty: Psychiatry, pediatrics, neuropsychology
- Symptoms: Developmental delay in multiple areas, particularly socialization and communication
- Usual onset: Early developmental period
- Duration: Lifelong
- Types: Classic autism, Asperger syndrome, PDD-NOS, childhood disintegrative disorder, Rett syndrome
- Treatment: Early childhood intervention, specialized educational programs and settings

The diagnostic category pervasive developmental disorders (PDD), as opposed to specific developmental disorders (SDD), was a group of disorders characterized by delays in the development of multiple basic functions including socialization and communication. It was defined by the Diagnostic and Statistical Manual of Mental Disorders (DSM) (from 1980 to 2013), and the International Classification of Diseases (ICD) (until 2025).

The pervasive developmental disorders included autism, Asperger syndrome, pervasive developmental disorder not otherwise specified (PDD-NOS), childhood disintegrative disorder (CDD), overactive disorder associated with intellectual disability and stereotyped movements, and Rett syndrome. As of the publication of the DSM-5 in 2013, the first four of these disorders are now known collectively as autism spectrum disorder; the last disorder is much rarer, and is sometimes placed on the autism spectrum and sometimes not.

The onset of pervasive developmental disorders occurs during infancy, but a specific condition is usually not identified until the child is around three years old. Parents may begin to question the health of their child when developmental milestones are not met, including age appropriate motor movement and speech production.

There is a division among doctors on the use of the term PDD. Many use the term PDD as a short way of saying PDD-NOS. Others diagnose the general category label of PDD because they are hesitant to diagnose very young children with a specific type of PDD, such as autism. Both approaches contribute to confusion about the term, because the term PDD is intended by its coiners and major bodies to refer to a category of disorders and not be used as a diagnostic label. The fifth edition of the DSM removed PDD as a category of diagnoses, and largely replaced it with ASD and a measure of the relative severity of the condition. The eleventh edition of the ICD also removed the category.

== Signs and symptoms ==
Symptoms of PDD may include behavioral and communication problems such as:

- Difficulty using and understanding language
- Difficulty relating to people, objects, and events; for example, lack of eye contact, pointing behavior, and lack of facial responses
- Unusual play with toys and other objects.
- Paranoia, a characteristic form of social anxiety, derealization, transient psychosis, and unconventional beliefs if environment or routine are changed without notice
- Repetitive body movements or behavior patterns, such as hand flapping, hair twirling, foot tapping, or more complex movements
- Difficulty regulating behaviors and emotions, which may result in temper tantrums, anxiety, and aggression
- Emotional breakdowns
- Delusional or unconventional perception of the world
- Maladaptive daydreaming

=== Degrees ===
Children with PDD vary widely in abilities, intelligence, and behaviors. Some children do not speak at all, others speak in limited phrases or conversations, and some have relatively normal language development. Repetitive play skills and limited social skills are generally evident. Unusual responses to sensory information—loud noises, lights—are common.

== Diagnosis ==
Diagnosis is usually made during early childhood. Individuals who received diagnoses based on the DSM-IV maintain their diagnosis under the autism spectrum disorders. However, an editorial published in the October 2012 issue of American Journal of Psychiatry notes that, while some doctors argue that there is insufficient evidence to support the diagnostic distinction between ASD and PDD, multiple literature reviews found that studies showing significant differences between the two disorders significantly outnumbered those that found no difference.

The World Health Organization's International Classification of Diseases, 10th edition (ICD-10) categorized PDD into five distinct subtypes, each with their own diagnostic criteria. The five subtypes, childhood autism, atypical autism, Rett syndrome, Asperger syndrome and childhood disintegrative disorder, are characterized by abnormalities in social interactions and communication.

The disorders were primarily diagnosed based on behavioral features, although the presence of any other medical conditions is important, it is not taken into account when making a diagnosis.

Before the release of the DSM-5, some clinicians used PDD-NOS as a "temporary" diagnosis for children under the age of five when, for whatever reason, they are reluctant to diagnose autism. There are several justifications for this. Very young children have limited social interaction and communication skills to begin with, so it can be difficult to correctly diagnose milder cases of autism in toddlers. The unspoken assumption is that by the age of five, unusual behaviors will either resolve or develop into diagnosable autism. However, some parents view the PDD label as no more than a euphemism for autism spectrum disorders, while the PDD label makes it more difficult to receive aid for early childhood intervention.

=== Classification ===
The pervasive developmental disorders were:

- Pervasive developmental disorder not otherwise specified (PDD-NOS), which includes atypical autism, and is the most common (47% of autism diagnoses);
- Typical autism, the best-known;
- Asperger syndrome (9% of autism diagnoses);
- Rett syndrome; and
- Childhood disintegrative disorder (CDD).

The first three of these disorders are commonly called the autism spectrum disorders; the last two disorders are much rarer, and are sometimes placed in the autism spectrum and sometimes not.

In May 2013, the Diagnostic and Statistical Manual–5th Edition (DSM-5) was released, updating the classification for pervasive developmental disorders. The grouping of disorders, including PDD-NOS, autism, Asperger syndrome, Rett syndrome, and CDD, has been removed and replaced with the general term of autism spectrum disorders (ASDs). The American Psychiatric Association has concluded that using the general diagnosis of ASD supports more accurate diagnoses. The grouping of these disorders into ASD also reflects that autism is characterized by common symptoms and should therefore bear a single diagnostic term. In order to distinguish between the different disorders, the DSM-5 employs severity levels. The severity levels take into account required support, restricted interests and repetitive behaviors, and deficits in social communication.

=== PDD and PDD-NOS ===
There is a division among doctors on the use of the term PDD. Many use the term PDD as a short way of saying PDD-NOS. Others use the general category because the term PDD actually refers to a category of disorders and is not a diagnostic label.

PDD is not itself a diagnosis, while PDD-NOS is a diagnosis. To further complicate the issue, PDD-NOS can also be referred to as "atypical personality development", "atypical PDD", or "atypical autism".

== Treatment ==
Medications are used to address certain behavioral problems; therapy for children with PDD should be specialized according to the child's specific needs.

Some children with PDD benefit from specialized classrooms in which the class size is small and instruction is given on a one-to-one basis. Others function well in standard special education classes or regular classes with support. Early intervention, including appropriate and specialized educational programs and support services, play a critical role in improving the outcome of individuals with PDD.

== See also ==
- Infantile neuroaxonal dystrophy
- Multiple complex developmental disorder
- Multisystem developmental disorder
