= Gilliam Asperger's disorder scale =

Diagnostic tool for Asperger syndrome

- Purpose: diagnosis of Asperger syndrome

The Gilliam Asperger's disorder scale (GADS) is a tool for assisting the diagnosis of Asperger syndrome. More specifically, it is a rating scale for behaviour, which can be used by either individuals or professionals, and is commonly used by school psychologists.

It comprises 32 diagnostic characteristics, divided into four sub-scales. The four sub-scales are Social Interaction, Restricted Patterns of Behaviour, Cognitive Patterns, and Pragmatic Skills. An optional additional sub-scale of eight items, Early Development, can also be included.

The rating scores on each of the sub-scales are combined by simple summation to form an overall score, the Asperger's disorder quotient.

Administering the test takes 10 minutes. The scale is available in forms for teachers as well as parents, and like the Gilliam Autism Rating Scale it is comparatively less complicated to administer and score than other tests such as the Autism Diagnostic Observation Schedule or the Autism Diagnostic Interview — Revised (although both of these more complex tests are increasingly used in research).
