= Multisystem developmental disorder =

Alternative diagnosis to autism

Multisystem developmental disorder (MSDD) is a term used by Stanley Greenspan to describe children under age 3 who exhibit signs of impaired communication as in autism, but with strong emotional attachments atypical of autism. It is described in the DC:0-3R manual as an optional diagnosis for children under two years of age.

== Other uses of the term ==
The term multisystem developmental disorder has also been used to describe various developmental disorders. These include:

- Alagille syndrome, an autosomal dominant disorder with a wide range of features and manifestations. Its five most significant features are chronic cholestasis, a condition where bile cannot flow from the liver to the duodenum, occurring in 95% of cases; heart abnormalities (over 90%); butterfly vertebrae; posterior embryotoxon and a distinctive face (prominent forehead, deep-set eyes, and a pointed chin).
- Rubinstein-Taybi syndrome, a syndrome characterized by broad thumbs, facial abnormalities, and big toes alongside moderate to severe intellectual disability.
- Williams syndrome, a neurodevelopmental disorder characterized by a unique profile of strengths and deficits; most with the condition have mild intellectual disability but have grammatical and lexical abilities above what would be expected from their IQs. They are hypersocial and empathetic, but social isolation is commonly experienced.
- Proteus syndrome, a congenital disorder causing disproportionate growth of skin, bone, and other tissues.
- Asphyxiating thoracic dysplasia, an autosomal recessive skeletal disorder with an estimated prevalence of between 1 in 100,000 and 1 in 130,000 live births.

== Symptoms ==
- Toe walking
- Pragmatic speech problems
- Clumsiness
- Obsessions and rituals
- Sensory issues
- Disinterest in social interaction
- Autistic characteristics
