= Pervasive developmental disorder not otherwise specified =

Pervasive developmental disorder not otherwise specified (PDD-NOS), (including atypical autism)
- Specialty: Clinical psychology, psychiatry, pediatrics, occupational medicine
- Usual onset: from birth

Pervasive developmental disorder not otherwise specified (PDD-NOS) is a historic psychiatric diagnosis first defined in 1980 that has since been incorporated into autism spectrum disorder in the DSM-5 (2013).

According to the earlier DSM-IV, PDD-NOS referred to "mild or severe pervasive deficits in the development of reciprocal social interaction and/or verbal and nonverbal communication skills, or when stereotyped behavior, interests, and/or activities are present, but the criteria are not met for a specific PDD" or for several other disorders.

PDD-NOS was one of four disorders collapsed into the diagnosis of autism spectrum disorder in the DSM-5, and also was one of the five disorders classified as a pervasive developmental disorder (PDD) in the DSM-IV. The ICD-10 equivalents also became part of its definition of autism spectrum disorder, as of the ICD-11.

PDD-NOS included atypical autism, a diagnosis defined in the ICD-10 for the case that the criteria for autistic disorder were not met because of late age of onset, or atypical symptomatology, or both of these.

Even though PDD-NOS was considered milder than typical autism, this was not always true. While some characteristics may be milder, others may be more severe.

== Signs and symptoms ==
It is common for individuals with PDD-NOS to have more intact social skills and a lower level of intellectual deficit than individuals with other PDDs. Characteristics of many individuals with PDD-NOS are:

- Communication difficulties (e.g., using and understanding language)
- Difficulty with social behavior
- Uneven skill development (strengths in some areas and delays in others)
- Unusual play with toys and other objects
- Repetitive body movements or behavior patterns
- Preoccupation with fantasies that interfere and that are not normal to have at a certain age depending on social, cultural and religious norms.
- Unconventional perception of the world

== Diagnosis ==
PDD-NOS is not a current part of the Diagnostic and Statistical Manual of Mental Disorders typology (as of the DSM-5), which is the most common diagnostic typology used in the United States. In the still-used (though deprecated) ICD-10, it is considered "atypical autism" and "pervasive developmental disorder, unspecified".

The diagnosis of a pervasive developmental disorder not otherwise specified was given to individuals with difficulties in the areas of social interaction, communication, and/or stereotypic behavior patterns or interests, but who did not meet the full DSM-IV criteria for autism or another PDD. This does not necessarily mean that PDD-NOS is a milder disability than the other PDDs. It could simply mean that individuals who receive this diagnosis do not meet the diagnostic criteria of the other PDDs, but that there is still a pervasive developmental disorder that affects the individual in the areas of communication, socialization, and behavior.

As for the other pervasive developmental disorders, the diagnosis of PDD-NOS required the involvement of a team of specialists. The individual needs to undergo a full diagnostic evaluation, including a thorough medical, social, adaptive, motor skills and communication history. Other parts of an assessment can be behavioral rating scales, direct behavioral observations, psychological assessment, educational assessment, communication assessment, and occupational assessment.

Description of PDD-NOS merely as a "subthreshold" category without a more specific case definition poses methodological problems for research regarding the relatively heterogeneous group of people who receive this diagnosis. While it is true that children diagnosed with PDD-NOS, as a whole, show fewer intellectual deficits and are higher-functioning than autistic children, many others who fit the criteria for PDD-NOS have some autistic features but also have intellectual deficits that are so severe that it is difficult or impossible to tell whether some of the deficits come from the autism or from the severe to profound degree of intellectual disability itself. Furthermore, some others who fit the criteria for PDD-NOS come to professional attention at a later age, compared to those diagnosed with autism.

=== Subgroups ===
In 2004, Walker et al. found that persons with PDD-NOS belonged to one of three very different subgroups:

- A high-functioning group (around 25 percent) whose symptoms more or less overlap with that of what was Asperger syndrome, while also not meeting the then current criteria for autism spectrum disorder, but who completely differ from those with Asperger syndrome in terms of having a lag in language development and/or mild cognitive impairment. (The criteria for Asperger syndrome excludes a speech delay or a cognitive delay in early life.)
- Another group (around 25 percent) whose symptoms more closely resemble those of autism, but do not fully meet all its diagnostic signs and symptoms. This is because either the symptoms were recognized at a later age or because they were too young or have cognitive deficits that are too severe to properly identify all the symptoms of autism that they may have.
- The biggest group (around 50 percent) consists of those who met all the diagnostic criteria for autistic disorder or Asperger's disorder but whose stereotypical and repetitive behaviors were noticeably mild.

== Treatment ==
There is no known cure for PDD-NOS, but there are interventions that can have a positive influence.

Some of the more common therapies and services include:

- Visual and environmental supports, visual schedules
- Social stories and comic strip conversations
- Speech therapy
- Physical and occupational therapy
