= Sacar (charity) =

UK charity

Sacar is a charity in Bradford, West Yorkshire, England, which seeks to support people with autism spectrum disorders.

It aims to enable people with Asperger syndrome or autism to lead a normal, independent life and to help them to integrate into the community.
