= Asperger syndrome =

Obsolete diagnostic class of autism

- Other names: Asperger's syndrome, Asperger disorder (AD), Asperger's, Sukhareva's syndrome, schizoid disorder of childhood, autistic psychopathy
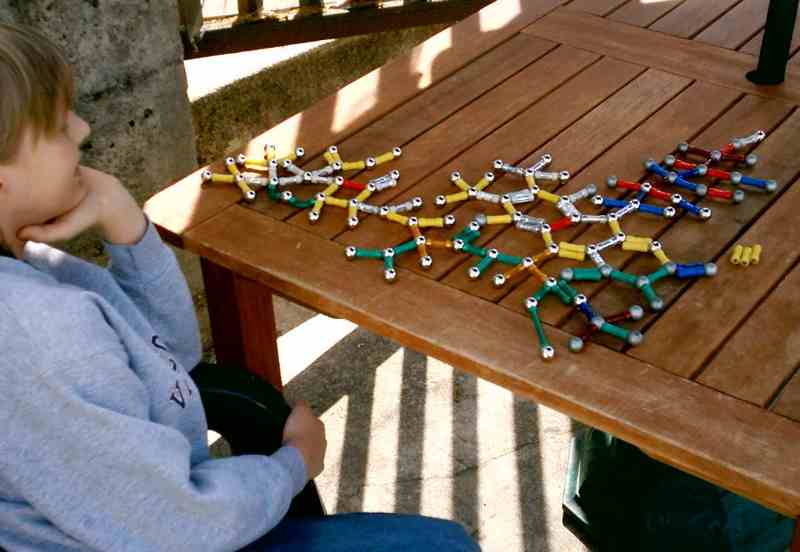
- Restricted interests or repetitive behavior may be features of Asperger syndrome; this boy is playing with a magnetic construction toy.
- Pronunciation: /ˈæs.pɜːr.ɡərz/, /-.dʒərz/
- Specialty: Clinical psychology, psychiatry, pediatrics, occupational medicine
- Symptoms: Problems with social interaction, verbal and nonverbal communication, and the presence of repetitive behavior and restricted interests
- Complications: Social isolation, employment problems, family stress, bullying, self-harm
- Usual onset: Before two years old
- Duration: Lifelong
- Causes: Inconclusive
- Diagnostic method: Based on the symptoms
- Management: Social skills training, cognitive behavioral therapy, physical therapy, speech therapy, parent training
- Medication: For associated conditions
- Frequency: 37.2 million globally (0.51%) (2015)
- Named after: Hans Asperger

Asperger syndrome (AS), also known as Asperger's syndrome or Asperger's, is a formerly used diagnostic category for a condition characterized by significant difficulties in social interaction and nonverbal communication, along with restricted and repetitive patterns of behavior and interests. It ceased to be a distinct diagnosis when it was merged into autism spectrum disorder (ASD) in the DSM-5 (2013) and ICD-11 (2022). Previously, it had been classified as a pervasive developmental disorder.

Asperger syndrome was considered milder than other diagnoses. This change reflected a shift toward a unified understanding of autism-related conditions rather than a judgment about individuals previously diagnosed with AS. Despite its removal from contemporary medical classification systems, many people continued to identify with the term Asperger's because of its long-standing use, personal relevance, and the way it shaped their diagnostic history and community identity. However, self-identification using the Asperger label became much rarer (going from 51 percent in 2018 to 19 percent in 2022, according to one set of polls) following the publication of the 2018 Edith Sheffer book Asperger's Children. In this book, the author claimed that the label's namesake was complicit in the Nazis' murder of disabled children.

The syndrome was named in 1976 by English psychiatrist Lorna Wing after the Austrian pediatrician Hans Asperger, who in 1944 described children in his care who struggled to form friendships, did not understand others' gestures or feelings, engaged in one-sided conversations about their favorite interests, and were clumsy. In 1990 (coming into effect in 1993), the diagnosis of Asperger syndrome was included in the tenth edition (ICD-10) of the World Health Organization's International Classification of Diseases, and in 1994 it was also included in the fourth edition (DSM-4) of the American Psychiatric Association's Diagnostic and Statistical Manual of Mental Disorders. With the publication of DSM-5 in 2013, the syndrome was removed, and the symptoms regarded as an autism spectrum disorder along with classic autism and pervasive developmental disorder not otherwise specified (PDD-NOS). It was similarly merged into autism spectrum disorder in the International Classification of Diseases (ICD-11) in 2018 (published, came into effect in 2022).

The cause of autism, including what was formerly called Asperger syndrome, is not well understood. While it has high heritability, the underlying genetics have not been determined conclusively. Environmental factors are also believed to play a role. Brain imaging has not identified a common underlying condition. There is no single treatment, and the UK's National Health Service (NHS) guidelines suggest that "treatment" of any form of autism should not be a goal, since autism is not "a disease that can be removed or cured". According to the Royal College of Psychiatrists, while co-occurring conditions might require treatment, "management of autism itself is chiefly about the provision of the education, training, and social support/care required to improve the person's ability to function in the everyday world". The effectiveness of particular interventions for autism is supported by only limited data. Interventions may include social skills training, cognitive behavioral therapy, physical therapy, speech therapy, parent training, and medications for associated problems, such as mood or anxiety. Autistic characteristics tend to become less obvious in adulthood, but social and communication difficulties usually persist.

In 2015, Asperger syndrome was estimated to affect 37.2 million people globally, or about 0.5% of the population. The exact percentage of people affected has still not been firmly established. Autism spectrum disorder is diagnosed in males more often than females, and females are typically diagnosed at a later age. The modern conception of Asperger syndrome came into existence in 1981 and went through a period of popularization. It became a standardized diagnosis in the 1990s, and was merged into ASD in 2013. Many questions about the condition remain.

== Classification ==
The extent of the overlap between Asperger syndrome and other forms of autism, particularly what was sometimes called high-functioning autism is unclear. The ASD classification is to some extent an artifact of how autism was discovered, and it may not reflect the true nature of the spectrum; methodological problems have beset Asperger syndrome as a valid diagnosis from the outset. As noted above, in the 2010s, Asperger syndrome, as a separate diagnosis, was eliminated and folded into autism spectrum disorder in the DSM-5 and the ICD-11. Like the diagnosis of Asperger syndrome, the change was controversial.

The World Health Organization (WHO) previously defined Asperger syndrome (AS) as one of the pervasive developmental disorders (PDD), which are a spectrum of psychological disorders that are characterized by abnormalities of social interaction and communication that pervade the individual's functioning, and by restricted and repetitive interests and behavior. Like other neurodevelopmental conditions, ASD begins in infancy or childhood, has a steady course without remission or relapse, and has impairments that result from maturation-related changes in various systems of the brain.

== Characteristics ==
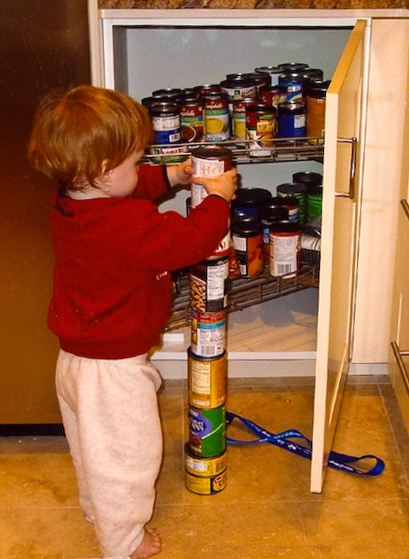
People with Asperger syndrome often display restricted or specialized interests, such as this boy's interest in stacking cans.

As a pervasive developmental disorder, Asperger syndrome is distinguished by a pattern of symptoms rather than a single symptom. It is characterized by qualitative impairment in social interaction, by stereotyped and restricted patterns of behavior, activities, and interests, and by no clinically significant delay in cognitive development or general delay in language. Intense preoccupation with a narrow subject, one-sided verbosity, restricted prosody, and physical clumsiness are typical of the condition, but are not required for diagnosis.

Suicidal thoughts and behaviors are a serious concern within the autistic population. One study found that adults with Asperger syndrome exhibited suicidal thoughts at 9 times the rate of the general population. Of autistic study participants, 66% had experienced suicidal ideation, while 35% had planned or attempted suicide.

=== Social interaction ===
A lack of demonstrated empathy affects aspects of social relatability for persons with Asperger syndrome. Individuals with Asperger syndrome experience difficulties in basic elements of social interaction, which may include a failure to develop friendships or to seek shared enjoyments or achievements with others (e.g., showing others objects of interest); a lack of social or emotional reciprocity; and impaired nonverbal behaviors in areas such as eye contact, facial expression, posture, and gesture.

People with Asperger syndrome may not be as withdrawn around others, compared with those with other forms of autism; they approach others, even if awkwardly. For example, a person with Asperger syndrome may engage in a one-sided, long-winded speech about a favorite topic, while misunderstanding or not recognizing the listener's feelings or reactions, such as a wish to change the topic of talk or end the interaction. This social awkwardness has been called "active but odd". Such failures to react appropriately to social interaction may appear as disregard for other people's feelings and may come across as rude or insensitive. However, not all individuals with Asperger syndrome will approach others. Some may even display selective mutism, not speaking at all to most people and excessively to specific others.

The cognitive ability of children with Asperger syndrome often allows them to articulate social norms in a laboratory context, where they may be able to show a theoretical understanding of other people's emotions; however, they typically have difficulty acting on this knowledge in fluid, real-life situations. People with Asperger syndrome may analyze and distill their observations of social interaction into rigid behavioral guidelines and apply these rules in awkward ways, such as forced eye contact, resulting in a demeanor that appears rigid or socially naïve. A history of failed attempts to establish reciprocal social relationships can cause autistic individuals to isolate themselves and cease attempts to engage; however, autistic people overwhelmingly report a desire for social contact and friendship.

==== Violent or criminal behavior ====
The hypothesis that individuals with Asperger syndrome are predisposed to violent or criminal behavior has been investigated but is unsupported by data. More evidence suggests that children diagnosed with Asperger syndrome are more likely to be victims, rather than offenders.

A 2008 review found that about 80% of reported violent criminals with Asperger syndrome also had other coexisting psychotic psychiatric disorders such as schizoaffective disorder. The sample size of this review was small (n = 37).

=== Empathy ===
People with an Asperger profile might not be recognized for their empathetic qualities, due to variation in the ways empathy is felt and expressed. Some people feel deep empathy, but do not outwardly communicate these sentiments through facial expressions or language. Some people come to empathy through intellectual processes, using logic and reasoning to arrive at the feelings. People with Asperger profiles may be bullied or excluded by peers, and might as a result be guarded around people, which could appear as lack of empathy. People with Asperger profiles can still be caring individuals; indeed, it is particularly common for those with the profile to feel and exhibit deep concern for individual rights, human welfare, animal rights, environmental protection, and other global and humanitarian causes.

Evidence suggests that in the "double empathy problem model, autistic people have a unique interaction style which is significantly more readable by other autistic people, compared to non-autistic people."

=== Restricted and repetitive interests and behavior ===
People with Asperger syndrome can display behavior, interests, and activities that are restricted and repetitive and are sometimes abnormally intense or focused. They may stick to inflexible routines, move in stereotyped and repetitive ways, preoccupy themselves with parts of objects, or engage in compulsive behaviors like lining objects up to form patterns.

The pursuit of specific and narrow areas of interest is one of the most striking among possible features of AS. Individuals with AS may collect volumes of detailed information on a relatively narrow topic such as weather data or star names without necessarily having a genuine understanding of the broader topic. For example, a child might memorize camera model numbers while caring little about photography. This behavior is usually apparent by age five or six. Although these special interests may change from time to time, they typically become more unusual and narrowly focused and often dominate social interaction so much that the entire family may become immersed. Because narrow topics often capture the interest of children, this symptom may go unrecognized.

Stereotyped and repetitive motor behaviors, called stimming, are a core part of the diagnosis of AS and other ASDs. Stims are believed to be used for self-soothing and regulate sensory input. They include hand movements such as flapping or twisting, and complex whole-body movements. These are typically repeated in longer bursts and look more voluntary or ritualistic than tics, which are usually faster, less rhythmical, and less often symmetrical. Stimming may have a connection with tics, and studies have reported a consistent comorbidity between AS and Tourette syndrome in the range of 8–20%, with one figure as high as 80% for tics of some kind or another, for which several explanations have been put forward, including common genetic factors and dopamine, glutamate, or serotonin abnormalities.

According to the Adult Asperger Assessment (AAA) diagnostic test, a lack of interest in fiction and a positive preference towards non-fiction is common among adults with AS.

=== Speech and language ===
Although individuals with Asperger syndrome acquire language skills without significant general delay and their speech typically lacks significant abnormalities, language acquisition and use is often atypical. Abnormalities include verbosity, abrupt transitions, literal interpretations and miscomprehension of nuance, use of metaphor meaningful only to the speaker, auditory perception deficits; unusually pedantic, formal, or idiosyncratic speech; and oddities in loudness, pitch, intonation, prosody, and rhythm. Echolalia has also been observed in individuals with AS.

Three aspects of communication patterns are of clinical interest: poor prosody, tangential and circumstantial speech, and marked verbosity. Although inflection and intonation may be less rigid or monotonic than in classic autism, people with AS often have a limited range of intonation: speech may be unusually fast, jerky, or loud. Speech may convey a sense of incoherence; the conversational style often includes monologues about topics that bore the listener, fails to provide context for comments, or fails to suppress internal thoughts. Individuals with AS may fail to detect whether the listener is interested or engaged in the conversation. The speaker's conclusion or point may never be made, and attempts by the listener to elaborate on the speech's content or logic, or to shift to related topics, are often unsuccessful.

Children with AS may have a sophisticated vocabulary at a young age and such children have often been colloquially called "little professors" but have difficulty understanding figurative language and tend to use language literally. Children with AS appear to have particular weaknesses in areas of nonliteral language that include humor, irony, teasing, and sarcasm. Although individuals with AS usually understand the cognitive basis of humor, they seem to lack understanding of the intent of humor to share the enjoyment with others. Despite strong evidence of impaired humor appreciation, anecdotal reports of humor in individuals with AS seem to challenge some psychological theories of AS and autism.

=== Motor and sensory perception ===
Individuals with Asperger syndrome may have signs or symptoms that are independent of the diagnosis but can affect the individual or the family. These include differences in perception and problems with motor skills, sleep, and emotions.

Individuals with AS often have excellent auditory and visual perception. Children with ASD often demonstrate enhanced perception of small changes in patterns such as arrangements of objects or well-known images; typically this is domain-specific and involves processing of fine-grained features. Conversely, compared with individuals with high-functioning autism, individuals with AS have deficits in some tasks involving visual-spatial perception, auditory perception, or visual memory. Many accounts of individuals with AS and ASD report other unusual sensory and perceptual skills and experiences. They may be unusually sensitive or insensitive to sound, light, and other stimuli; these sensory responses are found in other developmental disorders and are not specific to AS or to ASD. There is little support for increased fight-or-flight response or failure of habituation in autism; there is more evidence of decreased responsiveness to sensory stimuli, although several studies show no differences.

Hans Asperger's initial accounts and other diagnostic schemes include descriptions of physical clumsiness. Children with AS may be delayed in acquiring skills requiring dexterity, such as riding a bicycle or opening a jar, and may seem to move awkwardly or feel "uncomfortable in their own skin". They may be poorly coordinated or have an odd or bouncy gait or posture, poor handwriting, or problems with motor coordination. They may show problems with proprioception (sensation of body position) on measures of developmental coordination disorder (motor planning disorder), balance, tandem gait, and finger-thumb apposition. There is no evidence that these motor skills problems differentiate AS from other high-functioning ASDs.

Children with AS are more likely to have sleep problems, including difficulty in falling asleep, frequent nocturnal awakenings, and early morning awakenings. AS is also associated with high levels of alexithymia, which is difficulty in identifying and describing one's emotions. Although AS, lower sleep quality, and alexithymia are associated with each other, their causal relationship is unclear.

== Causes ==
Hans Asperger described common traits among his patients' family members, especially fathers, and research supports this observation and suggests a genetic contribution to Asperger syndrome. Although no specific genetic factor has yet been identified, multiple factors are believed to play a role in the expression of autism, given the variability in symptoms seen in children. Hundreds of genes have been linked to AS, and these genes play crucial role in a multitude of biological processes, exerting influence over the maturation and functioning of the brain. Evidence for a genetic link is that AS tends to run in families where more family members have limited behavioral symptoms similar to AS (for example, some problems with social interaction, or with language and reading skills). Most behavioral genetic research suggests that all autism spectrum disorders have shared genetic mechanisms. There may be shared genes in which particular alleles make an individual vulnerable, and varying combinations result in differing severity and symptoms in each person with AS.

A few ASD cases have been linked to exposure to teratogens (agents that cause birth defects) during the first eight weeks from conception. Although this does not exclude the possibility that ASD can be initiated or affected later, it is strong evidence that ASD arises very early in development. Many environmental factors have been hypothesized to act after birth, but none has been confirmed by scientific investigation. These environmental elements can act as independent and significant risk factors, or they can potentially influence pre-existing genetic factors in people who have a genetic predisposition.

== Mechanism ==
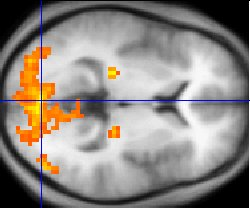
Functional magnetic resonance imaging provides some evidence for mirror neuron theory.

Asperger syndrome appears to result from developmental factors that affect many or all functional brain systems, as opposed to localized effects.

Although the specific underpinnings of AS or factors that distinguish it from other ASDs are unknown, and no clear pathology common to individuals with AS has emerged, it is still possible that AS's mechanism is separate from other ASDs.

Neuroanatomical studies and the associations with teratogens strongly suggest that the mechanism includes alteration of brain development soon after conception. Abnormal fetal development may affect the final structure and connectivity of the brain, resulting in altered neural circuits controlling thought and behavior. Several theories of mechanism are available; none are likely to provide a complete explanation.

=== General-processing theories ===
One general-processing theory is weak central coherence theory, which hypothesizes that a limited ability to see the big picture underlies the central disturbance in ASD. A related theory—enhanced perceptual functioning—focuses more on the superiority of locally oriented and perceptual operations in autistic individuals.

=== Mirror neuron system (MNS) theory ===
Upon the discovery of mirror neurons, it was proposed that alterations to mirror neuron development interfere with imitation and lead to Asperger syndrome's core feature of social impairment. The theory has since been criticised, with subsequent studies showing contradictory evidence to support claims that autism is associated with mirror neuron dysfunction.

Two other models of mirror neuron system dysfunction have been proposed, known as the emulation and planning model (EP-M), and social top-down response modulation (STORM) model. In summary, the EP-M proposes that the process of mimicry is impaired within individuals with autism, so individuals would struggle to imitate an observed action without understanding the underlying goal (for example, an autistic child being less able to spontaneously imitate a meaningless gesture or facial expression). The STORM model proposes that the processing of executed/observed actions and the social significance of the actions is impaired/reduced within people with autism. Both of these models conflict with the idea that the mirror neuron system in autistic people is 'broken'. Both the STORM and EP-M models reflect the differences between neurotypical individuals and autistic individuals better than the mirror neuron system theory regarding both imitation and motor functions.

The broken mirror hypothesis of autism aligns with social cognition theories like the theory of mind, which hypothesizes that autistic behavior arises from impairments in ascribing mental states to oneself and others; or hyper-systemizing, which hypothesizes that autistic individuals can systematize internal operations to handle internal events but are less effective at empathizing when handling events generated by other agents.

== Diagnosis ==
Standard diagnostic criteria require impairment in social interaction and repetitive and stereotyped patterns of behavior, activities, and interests, without significant delay in language or cognitive development. Unlike the international standard, the DSM-IV-TR criteria also required significant impairment in day-to-day functioning; As noted above, in the 2010s, Asperger syndrome, as a separate diagnosis, was eliminated and folded into autism spectrum disorder in the DSM-5 and the ICD-11. Other sets of diagnostic criteria have been proposed by Szatmari et al. and by Gillberg and Gillberg.

Diagnosis of ASD (and previously AS) is most commonly made between the ages of four and eleven. A comprehensive assessment involves a multidisciplinary team that observes across multiple settings, and includes neurological and genetic assessment as well as tests for cognition, psychomotor function, verbal and nonverbal strengths and weaknesses, style of learning, and skills for independent living. The "gold standard" in diagnosing ASDs combines clinical judgment with the Autism Diagnostic Interview-Revised (ADI-R), a semistructured parent interview; and the Autism Diagnostic Observation Schedule (ADOS), a conversation and play-based interview with the child. Delayed or mistaken diagnosis can be traumatic for individuals and families; for example, misdiagnosis can lead to medications that worsen behavior.

Underdiagnosis and overdiagnosis may be problems. The cost and difficulty of screening and assessment can delay diagnosis. Conversely, the increasing popularity of drug treatment options and the expansion of benefits has motivated providers to overdiagnose ASD. There are indications AS has been diagnosed more frequently in recent years, partly as a residual diagnosis for children of normal intelligence who are not autistic but have social difficulties.

There are questions about the external validity of the AS diagnosis. That is, it is unclear whether there is a practical benefit in distinguishing AS from autism or PDD-NOS; different screening tools may render different diagnoses for the same person.

=== Differential diagnosis ===
Many children with AS are initially misdiagnosed with attention deficit hyperactivity disorder (ADHD). Diagnosing adults is more challenging, as standard diagnostic criteria are designed for children and the expression of AS changes with age. Adult diagnosis requires painstaking clinical examination and thorough medical history gained from both the individual and other people who know the person, focusing on childhood behavior.

Conditions that must be considered in a differential diagnosis along with ADHD include other ASDs, the schizophrenia spectrum, personality disorders, obsessive–compulsive disorder, major depressive disorder, semantic pragmatic disorder, nonverbal learning disorder, social anxiety disorder, Tourette syndrome, stereotypic movement disorder, bipolar disorder, social-cognitive deficits due to brain damage from alcohol use disorder, and obsessive–compulsive personality disorder (OCPD).

== Screening ==
Parents of children with Asperger syndrome can typically trace differences in their children's development to as early as 30 months of age. Developmental screening during a routine check-up by a general practitioner or pediatrician may identify signs that warrant further investigation. The United States Preventive Services Task Force in 2016 found it was unclear if screening was beneficial or harmful among children in whom there are no concerns.

Different screening instruments are used to diagnose AS, including the Asperger Syndrome Diagnostic Scale (ASDS); Autism Spectrum Screening Questionnaire (ASSQ); Childhood Autism Spectrum Test (CAST), previously called the Childhood Asperger Syndrome Test; Gilliam Asperger's disorder scale (GADS); Krug Asperger's Disorder Index (KADI); and the autism-spectrum quotient (AQ), with versions for children, adolescents, and adults. None have been shown to reliably differentiate between AS and other ASDs.

== Management ==
Treatment attempts to manage distressing symptoms and to teach age-appropriate social, communication, and vocational skills that are not naturally acquired during development. Intervention is tailored to the needs of the individual based on multidisciplinary assessment. Although progress has been made, data supporting the efficacy of particular interventions are limited.

=== Therapies ===
Managing ASD may involve multiple therapies that address core symptoms of the disorder. While many professionals agree that the earlier the professional support the better, there is no combination that is recommended above others. Professional support for ASD varies depending on the individual; it takes into account the linguistic capabilities, verbal strengths, and nonverbal vulnerabilities of individuals.

Many of those diagnosed with ASD or similar disorders advocate against behavioral therapies, like applied behavior analysis (ABA) and cognitive behavioral therapy (CBT), often as part of the autism rights movement, on the grounds that these approaches frequently reinforce the demand on autistic people to mask their neurodivergent characteristics or behaviors to favor a more 'neurotypical' and narrow conception of normality. ABA has faced a great deal of criticism over the years. Recently, studies have shown that ABA may be abusive and can increase PTSD symptoms in patients. The Autistic Self Advocacy Network campaigns against the use of ABA in autism.

In the case of CBT and talking therapies, the effectiveness varies, with many reporting that they appeared 'too self-aware' to gain significant benefit, as the therapy was designed with neurotypical people in mind. In autistic children, specifically, they also report that it is only mildly beneficial in aiding with their anxieties.

A typical program of professional support generally includes:

- Applied behavior analysis (ABA) procedures, including positive behavior support (PBS)—or training and support of parents and school faculty in behavior management strategies to use in the home and school, and social skills training for more effective interpersonal interactions. The Autistic Self Advocacy Network campaigns against the use of ABA in autism;
- Cognitive behavioral therapy to improve stress management relating to anxiety or explosive emotions and to help reduce obsessive interests (although this may produce negative impact by demonising special interests) and repetitive routines;
- Medication for coexisting conditions such as major depressive disorder and anxiety disorders;
- Occupational or physical therapy to assist with poor sensory processing and motor coordination; and,
- Social communication intervention, which is specialized speech therapy to help with the pragmatics and give-and-take of normal conversation.

Of the many studies on behavior-based early intervention programs, most are case reports of up to five participants and typically examine a few problem behaviors such as self-injury, aggression, noncompliance, stereotypies, or spontaneous language; unintended side effects are largely ignored. Despite the popularity of social skills training, its effectiveness is not firmly established. A randomized controlled study of a model for training parents in problem behaviors in their children with AS showed that parents attending a one-day workshop or six individual lessons reported fewer behavioral problems, while parents receiving the individual lessons reported less intense behavioral problems in their AS children. Vocational training may be important to teach job interview etiquette and workplace behavior to older children and adults with AS, and organization software and personal data assistants can improve the work and life management of people with AS.

=== Medications ===
No medications directly treat the core symptoms of AS. Although research into the efficacy of pharmaceutical intervention for AS is limited, it is essential to diagnose and treat comorbid conditions. Deficits in self-identifying emotions or in observing effects of one's behavior on others can make it difficult for individuals with AS to see why medication may be appropriate. Medication can be effective in combination with behavioral interventions and environmental accommodations in treating comorbid symptoms such as anxiety disorders, major depressive disorder, inattention, and aggression. The atypical antipsychotic medications risperidone, olanzapine and aripiprazole have been shown to reduce the associated symptoms of AS; risperidone can reduce repetitive and self-injurious behaviors, aggressive outbursts, and impulsivity, and improve stereotypical patterns of behavior and social relatedness. The selective serotonin reuptake inhibitors (SSRIs) fluoxetine, fluvoxamine, and sertraline have been effective in treating restricted and repetitive interests and behaviors, while stimulant medication, such as methylphenidate, can reduce inattention. In addition, scientists have made a noteworthy finding that oxytocin, a hormone, plays a significant role in shaping human social behavior and the formation of interpersonal connections.

Care must be taken with medications, as side effects may be more common and harder to evaluate in individuals with AS, and tests of drugs' effectiveness against comorbid conditions routinely exclude individuals from the autism spectrum. Abnormalities in metabolism, cardiac conduction times, and an increased risk of type 2 diabetes have been raised as concerns with antipsychotic medications, along with serious long-term neurological side effects. SSRIs can lead to manifestations of behavioral activation such as increased impulsivity, aggression, and sleep disturbance. Weight gain and fatigue are commonly reported side effects of risperidone, which may also lead to increased risk for extrapyramidal symptoms such as restlessness and dystonia and increased serum prolactin levels. Sedation and weight gain are more common with olanzapine, which has also been linked with diabetes. Sedative side-effects in school-age children have ramifications for classroom learning. Individuals with AS may be unable to identify and communicate their internal moods and emotions or to tolerate side effects that for most people would not be problematic.

== Prognosis ==
There is some evidence that children with AS may see a lessening of symptoms; up to 20% of children may no longer meet the diagnostic criteria as adults, although social and communication difficulties may persist. As of 2006, no studies addressing the long-term outcome of individuals with Asperger syndrome are available and there are no systematic long-term follow-up studies of children with AS. Individuals with AS appear to have normal life expectancy, but have an increased prevalence of comorbid psychiatric conditions, such as major depressive disorder and anxiety disorders that may significantly affect prognosis. Although social impairment may be lifelong, the outcome is generally more positive than with individuals with lower-functioning autism spectrum disorders; for example, ASD symptoms are more likely to diminish with time in children with AS or forms of autism sometimes described as "high functioning". Most students with AS and forms of autism sometimes seen as "high functioning" have average mathematical ability and test slightly worse in mathematics than in general intelligence. However, mathematicians are at least three times more likely to have autism-spectrum traits than the general population, and are more likely to have family members with autism.

Although many attend regular education classes, some children with AS may attend special education classes such as separate classroom and resource room because of their social and behavioral difficulties. Adolescents with AS may exhibit ongoing difficulty with self-care or organization, and disturbances in social and romantic relationships. Despite high cognitive potential, most young adults with AS remain at home, yet some do marry and work independently. The "different-ness" adolescents experience can be traumatic. Anxiety may stem from preoccupation over possible violations of routines and rituals, from being placed in a situation without a clear schedule or expectations, or from concern with failing in social encounters; the resulting stress may manifest as inattention, withdrawal, reliance on obsessions, hyperactivity, or aggressive or oppositional behavior. Depression is often the result of chronic frustration from repeated failure to engage others socially, and mood disorders requiring treatment may develop. Clinical experience suggests the rate of suicide may be higher among those with AS, but this has not been confirmed by systematic empirical studies.

Education of families is critical in developing strategies for understanding strengths and weaknesses; helping the family to cope improves outcomes in children. Prognosis may be improved by diagnosis at a younger age that allows for early interventions, while interventions in adulthood are valuable but less beneficial. There are legal implications for individuals with AS as they run the risk of exploitation by others and may be unable to comprehend the societal implications of their actions.

== Epidemiology ==
Frequency estimates vary enormously. In 2015, it was estimated that 37.2 million people globally are affected. A 2003 review of epidemiological studies of children found autism rates ranging from 0.03 to 4.84 per 1,000, with the ratio of autism to Asperger syndrome ranging from 1.5:1 to 16:1; combining the geometric mean ratio of 5:1 with a conservative prevalence estimate for autism of 1.3 per 1,000 suggests indirectly that the prevalence of AS might be around 0.26 per 1,000. Part of the variance in estimates arises from differences in diagnostic criteria. For example, a relatively small 2007 study of 5,484 eight-year-old children in Finland found 2.9 children per 1,000 met the ICD-10 criteria for an AS diagnosis, 2.7 per 1,000 for Gillberg and Gillberg criteria, 2.5 for DSM-IV, 1.6 for Szatmari et al., and 4.3 per 1,000 for the union of the four criteria. Boys seem to be more likely to have AS than girls; estimates of the sex ratio range from 1.6:1 to 4:1, using the Gillberg and Gillberg criteria. Females with autism spectrum disorders may be underdiagnosed.

=== Comorbidities ===
Anxiety disorders and major depressive disorder are the most common conditions seen at the same time; comorbidity of these in persons with AS is estimated at 65%. Reports have associated AS with medical conditions such as aminoaciduria and ligamentous laxity, but these have been case reports or small studies and no factors have been associated with AS across studies. One study of males with AS found an increased rate of epilepsy and a high rate (51%) of nonverbal learning disorder. AS is associated with tics, Tourette syndrome and bipolar disorder. The repetitive behaviors of AS have many similarities with the symptoms of obsessive–compulsive disorder and obsessive–compulsive personality disorder, and 26% of a sample of young adults with AS were found to meet the criteria for schizoid personality disorder (which is characterised by severe social seclusion and emotional detachment), more than any other personality disorder in the sample. However many of these studies are based on clinical samples or lack standardized measures; nonetheless, comorbid conditions are relatively common.

=== Correlated characteristics ===
Research indicates that individuals with Aspergers have significantly higher rates of LGBT identities and feelings than the general population. They are also significantly more likely to be non-theistic.

== History ==
Asperger syndrome was named after the Austrian pediatrician Hans Asperger (1906–1980), but not coined by him. Asperger syndrome was a relatively new diagnosis in the field of autism, though a syndrome like it was described as early as 1925 by Soviet child psychiatrist Grunya Sukhareva (1891–1981). As a child, Asperger appears to have exhibited some features of the very condition named after him, such as remoteness and talent in language. In 1944, Asperger gave detailed descriptions of four representative children in his practice who had difficulty in integrating themselves socially and showing empathy towards peers. They also lacked nonverbal communication skills and were physically clumsy. Asperger described this "autistic psychopathy" as social isolation. Fifty years later, several standardizations of AS as a medical diagnosis were tentatively proposed, many of which diverge significantly from Asperger's original work.

Unlike what became known as AS, Asperger believed autistic psychopathy could be found in people of all levels of intelligence, including those with intellectual disability: as such, Asperger's understanding of autistic pathology was more akin to what is known as the autism spectrum today. Asperger defended the value of so-called "high-functioning" autistic individuals, writing: "We are convinced, then, that autistic people have their place in the organism of the social community. They fulfill their role well, perhaps better than anyone else could, and we are talking of people who as children had the greatest difficulties and caused untold worries to their care-givers." Asperger also believed some would be capable of exceptional achievement and original thought later in life.

Asperger's paper was published during World War II and in German, so it was not widely read elsewhere. Lorna Wing used the term Asperger syndrome in 1976, and popularized it to the English-speaking medical community in her February 1981 publication of case studies of children showing the symptoms described by Asperger, and Uta Frith translated Asperger's paper to English in 1991. Sets of diagnostic criteria were outlined by Gillberg and Gillberg in 1989 and by Szatmari et al. in the same year. AS became a standard diagnosis when it was included in the tenth edition of the World Health Organization's diagnostic manual, International Classification of Diseases (ICD-10), published in 1990 and coming into effect in 1993; and in the fourth edition of the American Psychiatric Association's diagnostic reference, Diagnostic and Statistical Manual of Mental Disorders (DSM-IV), published in 1994.

Hundreds of books, articles, and websites later described AS and prevalence estimates increased dramatically for ASD, with AS recognized as an important subgroup. Whether AS should be seen as distinct from autism, particularly forms of autism sometimes described as "high functioning", became an issue receiving significant attention and disagreement, along with questions about the empirical validation of the DSM-IV and ICD-10 criteria.

With the publication of the next major editions of the DSM and ICD, the DSM-5 (published in 2013) and the ICD-11 (published in 2018, coming into effect in 2022), AS was eliminated as a separate diagnosis and folded into the autism spectrum. A scale of "severity" levels was included in the DSM-5, whereby most people previously diagnosed with AS would have been classified as "level 1"; but these levels are not included in the ICD-11. The ICD-11 characterizes ASD with qualifiers describing the presence of disorders of intellectual development and the degree of functional language impairment; the former diagnosis of Asperger syndrome is characterized as autism spectrum disorder without disorder of intellectual development and with mild or no impairment of functional language.

According to polls taken by autistic activist Chris Bonnello (primarily of autistic people within the United States and the United Kingdom), self-use of the Asperger label declined from approximately 51 percent to 19 percent between 2018 and 2022. This drop followed the 2018 publication of Asperger's Children, a book by historian Edith Sheffer, in which she makes the claim that Asperger was complicit in the Nazis' murder of disabled children. Critics have also rejected the Asperger label for unnecessarily dividing the autistic community and reinforcing the outmoded view of the autistic spectrum as a functioning hierarchy.

== Society and culture ==
People identifying with Asperger syndrome may refer to themselves in casual conversation as aspies (a term first used in print in the Boston Globe in 1998). Some autistic people have advocated a shift in perception of autism spectrum disorders as complex syndromes, neurodivergences, and/or neurominority cognitive styles rather than diseases that must be cured. Proponents of this neurodiversity paradigm reject the notion that there is an "ideal" brain configuration and that any deviation from the norm is pathological; they promote tolerance of neurodiversity. These views are the basis for the autistic rights and autistic pride movements, within the broader neurodiversity movement. There is a contrast between the attitude of people with AS, who typically do not want to be cured and are proud of their identity; and parents of children with AS, who more often seek a "cure" of their children's autism.

Some researchers have argued that AS and other autism can be viewed as a different cognitive style, not a disorder, and that it should be removed from psychiatric and medical manuals classifying diseases (ICD) or mental disorders (DSM), much as homosexuality was removed.

Even some people typically associated with a pathology paradigm for autism are willing to consider AS a neutral difference. For example, in 2002, Simon Baron-Cohen wrote of those with AS: "In the social world, there is no great benefit to a precise eye for detail, but in the worlds of maths, computing, cataloging, music, linguistics, engineering, and science, such an eye for detail can lead to success rather than failure." Baron-Cohen cited two reasons why it might still be useful to consider AS to be a disability: to ensure provision for legally required special support, and to recognize emotional difficulties from reduced empathy, which was commonly associated with autism during that time but has since lost support. Baron-Cohen argues that the genes for ASD's combination of abilities have operated throughout recent human evolution and have made remarkable contributions to human history.

By contrast, Pier Jaarsma and Welin wrote in 2011 that the "broad version of the neurodiversity claim, covering low-functioning as well as high-functioning autism, is problematic. Only a narrow conception of neurodiversity, referring exclusively to high-functioning autists, is reasonable." They say that "higher functioning" individuals with autism may "not [be] benefited with such a psychiatric defect-based diagnosis ... some of them are being harmed by it, because of the disrespect the diagnosis displays for their natural way of being", but "think that it is still reasonable to include other categories of autism in the psychiatric diagnostics. The narrow conception of the neurodiversity claim should be accepted but the broader claim should not."
