= Nonverbal learning disorder =

Neurodevelopmental disorder

- Other names: Developmental visual–spatial disorder, nonverbal learning difficulties, nonverbal learning disability
- Specialty: Neurology, Psychiatry
- Duration: Lifelong
- Differential diagnosis: Attention deficit hyperactivity disorder, autism, bipolar disorder
- Frequency: Currently unknown, estimated to be around 3%, newer research suggests 6-9%

Nonverbal learning disorder (NVLD or NLD) is a proposed neurodevelopmental disorder characterized by core deficits in nonverbal skills, especially visual-spatial processing. People with this condition have normal or advanced verbal intelligence and significantly lower nonverbal intelligence. A review of papers found that proposed diagnostic criteria were inconsistent. Proposed additional diagnostic criteria include intact verbal intelligence, and deficits in the following: visuoconstruction abilities, speech prosody, fine motor coordination, mathematical reasoning, visuospatial memory, and social skills. NVLD is not recognised by the DSM-5.

NVLD symptoms can overlap with symptoms of autism, bipolar disorder, and attention deficit hyperactivity disorder (ADHD). For this reason, some claim a diagnosis of NVLD is more appropriate in some subset of these cases.

== Signs and symptoms ==
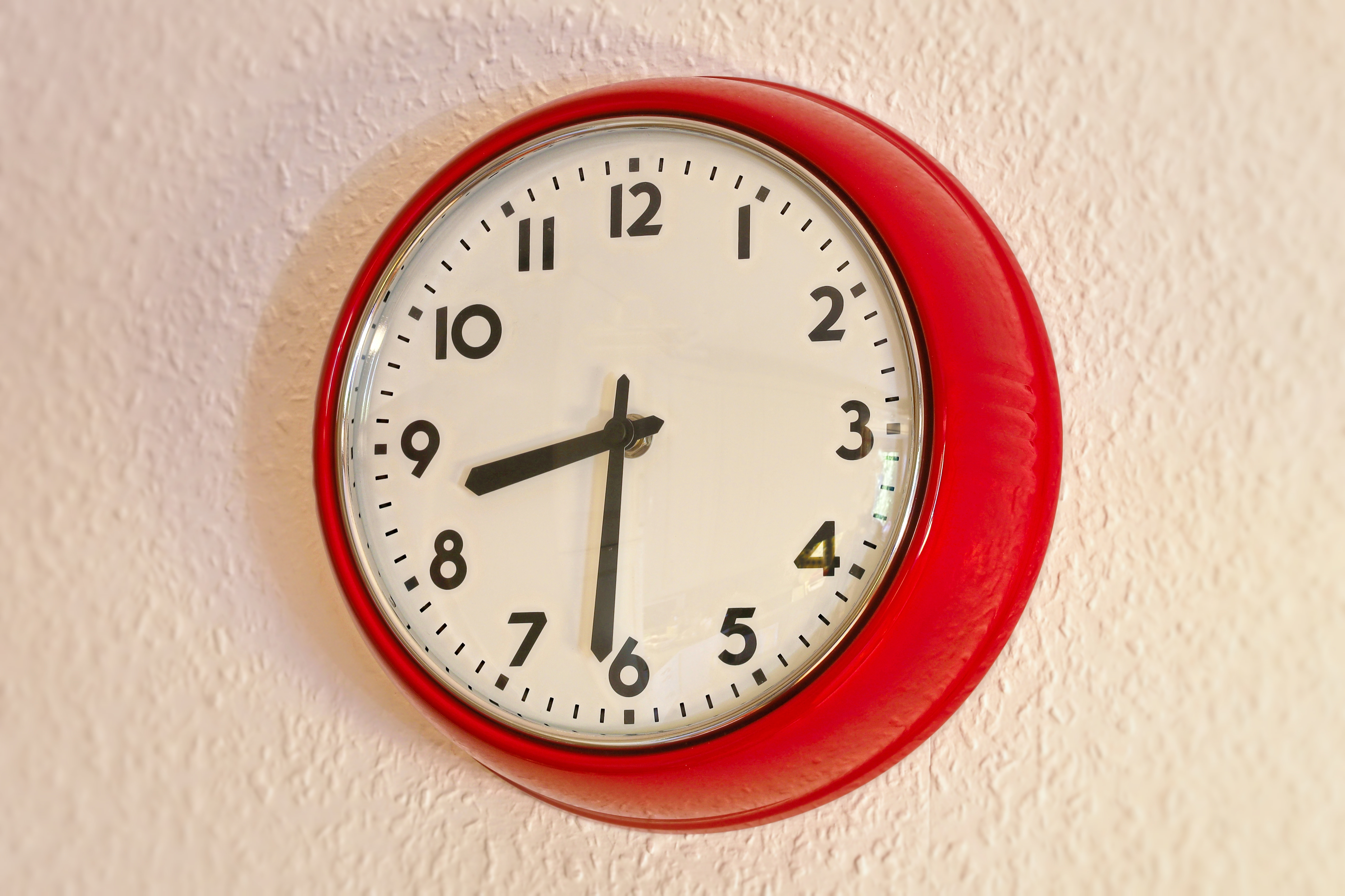
Using an analog clock to tell time is difficult for people with symptoms of NVLD.

Considered to be neurologically based, nonverbal learning disorder is characterized by:

- impairments in visuospatial processing
- discrepancy between average to superior verbal abilities and impaired nonverbal abilities, such as:
  - visuoconstruction
  - fine motor coordination
  - mathematical reasoning
  - visuospatial memory
  - socioemotional skills

People with NVLD may have trouble understanding charts, reading maps, assembling jigsaw puzzles, and using an analog clock to tell time. Motor coordination deficits are common in people with NVLD, especially children, and it may take a child with NVLD longer than usual to learn how to tie shoelaces or to ride a bicycle.

At the beginning of their school careers, children with symptoms of NVLD struggle with tasks that require eye–hand coordination, such as coloring and using scissors, but often excel at memorizing verbal content, spelling, and reading once the shapes of the letters are learned. A child with NVLD's average or superior verbal skills can be misattributed to attention deficit hyperactivity disorder, defiant behavior, inattention, or lack of effort. Early researchers of NVLD, Johnson and Myklebust, characterize how the children appear in a classroom: "An example is the child who fails to learn the meaning of the actions of others [...] We categorize this child as having a deficiency in social perception, meaning that he has an inability which precludes acquiring the significance of basic nonverbal aspects of daily living, though his verbal level of intelligence falls within or above the average."

In the adolescent years, when schoolwork becomes more abstract and the executive demands for time management, organization, and social interactions increase, students with NVLD begin to struggle. They focus on separate details and struggle to summarize information or to integrate ideas into a coherent whole, and they struggle to apply knowledge to other situations, to infer implicit information, to make predictions, and to organize information logically.

As adults, tasks such as driving a car or navigating to an unfamiliar location may be difficult. Difficulty with keeping track of responsibilities or managing social interactions may affect job performance.

People with NVLD may also fit the diagnostic criteria of dyscalculia, dysgraphia, or dyspraxia.

== Cause ==
Research suggests that there is an association with an imbalance of neural activity in the right hemisphere of the brain connected to the white matter.

== Diagnosis ==
Assorted diagnoses have been discussed as sharing symptoms with NVLD. In some cases, especially the form of autism previously called Asperger syndrome, the overlap can be significant; a major clinical difference is that NVLD criteria do not mention the presence or absence of either repetitive behaviors or narrow subject-matter interests, which is part of the diagnostic criteria for autism. These overlapping conditions include, among others:

- attention deficit hyperactivity disorder (ADHD)
- autism, especially high-functioning autism
- bipolar disorder
- developmental coordination disorder (dyspraxia)
- dyscalculia
- social communication disorder
- right hemisphere brain damage and developmental right hemisphere syndrome
- social-emotional processing disorder
- Gerstmann syndrome

There is diagnostic overlap between nonverbal learning disorder and autism, and some clinicians and researchers consider them to be the same condition. Some claim that some diagnoses of ADHD would be more appropriately classified as NVLD.

== History ==
While various nonverbal learning difficulties were recognized since early studies in child neurology, there is ongoing debate as to whether (or the extent to which) existing conceptions of NVLD provide a valid diagnostic framework.

As presented in 1967, "nonverbal disabilities" (p. 44) or "disorders of nonverbal learning" was a category encompassing non-linguistic learning problems. "Nonverbal learning disabilities" were further discussed by Myklebust in 1975 as representing a subtype of learning "disability" with a range of presentations involving "mainly visual cognitive processing," social imperception, a gap between higher verbal ability and lower nonverbal processing, as well as difficulty with handwriting. Later neuropsychologist Byron Rourke sought to develop consistent criteria with a theory and model of brain functioning that would establish NVLD as a distinct syndrome (1989).

Questions remain about how best to frame the perceptual, cognitive and motor issues associated with NVLD.

== See also ==
- Alexithymia – difficulty with understanding emotions
- Children's Nonverbal Learning Disabilities Scale
- Deficits in attention, motor control and perception
