= Multiple complex developmental disorder =

- Specialty: Neurology/psychology

Multiple complex developmental disorder (MCDD) is a research category, proposed to involve several neurological and psychological symptoms where at least some symptoms are first noticed during early childhood and persist throughout life. It was originally suggested to be a subtype of pervasive developmental disorders (PDD) with co-morbid schizophrenia or another psychotic disorder; however, there is some controversy that not everyone with MCDD meets criteria for both PDD and psychosis. The term multiplex developmental disorder was coined by Donald J. Cohen in 1986.

== Diagnostic criteria ==
The current diagnostic criteria for MCDD are a matter of debate due to it not being in the DSM-5 or ICD-10. Various websites contain various diagnostic criteria. At least three of the following categories should be present. Co-occurring clusters of symptoms must also not be better explained by being symptoms of another disorder such as experiencing mood swings due to autism, cognitive difficulties due to schizophrenia, and so on. The exact diagnostic criteria for MCDD remain unclear but may be a useful diagnosis for people who do not fall into any specific category. It could also be argued that MCDD is a vague and unhelpful term for these patients.

1. Regulation of affective state (anxiety, panic and aggression).

Intense generalized anxiety, diffuse tension, or irritability. Unusual fears and phobias that are peculiar in content or in intensity. Recurrent panic episodes, terror, or flooding with anxiety. Episodes lasting from minutes to days of behavioral disorganization or regression with the emergence of markedly immature, primitive, and/or self-injurious behaviors. Significant and wide emotional variability with or without environmental precipitants. High frequency of idiosyncratic anxiety reactions such as sustained periods of uncontrollable giggling, giddiness, laughter, or "silly" affect that is inappropriate in the context of the situation.

2. Consistent impairments in social behavior and sensitivity.

Social disinterest, detachment, avoidance, or withdrawal in the face of evident competence (at times) of social engagement, particularly with adults. More often attachments may appear friendly and cooperative but very superficial, based primarily on receiving material needs. Inability to initiate or maintain peer relationships. Disturbed attachments displaying high degrees of ambivalence to adults, particularly to parents/caregivers, as manifested by clinging, overly controlling, needy behavior, and/or shifting aggressive, oppositional behavior toward parents, teachers, or therapists are common. Profound limitations in the capacity of empathy or to read or understand others' affects accurately.

3. Impaired cognitive processing (thinking disorder)

Thought problems that are well out of proportion with mental age, including irrationality, sudden intrusions on normal thought process, magical thinking, neologisms or nonsense words repeated over and over, desultory thinking, blatantly illogical bizarre ideas. Confusion between reality and fantasy life. Perplexity and easy confusability (trouble with understanding ongoing social processes and keeping one's thoughts "straight"). Delusions, including fantasies of personal omnipotence, paranoid preoccupations, over engagement with fantasy figures, grandiose fantasies of special powers, and referential ideation.

== Causes ==
Multiple complex developmental disorder is likely to be caused by a number of different various genetic factors. Each individual with MCDD is unique from one another and displays different symptoms. Various neuropsychological disorders can also be found in family members of people with MCDD.
