= Special education in the United States =

Education of children with disabilities in the United States

Special education in the United States enables students with exceptional learning needs to access resources through special education programs. The idea of excluding students with any disability from public school education can be traced back to 1893, when the Massachusetts Supreme Court expelled a student merely due to poor academic ability. Several court cases and mounting civil rights legislation prompted congress to pass the Education for All Handicapped Children Act (EAHCA) in 1975 (sometimes referred to using the acronyms EAHCA or EHA, or Public Law (PL) 94-142), in response to discriminatory treatment by public educational agencies against students with disabilities. The EAHCA has been reauthorized multiple times and was later modified to strengthen protections to students with disabilities and renamed the Individuals with Disabilities Education Act (IDEA). IDEA requires states to provide special education and related services consistent with federal standards as a condition of receiving federal funds.

IDEA entitles every student to a free and appropriate public education (FAPE) in the least restrictive environment (LRE). To ensure a FAPE, a team of professionals from the local educational agency and the student's parents identify the student's unique educational needs, develop annual goals for the student, and determine the placement, program modification, testing accommodations, counseling, and other special services which meet the student's needs. Parents are supposed to be equal participants in this process as well as others that are knowledgeable about the child, the meaning of the data collected through the evaluation, and all placement options. The student's plan, to include the above items, is recorded in a written Individualized Education Program (IEP). The child's placement is typically determined by the annual assessment, based on the child's IEP, and as close in proximity to the child's home as possible. The school is required to develop and implement an IEP that meets the standards of federal and state educational agencies. The state department of education oversees its schools to make sure they are compliant to every student's IEP. If schools fail to comply to the child's IEP, the school district may be put on trial. Parents have the option of refusing special education services for their child if they choose.

Under IDEA, students with disabilities are entitled to receive special education services through their local school district from ages 3 to 18 or 21. To receive special education services, a student must demonstrate a disability in one of 13 specific categories, including autism, developmental disability, specific learning disability, intellectual impairment, emotional or behavioral disability, intellectual disability, speech and language disability, deaf-blind, visual impairment, hearing impairment, orthopedic or physical impairment, other health impaired (including attention deficit disorder), multiple disabilities and traumatic brain injury. Depending on the students' individual needs, they may be included, mainstreamed, or placed in a special school or may receive many specialized services in separate classrooms. In addition to academic goals, the goals documented in the IEP may address self-care, social skills, physical, speech, and vocational training. The program placement is an integral part of the process and typically takes place during the IEP meeting. During the 2022–2023 academic year, a record of 7.5 million public school students in the United States (or 15.2% of students enrolled) received special education services due to rising rates of autism and ADHD among children and adolescents.

== Free Appropriate Public Education (FAPE) ==
A Free Appropriate Public Education means special education and related services that:

- Are provided at public expense, under public supervision and direction, and without charge,
- Meet state requirements and the requirements of federal regulations
- Include an appropriate preschool, elementary school, or secondary school education in the State involved, and
- Comply with a lawful Individual/Individualized Education Program

== Least restrictive environment ==
The least restrictive environment is defined as "educating students with disabilities to the maximum extent appropriate with students without disabilities". It specifies that transferring learners from the general education environment may occur only when the nature or severity of the student's disability precludes satisfactory instruction in general education classes, even with supplementary aids and services.

The least restrictive environment (LRE) mandate requires that all students in special education be educated alongside their peers to the greatest extent possible while still providing FAPE. The LRE requirement is intended to prevent unnecessary segregation of students with disabilities and is based on Congress' finding students with disabilities tend to have more success when they remain with or have access to typical peers. More students with disabilities are being educated in regular education classrooms. Up to 95% of students with disabilities spend at least part of their day in regular education classrooms, and 64% of Special Education students spend their day in a regular classroom.[4]as of 2016.

Although students should be educated in their LRE according to the law, a student's behavior is key to the LRE. If the behavior is not appropriate in that LRE, then it can be addressed with restrictions and (BIP) Behavior Intervention Plan. A Behavior Intervention Plan is a plan that is based on the results of a functional behavioral assessment (FBA) and, at minimum, includes a description of the problem behavior, global and specific hypothesis as to why the problem behavior occurs, and intervention strategies that include positive behavior supports and services to address the behavior. School systems must allow one of the following persons to write and train teachers on the plan, before implementation in the classroom. This plan will have to be merged with the IEP to ensure a successful learning environment.

== Related services ==
Special education-related services include speech and language therapy, occupational therapy, and physical therapy. Certified orientation and mobility specialists, teachers of the visually impaired, board-certified behavior analysts, and music therapists may service eligible students. Music therapy is a more modern service, and it may not be widely accessible across the country. Services can be rendered in individual or small group sessions, in the general education classroom, or simply as a consult between the service provider and other team members. Each related service provider on the team must include goals in the IEP as well as specific time allocated to the student.

== Setting for individualized services ==
Many schools are incorporating inclusive classrooms in which both a general education and special education teacher "co-teach." Together both educators work as a team to deliver instruction while implementing the legal modifications and accommodations of the special needs students in the class.

If a student is unable to learn in a fully inclusive environment, the special education team may place the student in a more restrictive setting, usually partial inclusion. As the name implies, partial inclusion is when the student with disabilities participates in the general education setting for part of the day and receives the bulk of academic instruction in a pull-out classroom, such as the resource room, with the special education teacher or other staff.

Some students require life-skills-based academics due to the severity of their disabilities. Such students are assigned to a self-contained classroom where they spend around 60% of their school day working directly with the special education staff. Depending upon the circumstances, students may or may not participate in the general education classroom with typical peers.

If a student is unable to function within the general-education classroom or the special-education classroom, the team's next step is to consider placing the student at a school specializing in the education of children with extreme disabilities. The trend during the 1990s was to move away from this model, as previous research pointed to academic and behavioral growth among these students when taught via individualized instruction within the general setting.

If the student has a very severe health condition or is not able to attend school for some other reason, they will receive instruction at home. A special education teacher, staff, and related service providers go to the student's home to deliver instruction.

The highest level of restrictive placement is institutionalization. When the student's needs are such that they cannot function in any of the less restrictive environments, residential placement must be considered by the team. Very few students in the United States today are in residential placement. The goal is usually to get the student to a point where they can return to the public school campus, if at all possible.

== History in the U.S. ==
Until the passage of PL 94-142 in 1975, American schools educated only one out of five children with disabilities. More than one-million students were refused access to public schools and another 3.5 million received little or no effective instruction. Many states had laws that explicitly excluded children with certain types of disabilities, including children who were blind, deaf, and children labeled "emotionally disturbed" or "mentally retarded."

In the 1950s and 1960s, family associations began forming and advocating for the rights of children with disabilities. In response, the federal government began to allocate funds to develop methods of working with children with disabilities and passed several pieces of legislation that supported developing and implementing programs and services to meet their needs and those of their families. Two laws provided training for professionals and teachers who worked with students with "mental retardation" (PL 85–926 in 1958 and PL 86–158 in 1959). In 1961, the Teachers of the Deaf Act (PL 87-276) provided for training of teachers to work with the deaf or hard of hearing. In 1965, the Elementary and Secondary Education Act (PL 89–10) and the State Schools Act (PL 89-313) granted funds to states to help educate children with disabilities. In 1968, the Handicapped Children's Early Education Assistance Act of 1968 (PL 90-538) funded early childhood intervention for children with disabilities. Several landmark court decisions established the responsibility of states to educate children with disabilities (in particular, Pennsylvania Association for Retarded Citizens (PARC) v. Commonwealth of Pennsylvania (1971) and Mills v. Board of Education of the District of Columbia (1972)).

=== Rehabilitation Act of 1973 ===
Section 504 of the 1973 Rehabilitation Act guaranteed civil rights for disabled people in the context of federally funded institutions or any program or activity receiving federal financial assistance. It required accommodations in affected schools for disabled people, including access to buildings and structures and improved integration into society. Act 504 applies to all people throughout their lifetimes, not just the span of 3–21 years. A person with a 504 plan does not need to have an educational disability, rather any disability which significantly impacts major life activities.

=== Education for All Handicapped Children Act of 1975 ===
In 1975, the Education for All Handicapped Children Act (EHA) Public Law 94-142 established the right of children with disabilities to receive a free, appropriate public education and provided funds to enable state and local education agencies to comply with the new requirements. The act stated that its purpose was fourfold:

- To assure that all children with disabilities receive a free appropriate public education emphasizing special education and related services designed to meet their unique needs
- To protect the rights of children with disabilities and their parents
- To help state and local education agencies provide for the education of all children with disabilities
- To assess and assure the effectiveness of efforts to educate all children with disabilities

In 1986 EHA was reauthorized as PL 99-457, additionally covering infants and toddlers below age 3 with disabilities, and providing for associated Individual Family Service Plans (IFSP), prepared documents to ensure individualized special service delivery to families of respective infants and toddlers.

=== Americans with Disabilities Act ===
Providing individuals with identified disabilities similar protections from discrimination as those granted by the Civil Rights Act of 1964, the Americans with Disabilities Act of 1990 (ADA) barred discrimination in employment (Title 1), public services and transportation (Title 2) public accommodations (Title 3), telecommunications (Title 4) and miscellaneous provisions (Title 5). It was a step in normalizing the lives of disabled people. Title 3 prohibited disability-based discrimination in any place of public accommodation with regard to full and equal enjoyment of the goods, services, facilities, or accommodations. Public accommodations included most places of education.

=== Individuals with Disabilities Education Act (IDEA) ===
The law regarding disability education underwent a change with the introduction of Individuals with Disabilities Education Act (IDEA). Prior to that time, the statutory focus in EHA was to provide access to education for disabled students who had been marginalized in the public school system. Satisfied that the goal of "access" had been reached, in 1997 Congress enacted IDEA with the express purpose of addressing implementation problems resulting from "low expectations, and an insufficient focus on applying replicable research on proven methods of teaching and learning for children with disabilities." 20 U.S.C. § 1400(c)(4). The statute clearly stated its commitment to "our national policy of ensuring equality of opportunity, full participation, independent living, and economic self-sufficiency for individuals with disabilities." 20 U.S.C. § 1400(c)(1).

Arguably, passage of IDEA represented a significant shift in focus from the disability education system in place prior to 1997. IDEA added individualized transition plans (ITP) for transitioning individuals from secondary school to adult life or post secondary education. Special education coverage was extended to the categories of autism and traumatic brain injury (TBI). In 1997 IDEA was reauthorized as PL 105-17 and extended coverage to attention deficit hyperactivity disorder (ADHD), functional behavioral assessments and intervention plans were added, and the ITP's were integrated within IEP's. An additional re-authorization was made in 2004 (below).

Like EHEA before it, the act's zero reject rule requires schools to provide educational services to every disabled child, even if there is no hope of the child benefiting from the services (e.g., if the child is in a coma).

=== No Child Left Behind ===
The Elementary and Secondary Education Act of 2001 (ESEA) PL 107–110, more popularly known as the No Child Left Behind Act required accountability for the academic performance of all schoolchildren, including those with disabilities. It called for 100% proficiency in reading and math by the year 2012.

The Assistive Technology Act of 2004 (ATA) PL 108-364 provided support for school-to-work transition projects and created loan programs for the purchase of assistive technology (AT) devices.

The 2004 Individuals with Disabilities Education Act reauthorization PL 108-446 changed learning disability identification procedures, required high qualification standards for special education teachers, stipulated that all students with disabilities participate in annual state or district testing or documented alternate assessments, and allowed in response to activities related to weapons, drugs or violence that a student could be placed in interim alternative educational setting.

Some student disability protections not covered by IDEA may be still covered under Section 504 or ADA due to a broader definitions of what constitutes a disability. There are some rumors in the Education field about NCLB. There is a rumor that teachers are forced to test children with severe disabilities. IDEA does cover children under the Disability Act. The problem is that they group all children as having the same severe disability. Erin Dillon, a former Senior Policy Analyst, states as a writer for "EducationSector" that all special education students do not fit the criteria of severely disabled. Students can reach grade level with tools and accommodations in place. NCLB has become more accountable by placing students in subgroups to identify the specific disability. Most of the students under IDEA have been put in the category of LEARNING DISABLED (LD). The LD label is there to ensure that students get the proper help needed to obtain grade level performances. Dillon notes that there are 4 groups that service 80% of special education; Learning Disabled (LD), Emotional Disturbed (ED), Speech and Language Impairments & other Health Impairments, such as ADD. Since 1977 the population of students with disabilities has increased from 8% to 14% to 2006 (Dillon). African-American students account for 15% of the total student population, but carry a 21% of the identified special education students. Studies show that most Afro-American students are labeled in special education as MR or ED; white students are labeled as Autism. The major issue is how to count the scores and be fair to this population of special education students, (Quality Counts 2004, Count Me In).

== Federal funding ==
According to a CSEF 2004 report special education enrollments and expenditures have been growing steadily since the implementation of the IDEA in 1975. It appears that total special education expenditures have been growing faster than general education expenditures, but that this is primarily because the enrollments and identification of special education students has increased faster than the rate of the overall student population. Increasing special education enrollments of children birth through 21 as a percentage of total student enrollments can be attributed to several factors, including rising numbers of at-risk school-age children, and increasing numbers of preschool children, as well as infants and toddlers (Birth to age 3) served through IDEA Part C. Special education expenditures have demonstrated steady increases paralleling and likely caused by this steady, uninterrupted growth in enrollments. Based on 1999-2000 data from the national SEEP, the 50 states and the District of Columbia spent approximately $50 billion on special education services alone, and $78.3 billion on all educational services required to educate students with disabilities (including regular education services and other special needs programs such as Title I and English language learners) amounting to $8,080 per special education student.

The main source of federal government funding for special education programs is the IDEA Part B. Part B is the legislature that mandates the federal disbursement of funds to the state government and regulation of special education programs. Once the state receives the disbursement, the funds are disbursed to each local school district in accordance with the IDEA Part B standards and the funding method of the state.

Part B of IDEA originally authorized Congress to contribute up to 40 percent of the national average per pupil expenditure for each special education student. 20 U.S.C. § 1411(a). Appropriations for special education have failed to implement that original authorization. Several studies have sought to track the apparent disparity between the federal commitment to special education and the shortfall in funding. A 2003 study by SEEP, now the Center for Special Education Finance, determined that the per pupil expenditures for special education range from a low of $10,558 for students with specific learning disabilities to a high of $20,095 for students with multiple disabilities. According to the SEEP study, expenditures for students with specific learning disabilities were 1.6 times the expenditure for a regular education student, whereas expenditures for students with multiple disabilities were 3.1 times higher. Most states, in turn, have failed to make up the gap in federal funding, and this in turn has created financial pressures on local school districts. This has led to periodic calls for bringing appropriations in line with the original authorization.

During the 1999–2000 school year, the 50 states and the District of Columbia spent approximately $50 billion on special education services, amounting to $8,080 per special education student. The total spending on regular and special education services to students with disabilities amounted to $77.3 billion, or an average of $12,474 per student. An additional one-billion dollars was expended on students with disabilities for other special needs programs (e.g., Title I, English language learners, or gifted and talented students), bringing the per-student amount to $12,639. The total spending to educate students with disabilities, including regular education and special education, represents 21.4% of the $360.6 billion total spending on elementary and secondary education in the United States. The additional expenditure to educate the average student with a disability is estimated to be $5,918 per student. This is the difference between the total expenditure per student eligible for special education services ($12,474) and the total expenditure per regular education student ($6,556). Based on 1999-2000 school-year data, the total expenditure to educate the average student with disabilities is an estimated 1.90 times that expended to educate the typical regular education student with no special needs.

=== State funding systems ===
According to a CSEF Report on State Special Education Finance Systems, on average, states provide about 45 percent and local districts about 46 percent of the support for special education programs, with the remaining 9 percent provided through federal IDEA funding. States use a variety of methods of allocating funds to school districts. Under a weighted special education funding system, (used by about 34% of the states), state special education aid is allocated on a per-student basis. Under the weighted funding system, the amount of aid provided to local districts is based on the funding "weight" associated with each special education student, enabling districts serving students with greater needs to receive more money than districts whose students require fewer services. Under a flat grant system, (used in only one state) funding is based on a fixed funding amount per student.

Other states provide a flat grant based on the count of all students in a district, rather than on the number of special education students. Advocates for this system argue that it takes away the incentive to over-identify students for special education. However, the range of special education-eligible students in various districts is so broad, that the flat grant-based system creates significant disparities in the local effort required.

There are other funding systems in use. Under a resource-based system, funding is based on an allocation of specific education resources, such as teachers or classroom units. Resource-based formulas include unit and personnel mechanisms in which funds are based on payment for specified resources, such as teachers, aides, or equipment. Under a percentage reimbursement system, the amount of state special education aid a district receives is directly based on its expenditures for the program. The variable block grant is used to describe funding approaches in which funding is determined in part by base year allocations, expenditures or enrollment. Many states use separate funding mechanisms to target resources to specific populations or areas of policy concern, such as extended school year services or specialized equipment. According to the CSEF report, a growing number of states have a separate funding stream that can be accessed by districts serving exceptionally "high-cost" special education students.

=== Maintenance of effort ===
Federal special education funding is intended to maintain or improve the quality of special education services. This purpose would be undercut if additional federal dollars were "supplanted" by merely reducing the level of state or local funding for special education. For this reason, like many other such programs, the federal law and regulations contain accounting guidelines requiring "maintenance of effort". The statute says that federal funds provided to the local education agency "(i) Shall be used only to pay the excess cost of providing special education and related services to children with disabilities; (ii) Shall be used to supplement State, local and other Federal funds and not to supplant such funds; and (iii) Shall not be used ...to reduce the level of expenditures for the education of children with disabilities made by the local education agency from local funds below the level of those expenditures for the preceding fiscal year. 20 USC 1413 Regulations implementing this requirement begin with a test that seeks to assure that funds provided to a local education agency (LEA) under Part B of IDEA may not be used to reduce the level of expenditures for the education of children with disabilities made by the LEA from local funds below the level of those expenditures for the preceding fiscal year. Implementing this requirement fairly at the local level requires some exceptions

== Qualifying students for special education ==
By federal law, no student is too disabled to qualify for a free, appropriate education.

=== Referral ===
Parents who suspect or know that their child has a problem making adequate school progress should request an evaluation from their local school district. The request, called a "referral for evaluation," should be initiated in writing or in person. The referral should be addressed to the principal of the local public school or the special education coordinator for the district, and should provide the child's name, date of birth, address, current school placement (if applicable), and the suspected area of disability or special need. Referrals can also be made by general education teachers or guidance counselors. Upon receipt of the referral, the school district will contact the parent to set up a meeting time in order to explain the process and obtain written consent to perform the necessary evaluations. To prepare for this meeting, parents should be able to describe their child's problems in depth, providing examples of their child's difficulties in the classroom. Parents can request any evaluations they feel are needed to add to the picture of the child's specific educational needs, such as speech and language testing, occupational therapy testing or neurological testing. All evaluations needed to provide a full picture of the child's disabilities, as determined by the school psychologist or referral team, must be provided by the school system at no cost to the family.

=== Evaluation ===
After the referral process, the district will begin the evaluation. The law requires a comprehensive and nondiscriminatory school evaluation involving all areas of suspected disability.

Testing must be in the native language of the child (if feasible). It must be administered by a team of professionals, which must include at least a general education teacher, one special education teacher, and a specialist who is knowledgeable in the area of the child's disability. Testing must be administered one-to-one, not in a group. Any tests or other evaluation materials used must be administered by professionals trained and qualified to administer them; i.e., psychological testing must be conducted by a psychologist trained to administer the specific tests utilized. Teachers also document any interventions they have already been using in the classroom. In addition, teachers will use formal tests such as DIBELS (Dynamic Indicators of Basic Early Literacy Skills), DRA (Developmental Reading Assessment), WJ III (Woodcock Johnson Tests of Achievement) or the WIAT (Wechsler Individual Achievement Test) to see if they are on grade level or below.

In addition to testing, an observation of the child either in school or in a comparable situation is required for an initial evaluation, and often at later stages as well. It is through the observation that the child can be assessed while interacting with their peers and teachers. To ensure objectivity and cross-referencing, this observation must be conducted by a person other than the child's classroom teacher. The observation need not be done exclusively in the child's classroom, especially when the child's suspected area of disability may become manifest in larger settings, such as the lunchroom, hallways or gym.

=== Classification ===
Once all the evaluative material is presented and reviewed at the meeting, the IEP team must first determine whether the child is eligible for special education services. An eligible child will require special education intervention in order to enable them to receive the benefits of instruction and an education. If the team finds the child eligible for special education, they must then classify the child in one of 13 categories.

The following is a data table on students in the U.S. and outlying areas aged 6 through 21 who received special education in the 2006–2007 school year.

Disability	Students	Percentage
Learning disability (LD)	2,710,476	44.6%
Speech or language impairment (SI)	1,160,904	19.1%
Other health impairment (OHI)	599,494	9.9%
Intellectually Disabled (ID)	523,240	8.6%
Emotional disturbance (ED)	458,881	7.5%
Autism	224,594	3.7%
Multiple disabilities	134,189	2.2%
Developmental delay	83,931	1.4%
Hearing impairment (HI)	72,559	1.2%
Orthopedic impairment (OI)	61,866	1.0%
Visual impairment (VI)	26,352	0.4%
Traumatic brain injury (TBI)	23,932	0.4%
Deaf & blindness	1,472	0.0%

The IDEA allows, but does not require, school districts to add the classifications of Attention- Deficit/Hyperactivity Disorder (ADHD) and Pervasive Developmental Disorder (PDD) at their discretion.

== Development of the Individual Education Program (IEP) ==
The Individual Education Program is developed by a team (sometimes referred to as the Committee on Special Education) that must include at least one parent and the professionals who work with the student. This may also include staff such as speech therapists and occupational therapists. Teachers and a representative from the school administration are generally required to attend these meetings. Parents may additionally include anyone they choose, for any reason they choose.

Parents must be notified of the meeting in writing. The notification must indicate the purpose, time and location of the meeting and list the people who will be in attendance, including the name and position of each person. If parents are unable to attend at the appointed time, the meeting should be rescheduled to accommodate the needs of the family.

=== The Individual Education Program ===
The IEP must include:

- A statement of the child's present levels of educational performance, which describes the effects of the child's disability on all affected areas of the child's academic and non-academic school performance.
- A statement of annual goals including short-term objectives. Annual goals must describe what the child is expected to accomplish in 12 months in the special education program. Short-term objectives should describe the steps required to achieve the goals. Goals and objectives are specific in all areas in which the child is receiving special education services.
- A statement of the specific special education and related services to be provided to the child and the extent to which the child will participate in regular education programs.
- The projected dates for the initiation of services.

=== Determining the appropriate placement ===
After the IEP meeting, the parents must be given written notice of exactly where and how the services will be provided for their child. Most often, the suggested program will be located within the public school system in the district. When a student's disability is such that their needs cannot be met in the district, the school district may suggest a placement in an out-of-district program. These programs can include a Day Treatment Program, a Non-public Special Education School, a Residential School, or Home Instruction. In all cases, parents should visit the sites that are recommended to observe the program to determine if the program is appropriate for their child.

== Procedural safeguards ==
Procedural safeguards are procedures in special education explained to a parent or guardian for them to be informed throughout the special education process. Typically they are presented at a team meeting, but can be provided sooner. They include:

- Notice of procedural safeguards

Required content

- Parental participation in the process

Right to participate in all meetings, including identification, evaluation, placement, and all discussions regarding the educational plan.

- Parent right to review all educational records
- Parent right to an independent evaluation
- Prior written notice

Prior written notice when a school proposes to initiate a service, conduct an evaluation, change a placement, or modify an IEP; or when the school refuses to provide a parent-requested service, identification, evaluation, or change of placement or IEP
Content of prior written notice

- Right to submit a complaint to SEA
- Mediation

Voluntary mediation to be provided by SEA at no cost to parents

- Impartial due process hearing

=== Impartial hearing/mediation ===
Parents may disagree with the program recommendation of the school district. In that event, parents may reject the district's recommendations by notifying the school district clearly and concisely of the reasons for the rejection of the IEP recommendation. This notice must be given in writing within 30 days of receipt of the program recommendation.

The IDEA provides for two methods of resolving disputes between parents and school districts. These include:

1. Mediation may be a viable means to review small disagreements with the IEP, such as the number of sessions for a related service or the size of a special education class.

2. Impartial hearing which is a due process-based formal proceeding that allows the parents to challenge the district's education plan in whole or in part.

== Student conduct and discipline ==
A student who has engaged in behavior that violates student conduct codes and is punished with a suspension or change in placement exceeding ten days must be given a Manifestation Determination Hearing. This hearing is utilized to determine whether the behavior stems from the disability. If it is, the school district will attempt to change the student's program to address the problem or move the student into a more restrictive environment. If the behavior is not related to the disability (e.g., a student with dyslexia who hits another student), then the student can be punished exactly like any non-disabled student.

Students with disabilities may not be suspended for more than 10 days or expelled from school if the behavior problem is caused by the student's disability. If a student with special needs is suspended or expelled from school, then the school district normally must continue to provide educational services (for example, through a home study program).

Students with disabilities are not exempted from criminal laws and are treated like any students in those respects. For example, under Missouri's Safe Schools Act, any student charged with or convicted of murder, forcible rape, or several other violent crimes must be removed from school; there is no exemption for special education students. Drug abuse, weapons possession, or inflicting serious bodily injury (e.g., by assaulting a staff person, student, or visitor to the school) can also result in longer suspensions, even if the violation was caused by the student's disability.

== Methods to teaching special education ==
There are so many different ways to teach special education and in the past decade, there has been an increase in the number of students with disabilities as well as the number of resources available to them. Students using special education services have grown 13.1 percent in 2009–10, and about 14.4 percent since 2019–20.

=== Co-teaching ===
Co-teaching offers a diversity that can provide flexibility and change daily, depending on students' individual needs. For special education, the co-teacher provides additional support and ideas for how to best support the student. Furthermore, having two teachers in the classroom allows students to get more immediate help because they do not have to wait as long for teachers to finish helping other students first. Another element of co-teaching is that it allows students with learning disabilities to be integrated in a traditional classroom setting. Co-teaching requires communication between teachers about the best way to teach on a daily basis, and for special education students, this can be beneficial because they are able to coordinate and discuss the most effective way of teaching for that particular day. Being surrounded by peers who do not have learning disabilities can serve as another form of aid and interaction, rather than being completely isolated in their own classroom. Interaction among their classmates without learning disabilities can also provide a sense of belonging and acceptance which can further improve and encourage learning. Inclusion can raise student performance and enhance their learning in a traditional classroom setting.

=== Music ===
Learning disabilities for children disrupt a process in the brain where neurons fire upon learning something new. Due to the learning disability, neural networks may not necessarily work as efficiently which causes difficulty in retrieving information for these students. This means that students fall below the level of academic success that their peers are achieving, causing them to likely lash out or behave in a disturbing way as a result.

Cognitive behavior modification (CBM) is a blend of operant learning modification, social learning, and cognitive theory, and helps shape students' behaviors. Consistent consequences can shape students' behaviors. Overall, the combination of these three methods of learning allows for students to become active in the learning process which will allow for music teachers to create an effective learning environment. To combat this, music teachers can get students involved by clapping, or for more enthusiasm, playing the xylophone. A child with a learning disability does not automatically connect and organize new information. By associating them with music, they are more likely to internalize the information. One easy way for teachers to address the needs of these students is by providing a simple outline on the board or a handout to students as well. With younger students, this can be in the form of a picture board where teachers can review the content they are about to teach to these students. Ultimately, this allows for students to organize and have a general framework for the material they are about to learn. A specific strategy that provides an organizational framework is mnemonic devices. For example, the notes on a treble clef can be learned as FACe and lined notes are memorized as "Every Good Boy Does Fine." These measures are most impactful when the teachers take the time to teach the process, and when taught well, students learn how to evaluate their own work. For students who have ADHD, a structured environment in a music classroom will likely prove to be more effective. This means keeping a consistent arrangement day to day, assigned seating (placing ADHD students away from distractions), a consistent routine, setting clear expectations, minimizing downtime, and preparing the children for distractions are all ways to implement a structured environment. Music teachers can allow for movement and musical experiences to keep them intrigued and concentrated.

== Studies and data ==
A variety of resources provide global analysis for policymaking in special education. The Special Education Elementary Longitudinal Study (SEELS) was a study of school-age students funded by the Office of Special Education Programs (OSEP) in the U.S. Department of Education and was part of the national assessment of the 1997 Individuals with Disabilities Education Act (IDEA 97). From 2000 to 2006, SEELS documented the school experiences of a national sample of students as they moved from elementary to middle school and from middle to high school. One important feature of SEELS was that it did not look at students' educational, social, vocational, and personal development at a single point in time. Rather, it was designed to assess change in these areas over time.

Since 1992, the Center for Special Education Finance (CSEF) has addressed fiscal policy issues related to the delivery and support of special education services throughout the United States. CSEF conducted The Special Education Expenditure Project (SEEP) the fourth such project sponsored by the Office of Special Education Programs (OSEP) and its predecessor to examine the nation's spending on special education and related services in the past 40 years. Eight SEEP studies are available on the Web.

IDEA requires that the Department of Education report annually on the progress made toward the provision of a free appropriate public education to all children with disabilities and the provision of early intervention services to infants and toddlers with disabilities. The 27th Annual Report consists of two volumes, and is electronically available.

On October 3, 2001, President George Bush established a temporary Commission on Excellence in Special Education to collect information and study issues related to Federal, State, and local special education programs with the goal of recommending policies for improving the education performance of students with disabilities. The President's Commission on Excellence in Special Education (PCESE) delivered its report to President Bush on July 1, 2002.

Data on the impact of regional special education programs is varied, and some research suggests results depend on how informed administrators are when making decisions regarding mainstreaming or inclusion programs. One study showed considerable benefit from inclusion in a secondary school, with students reporting a disability as an attribute rather than a stigma. Another showed an increase in baseline standardized test scores among students assigned to a resource room, along with special education teachers reporting dissatisfaction with the quality of special education knowledge among general education teachers and a general feeling of isolation among colleagues. Though, at least one group of special education teachers reported satisfaction in this role, noting that it helped them relate to their students.

Special education programs, when implemented by qualified professionals and competent administrators, have been shown to lead to long-term positive benefits to communities such as students with special needs being able to lead more independent lives, prepared to enter the work force, and develop positive relationships among their peers.

== African-Americans in special education ==
The studies found that grossly disproportionate numbers of minority students are identified as eligible for services, and too often placed in isolated and restrictive educational settings. When compared with their white counterparts, African-American children were almost three times more likely to be labeled "mentally retarded," according to a paper by Thomas B. Parrish, managing research scientist at the American Institutes of Research." New statistics compiled on each state show both over and under-representation of minorities in the categories for "mental retardation," "specific learning disabilities," and "emotional disturbance." African-American students in Connecticut, Mississippi, South Carolina, North Carolina, and Nebraska are more than four times as likely to be identified as "mentally retarded" than white students living in those states. In Florida, Alabama, Delaware, New Jersey, and Colorado, the number of African-American students identified as intellectually disabled was more than three times that of white students. In early childhood education, minority children who live in poverty are most likely to receive a variety of services. A longitudinal study viewed the proclivity of disability and potential disability through three categories. The indicators established were: biological risk, developmental risk, and received Part B services. 62 percent of children were assigned at least one indicator. The Civil Rights Project at Harvard University looked to "identify and solve the problem" of minority children being misplaced in special education. Prompting their research, as shown in the Office for Civil Rights U.S. Department of Education, Elementary and Secondary School Civil Rights Reports (2000), African-American students made up only 17 percent of the total school enrollment; however, 33 percent of these students were classified as intellectually disabled. This displays a large disparity between African-American students and students of other races or ethnicities in special education. The total school enrollment of white students was 63 percent, while only 54 percent of these were classified as intellectually disabled. The total school enrollment of Hispanics was 15 percent; however, they were underrepresented in special education with only 10 percent of their total classified as intellectually disabled. Also, the rate for African-American students identified under emotional disturbance (ED) and specific learning disabilities (SLD) grew significantly. The Civil Rights Project "recognize[s] that concerns about special education are nested in concerns about inequities in education generally".

There are several biases that may influence the way that a teacher or instrument diagnose a child. One type of bias is cultural bias, demonstrated by The Wechsler Intelligence Scale for Children III, which has proved to classify disproportionately more African-Americans that European-Americans as intellectually disabled.

The disproportionate number of African Americans in special education derives not only from a problem in special education, but a problem in the entire system. As Wanda Blanchett describes in her article published in 2006 in Educational Researcher: "White privilege and racism contribute to and maintain disproportionality in special education by (a) insufficiently funding schools attended primarily by African American and poor children; (b) employing culturally inappropriate and unresponsive curricula; and (c) inadequately preparing educators to effectively teach African American learners and other students of color" (Blanchett 24). It is problematic that educators are perpetuating the disproportionate number of African American students in special education when their role is often assumed to be working in the best interests of the students.

African American students in special education are also more likely to be segregated from their non-disabled peers. This problem is often at its worst in large urban school districts. New research has highlighted policies and practices that contribute to the segregation of African-American students in large school districts. A recent case study of a large urban school district and its special education policies revealed: (a) district-level inclusion policies that were broad and provided little guidance to schools; (b) inadequate funding and training that could enable greater inclusion; (c) the maintenance of fully segregated special education schools and special education programs; and (d) legal impediments related to due process complaints of parents (DeMatthews & Mawhinney, 2013).

School psychologists are also involved in the decision-making process as to whether a student should be referred to special education or not. A study published in 2005 showed that school psychologists believed cross-cultural competence was one of the greatest factors in making decisions about students, yet the "self-perceived cross-cultural competence was 36.8 out of a possible 56 points" (Kearns, Ford, Linney 304). This means that school psychologists believed they were only around 66% effective in dealing with the greatest factor for making decisions on behalf of students.

== Bilingual special education ==
Based on 1980 Census and Immigration and Naturalization Services records, it is estimated that there are 79 million school-age language minority children in the United States. This bilingual population is distributed throughout the United States with heavier concentrations in the southwest and northeast. The highest concentration is in the large urban areas.

Considering the overall population with limited English proficiency (LEP) in the United States, a critical question for bilingual special educators is how many of these students also have disabilities. According to the U.S. Office of Special Education, an estimated 948,000 children may both be linguistically different and have disabilities—a substantial population who could benefit from bilingual special education services. In addition, a disproportionate number of minority students are placed in special education. Of particular concern is the over-representation of minority children in particular categories of disability such as "mental retardation" and emotional disturbance.

The educational landscape has changed a great deal since the passage of the individuals with Disabilities Education Improvement Act (IDEA, 2004). More and more states are following a Response to Intervention (RTI) process to decide which students qualify for special education. No longer is eligibility determined by establishing a discrepancy between students' potential, as measured by an intelligence test, and their achievement. Only when a student fails to respond to intervention is he or she referred for special education testing. Thus, RTI addresses some of the long-standing concerns about biased assessment procedures with ELLs (English language learners). Yet RTI tends to be implemented in one-size-fits-all ways that do not adequately take into account the diverse needs of these students (Klingner & Edwards, 2006). And although intelligence tests are not administered with the same frequency as in the past, some problematic assessment procedures continue.

== Sports programs ==
Schools must provide students with disabilities appropriate access to school-sponsored extracurricular activities such as playing on sports teams. This is sometimes done by providing separate programs, such as a wheelchair division for racing, and other times done by having the student with disabilities play alongside students without disabilities. Schools are not required to place unqualified athletes on teams selected through tryouts, and they are not required to change any essential rules of the sports. There are schools that have partnerships with The Special Olympics, a sports organization specifically for students the Special Needs; and sometimes, schools will send their athletes to help out with Special Olympics sports events.

== Transition services ==
The Individuals with Disabilities Education Act of 2004 addresses regulations regarding transition services for children with disabilities. Transition services are designed to focus on improving academic and functional achievement of the child, is based on the individual's needs, and provides instruction and experiences vital for employment and independent living. The goal of transitional services is to prepare students with disabilities for adult living and may provide instruction in functional living skills, social and community skills, work skills and self-advocacy skills. In most states, these services can be provided up to the age of 21 (age 26 in Michigan) or when the student meets his/her goals and objectives, which should be detailed in the student's IEP (Individualized Education Program).

== Future ==
Many schools struggle to appropriately serve students with disabilities due to a lack of resources. One issue is a lack of post high school education programs that help individuals with severe disabilities. Universities across the country have been providing non-academic credit camps at colleges and universities for intellectual disabilities. Such programs attempt to teach individuals who cannot obtain a higher education degree how to successfully live and take care of themselves, while also giving them the education required to apply for careers that interest them.

The most difficult aspect of these programs is the grading criteria, as traditional college grading is too demanding for people unable to meet the academic standards of higher education. Under the Americans with Disabilities Act and 504, higher education facilities can only offer 'reasonable accommodation' to the college students with disabilities admitted for a credit degree program. They cannot offer a separate curriculum.

These programs are working toward having classes with a fixed grading criteria specifically for the students with intellectual disabilities. All of these programs require up to date evaluations on students planning on applying to attend the universities.

== See also ==
- Abuse of special education students
- American Association on Intellectual and Developmental Disabilities
- Early childhood intervention
- National Dissemination Center for Children with Disabilities (NICHCY)

== Bibliography ==
- Losen, Daniel J.; Orfield, Gary (2002). Introduction to Racial Inequality in Special Education. The Civil Rights Project at Harvard University. Harvard Education Press.
