= Post Secondary Transition for High School Students with Disabilities =

The Post Secondary Transition For High School Students with Disabilities refers to the ordinance that every public school district in the United States must provide all students with disabilities ages 3 through 21 with an individualized and free appropriate public education in the least restrictive environment. President Gerald R. Ford established this right when in 1975 he signed Public Law 94-142, the Education of All Handicapped Children Act (EAHCA). Parents of children with disabilities and other advocates hailed EAHCA as the "education civil rights act" for their children. Public education gives students with disabilities the opportunity to succeed in life. Specific language on transition was included in the Individuals with Disabilities Education Act (IDEA) of 1990, and again in the IDEA Amendments of 1997. Special education programs in public schools within the United States receive several different funds through federal and state levels to support the programs.

== History ==
The Act was reauthorized in 1983, 1990, 1997, and 2004. In 1997 the Act was renamed the Individuals with Disabilities Education Act. Most recently, President George W. Bush signed the Act into law on December 3, 2004 (Public Law 108-446).

Public Law 108-446, the Individuals with Disabilities Education Act of 2004, is known as IDEA 2004. Following enactment, the U.S. Department of Education took nearly two years to develop the federal regulations to answer common questions about critical parts of the law. The final draft of the federal regulations were published August 14, 2006, and took effect 60 days later, October 13, 2006. To some extent, the federal regulations clarify how the law should be put into practice. In some areas the final implementation of the law is up to the state educational agencies (SEAs) and local educational agencies (LEAs) - the public school districts.

IDEA 2004 continues granting to students with disabilities the right to a public education. IDEA 2004 continues regulating the special education services provided to these students through the SEAs and the public schools. Most notably, IDEA 2004 emphasizes preparing students with disabilities, ages 16 (or younger) through 21, for life beyond high school.

== From “Get’em In” – to “Get’em Through” – and Now “Get’em Ready!” ==
=== Push-in Vs. Pull-Out Services in Special Education ===
Push-in vs. Pull-out services in Special Education is the way the services are presented at an IEP or 504 meeting and the action of putting your child into them. The law of "Get'em in" to "Get'em through" and now "Get-em ready!" was intended to improve understandings of the needs of students with disabilities. Otherwise known as pull-out and push-in services is to open the doors of public schools to students with disabilities and the services. Pull-out services means specialists that work closely with students outside the general education classroom like instructional support or related services provided in small or individual settings. Some examples include speech therapy, occupational therapy, counseling and reading specialist groups. Push-in services means specialists who work closely inside the general education classroom. Some examples include inclusive education where there is a special education teacher, general education teacher, and others working together like therapists, paraprofessionals, general education students and specialists. Working collaborator together in the classroom provides the students opportunities in general education, inclusively. Pull-in helps students not miss any opportunities in the classroom. Pull-out services can create good opportunities for students who need more one-to-one services but the student can miss out on full class engagements. The overall intent of the law changed over time in keeping with increasingly improved understandings of the needs of students with disabilities. The purpose to get students in services in and out of the school so the ability of life skills is increased.

== Further Underscores Transition ==
IDEA 2004 builds upon the amendments and reauthorizations of 1983, 1990, and 1997, clarifies the concept and position of transition, and strengthens the future-focus of special education services. IDEA 2004 indicates one of its purposes is “…to ensure that all children with disabilities have available to them a free appropriate public education that emphasizes special education and related services designed to meet their unique needs and prepare them for furthereducation, employment and independent living…” (author emphasis). The key word “further” emphasizes the direction and purpose and expected results of this special education legislation. IDEA allows students with disabilities to have an Individualized Education Plan (IEP) in which is "a formal a contract outlining the services and support the school will provide in order for the child to benefit from the educational program". An IEP helps families put their child into the public school system and receive free services during the school day. Some examples of services include, Occupational Therapy, Physical Therapy, Speech Language Pathologists, Behavioral Specialists, Reading and Writing Specialists and more. An IEP is a formal contract that states the students educational goals, their current academic standings and how the student will participate in the general education curriculum. IDEA allows students with disabilities to be in public education from the age of 3 to 21 years old, receiving quality services to improve their academics and unique abilities.

== From Breaking Down the Walls to Looking Beyond the Walls ==
=== Educational Near-Sightedness No Longer ===
No longer will teachers be permitted to restrict their vision of education to the four walls of the classroom and the four years of high school. The focus is on the future. One constraining influence is the ‘other’ education legislation - the No Child Left Behind Act of 2001 (NCLB). NCLB constantly pulls special education services and resources towards standardized testing and improving test scores. IDEA 2004 continuously counteracts by emphasizing individualized education and individualized preparation of individual children with disabilities for their individual lives in their individual communities beyond high school.

IDEA 2004 and the accompanying regulations most clearly reflect the focus on the future through the many uses of the word “transition” when it comes to directing the high school education and activities of children with disabilities: transition, transition planning, transition assessments, transition services, transition service providers.

An effective transition plan, in the eyes of many, drives middle school students’ and high school students’ IEPs Individualized Education Programs (IEPs). IDEA 2004 highlights post secondary goals and putting in place transition services, including courses of study, to facilitate the students’ movement from high school to post high school life.

== EI to ECE Transition in IDEA 2004 ==
Within IDEA 2004, the word “transition” has several different definitions according to its context in the Act. In IDEA 2004, transition describes the process of a young child moving from early intervention services (EI) to early childhood education (ECE). In this EI to ECE process, transition indicates moving young children from one environment, set of services, and service personnel to another: “…the steps to be taken to support the transition of the toddler with a disability to preschool or other appropriate services.” It also indicates moving from one set of entitlements to another, “…a child who is transitioning from Part C of the Act to Part B and is no longer eligible for Part C services because the child has turned 3…” (See .)

== Post Secondary Transition in IDEA 2004 ==
When talking about post secondary transition the context is that students with disabilities have their public education and services on their IEP until the age of 21 years old. Post secondary transition under IDEA allows transition services that are designed to the person and their specific oriented process, taken into the account the child's strengths, preferences, and interests including; Instruction; Related services; Community experiences. Unlike the EI services to ECE transition, the high school students only start in the position of receiving entitlements – entitlements to services. The students who leave, whether by graduation, aging out, or dropping out, leave to a condition of possible eligibility for services, with no guarantee by law that they will continue to receive services. One of the consequences, then, is an urgency to help students with disabilities make the most of the time they are in high school, while some funding, at least, is available, to prepare for post high school life. Before leaving high school, parents have to sit down with their child's IEP team and make life decisions that will be supported by the school system till age of 21. These decisions are hard on parents for where the family is going to send their child next whether it be continuing education, employment, community experiences, or maybe all.

== IDEA 2004 Citations Related to Post Secondary Transition ==
References to the Act and the corresponding regulations within this article on post secondary transition are from FR Doc 06-6656 [Federal Register: August 14, 2006 (Volume 71, Number 156)] [Rules and Regulations [Page 46539-46845] From the Federal Register Online via GPO Access [wais.access.gpo.gov] [DOCID:fr14au06-14]. Please see .

== Transition Services, Post-Secondary Goals, and Transition Assessments ==
When talking about post secondary transition the context is that students with disabilities have their public education and services on their IEP until the age of 21 years old. Post secondary transition under IDEA allows transition services that are designed to the person and their specific oriented process, taken into the account the child's strengths, preferences, and interests including; Instruction; Related services; Community experiences. Unlike the EI services to ECE transition, the high school students only start in the position of receiving entitlements – entitlements to services. The students who leave, whether by graduation, aging out, or dropping out, leave to a condition of possible eligibility for services, with no guarantee by law that they will continue to receive services. One of the consequences, then, is an urgency to help students with disabilities make the most of the time they are in high school, while some funding, at least, is available, to prepare for post high school life. Before leaving high school, parents have to sit down with their child's IEP team and make life decisions that will be supported by the school system till age of 21. These decisions are hard on parents for where the family is going to send their child next whether it be continuing education, employment, community experiences, or maybe all.

These include: “(b) Transition services. Beginning not later than the first IEP to be in effect when the child turns 16, or younger if determined appropriate by the IEP Team, and updated annually, thereafter, the IEP must include--

“(aa) appropriate measurable postsecondary goals based upon age appropriate transition assessments related to training, education, employment, and where appropriate independent living skills;

“(bb) the transition services (including courses of study) needed to assist the child in reaching those goals…”

=== Transition Services ===
Section 300.43 Transition services include:

“(a) Transition services means a coordinated set of activities for a child with a disability that—

“(1) Is designed to be within a results-oriented process, that is focused on improving the academic and functional achievement of the child with a disability to facilitate the child’s movement from school to post-school activities, including postsecondary education, vocational education, integrated employment (including supported employment), continuing and adult education, adult services, independent living, or community participation;

“(2) Is based on the individual child’s needs, taking into account the child’s strengths, preferences, and interests; and includes--

“(i) Instruction;

“(ii) Related services;

“(iii) Community experiences;

“(iv) The development of employment and other post-school adult living objectives; and

“(v) If appropriate, acquisition of daily living skills and provision of a functional vocational evaluation.

“(b) Transition services for children with disabilities may be special education, if provided as specially designed instruction, or a related service, if required to assist a child with a disability to benefit from special education.

“(Authority: 20 U.S.C. 1401(34))”

=== Transition – IEP Participants ===
“b) Transition services participants.

“(1) In accordance with paragraph (a)(7) of this section, the public agency must invite a child with a disability to attend the child's IEP Team meeting if a purpose of the meeting will be the consideration of the postsecondary goals for the child and the transition services needed to assist the child in reaching those goals under Sec. 300.320(b).

“(2) If the child does not attend the IEP Team meeting, the public agency must take other steps to ensure that the child's preferences and interests are considered.

“(3) To the extent appropriate, with the consent of the parents or a child who has reached the age of majority, in implementing the requirements of paragraph (b)(1) of this section, the public agency must invite a representative of any participating agency that is likely to be responsible for providing or paying for transition services.”

=== Parental Consent and Notification ===
“2) For a child with a disability beginning not later than the first IEP to be in effect when the child turns 16, or younger if determined appropriate by the IEP Team, the notice also must

“(i) Indicate--

“(A) That a purpose of the meeting will be the consideration of the postsecondary goals and transition services for the child, in accordance with Sec. 300.320(b); and

“(B) That the agency will invite the student; and

“(ii) Identify any other agency that will be invited to send a representative.

“(2) Parental consent, or the consent of an eligible child who has reached the age of majority under State law, must be obtained before personally identifiable information is released to officials of participating agencies providing or paying for transition services in accordance with Sec. 300.321(b)(3).”

=== Non-LEA Agencies Not Meeting Transition Commitments ===
“(c) Failure to meet transition objectives—

“(1) Participating agency failure. If a participating agency, other than the public agency, fails to provide the transition services described in the IEP in accordance with Sec. 300.320 (b), the public agency must reconvene the IEP Team to identify alternative strategies to meet the transition objectives for the child set out in the IEP.

“(2) Construction. Nothing in this part relieves any participating agency, including a State vocational rehabilitation agency, of the responsibility to provide or pay for any transition service that the agency would otherwise provide to children with disabilities who meet the eligibility criteria of that agency.”

== State Performance Plans Put “Teeth” Into IDEA 2004 Transition Requirements ==
Where’s the teeth? As of 2005, the federal government will monitor transition plans for students with disabilities. The anticipated results of the monitoring will be improvements in the post school results for students with disabilities, made possible through the improvement of in-school educational programs.

=== Monitoring ===
The monitoring will happen through three related vehicles.

State Performance Plan (SPP) (and especially Indicators 1, 2, 13 and 14)

--Annual Performance Report (APR)

--Continuous Improvement Focused Monitoring Process (CIFMP)

Early years of the monitoring focus on establishing a baseline for transition plans, and beyond that the federal and state governments will be using the data collection and analysis results to approve, inform, direct, and assist local school districts in the improvement of their educational programs.

== Transition for Students Means a Transition for Teachers ==
Planning for the future of the individual student often requires a paradigm shift for everyone involved. With the IEP that is in effect the year the student turns 16, the IEPs often make a subtle change from overcoming deficits and approaching developmental norms to post secondary goals, transition plan activities and transition services that capitalize on the students’ strengths, needs, preferences, and interests.

The special education professional community is working hard to catch up with this change in emphasis, and certainly many believe that it has a long way to go. At this point, nearly 6½ million children receive special education services. However, few college programs, like those at the University of Wisconsin Whitewater (see ) are preparing the next generation of professional educators to become effective in the transition planning and preparation process.

== See also ==
- Special education in the United States
