= Disproportionality in special education =

Representation of certain demographics in school systems

Disproportionality in special education is the unequal representation of certain demographic groups in restrictive placement and discipline, particularly in the United States' public school system. Disproportionality is often displayed as the under- or over-representation of specific racial, ethnic, socioeconomic, or culturally and linguistically diverse (CLD) groups in special education compared to their presence in the overall student population. A child's race and ethnicity may significantly influence the likelihood of being misidentified as needing special education services, raising concerns about fairness, equity, and the potential impact on students' educational outcomes.

== Identification ==
There are various concerns regarding the identification of students in special education. The over-identification of students refers to the concern that students of color, particularly African American students, are placed in special education at a higher rate than their white student peers, which can lead to potential stigmatization and negative impacts on their educational experiences. Student under-identification refers to the situation where students of color are less likely to be identified and receive special education services than their white peers who are demonstrating similar behavior, which can lead to students not receiving the necessary support they need to succeed in school.

Students of color are also at risk for misidentification for special education because they are incorrectly identified as having socially undesirable classifications such as emotional disturbance and intellectual disabilities when they may have undiagnosed disabilities, leading to ineffective interventions and supports for these students.

Due to racial or ethnic background, students are likely to be identified as needing special educational resources. Students who are not assertive in classrooms are often overlooked and referred to special schools, unlike their peers, who are assertive as their teacher are unlikely to see their true learning outcomes.

== Monitoring ==
Section 300.646 of Part B of the Individuals with Disabilities Education Act (IDEA) was designed to ensure that each state that receives funding is required to determine if there is disproportionality based on race or ethnicity occurring in the state and Local Education Agencies (LEAs) of the state concerning the identification of children as children with disabilities, the placement in particular educational settings of these children, and the incidence, duration, and type of disciplinary removals from placement, including suspensions and expulsions.

In part B of IDEA, each state receives funding, and the United States Secretary of the Interior must provide the collection and examination of data to determine if significant disproportionality based on race and ethnicity is occurring in the State and the LEAs of the State." In Section 300.64 of the Act, States are required to examine data for significant disproportionality in the following areas:

1. Identifying children with disabilities and their impairment,
2. The child's placement in the educational setting, and
3. Any suspensions or expulsions from school and for how long

IDEA mandates that states collect and examine special education data on race and ethnicity at the district level.

=== State monitoring ===
States have monitored and enforced disproportionality in special education through requirements set in IDEA and the Annual Performance Reports (APRs). At the district level, states are mandated to collect and examine special education data on race and ethnicity. They are also required to report on specific indicators related to disproportionality for students with disabilities and the proportion of districts exhibiting disproportionate representation of racial and ethnic groups in special education.

If states identify significant disproportionality based on race and ethnicity, according to Section 300.464 of Part B of IDEA, they must:

1. Provide for the annual review and, if appropriate, revision of policies, practices, and procedures used in the identification or placement in particular education settings.
2. The LEA must report on revising of policies, practices, and procedures.
3. The State Secretary of the Interior shall require any LEA identified to reserve the maximum amount of funds to provide comprehensive, coordinated intervention services to address the factors contributing to the disproportionality.
4. When implementing intervention services, an LEA can provide professional development and educational and behavioral evaluations, services, and supports.
5. The LEA must identify and address the factors contributing to the disproportionality and economic, cultural, or linguistic barriers to appropriate identification or placement in settings and any policies, practices, or procedures contributing to disproportionality.
6. The LEA must address a policy, practice, or procedure contributing to the disproportionality.

States are not required to identify an LEA with significant disproportionality if the LEA has exceeded the risk ratio threshold but has demonstrated reasonable progress in lowering the risk ratio for the group and category of analysis in each of the two prior consecutive years.

=== Measurement ===
Analytical techniques have been used to research disproportionality in special education, including risk ratio, regression, and multilevel regression. Risk ratio includes exposure to odds, odds ratios, relative risks, and risk indices ratios. Regression models estimate the probability of placement or special education service as a function of independent variables. Multilevel regression nests students within schools, districts, or communities to account for within- and between-cluster estimations. Study findings on disproportionality in special education vary widely across studies because of factors that include using different data sets at different levels, including samples of students at different grades and ages, and applying different analyses that may produce conflicting results.

Qualitative research has involved deductive and inductive methods, including the development of codebooks focusing on the conceptual framework and existing literature on education policy and disproportionality. Quantitative research have coded articles based on the analysis used in each study, such as risk ratio, regression or multi-regression.

=== Effectiveness of current practice ===
There are several areas for improvement in the current practice of monitoring disproportionality. There is inconsistency in the interpretation and implementation of the IDEA provisions by the U.S. Department of Education and Office of Special Education Programs (OSEP), which leads to confusion at the state and local levels hindering the progress in addressing the issue. There is also state and district compliance with procedural aspects of special education identification rather than addressing the systemic factors that contribute to the disproportionality, which may underestimate the true extent of the problem and hinder interventions for students who need them. Although research documents the overrepresentation of students of color in more restrictive environments, the OSEP does not include educational environments in the monitoring and enforcement of disproportionate representation.

The federal interpretation of IDEA statutory language contradicts consistent findings in special education research. Amendments to IDEA in 1997 and 2004 acknowledged the extent of racial and ethnic disproportionality, but federal interpretations of the 2004 requirement have created confusion at the State and LEA levels. Data suggests that the federal interpretation of IDEA 2004, regulatory guidelines, and the design of indicators for monitoring and enforcement have been ineffective in addressing racial and ethnic disproportionality.

== Significant disproportionality ==
If significant disproportionality based on race or ethnicity is found, then according to Section 300.646 of Part B of IDEA, the states must provide an annual review of revisions of policies, practices, and procedures regarding the placement of these children in educational settings (including disciplinary actions to ensure they comply with the act and require the LEA to report any revisions.

Significant disproportionality, as per IDEA Section 618(d), refers to a substantial disparity based on race and ethnicity in the state and the LEAs regarding the identification of children with disabilities, their placements in certain education settings, and the incidence duration and type of disciplinary actions. Disproportionate representation, as per IDEA Section 616(a)(3)(C), refers to the overrepresentation or underrepresentation of racial and ethnic groups in special education and related services that is the result of inappropriate identification. The significant disproportionality regulations do not apply to or address the obligation to identify disproportionate representation due to inappropriate identification under IDEA Section 616(a)(3)(C).

IDEA's section 618(d) requires states to collect and examine data to determine if significant disproportionality based on race and ethnicity is occurring in the state and the LEAs of the state with respect to the identification of children with disabilities, the placement in the particular education setting, and the incidence, duration, and type of disciplinary actions, including expulsion.

If states identify significant disproportionality based on race and ethnicity, they must take several actions according to Section 300.646 of Part B of IDEA:

1. Provide for an annual review and revision of policies, practices, and procedures used in identifying students with significant disabilities to ensure that they comply with the requirements of the Act.
2. Require the LEA to publicly report on the revision of policies, practices, and procedures.
3. Implement comprehensive, coordinated intervening services, including professional development and educational and behavioral evaluations.
4. The LEA must identify and address the factors contributing to the significant disproportionality.
5. The LEA must address the policy, practice, or procedure it identifies as contributing to the significant disproportionality.

== Racial/ethnic disproportionality ==
The root causes of racial and ethnic disproportionality in special education referrals may be attributed to deficit thinking related to conceptions of race and socioeconomic status, inadequate institutional safeguards, teachers' perceptions of students' ability, and lack of policies and interventions in schools. Economic and demographic variables, cultural mismatch, unequal opportunities in general education, and racial discrimination may also contribute to the disproportional representation of minority students. Students from racial, cultural, ethnic, and linguistic minority backgrounds are more likely to be labeled as disabled at a higher frequency and removed from mainstream education. In addition, students from disadvantaged backgrounds and students of color are more likely to be taught by inexperienced teachers in poorly funded schools.

The structural nature of race in the United States is an important factor in understanding special education referral patterns. Economic, education level and school desegregation policies contribute to disproportionality. Overrepresentation of students of color tends to increase as a racial or ethnic minority group constitutes a larger percentage of their state's population. School professionals involved in decision-making (i.e., referrals, assessment, and eligibility meetings for special education placement) mediate disproportionality.

Students of color often attend schools with limited resources and high levels of disadvantage, which leads to disproportionate reliance on special education placements for these students. Historically underserved groups in America, such as African Americans, Latinos, and Native Americans, are disproportionately represented in high-incidence disability categories (i.e., intellectual disability, autism spectrum disorders, traumatic brain injury, language disorder, behavior disorders, learning disabilities, and attention deficit hyperactivity disorder), and that school culture and the cultural histories of students and their families collide and are often thought of as an intrinsic part of them. Racial and ethnic disparities are typically found less frequently in "hard" disability categories (i.e., hearing impairment, visual impairment, or orthopedic impairment) and more often in "soft" disability categories (i.e., intellectual disabilities, emotional and behavioral disorders, or learning disabilities)).

Individual, contextual, and systemic factors contribute to disproportionality in special education. Understanding disproportionality in special education involved categorizing root causes into distinct factors, each contributing to the complex issue. These categories shed light on the nuanced challenges faced by students of color:

=== Teacher bias ===
The relationship between families and schools may look different from one school to another, contributing to inconsistencies in findings on disproportionality. Educator bias can contribute to disproportionality by teachers misinterpreting cultural, language, and dialectical differences as deficits, leading to students of color being misidentified as having learning disabilities. These biases can shift attention away from other social inequities that could impact the learning rate and other disabilities among specific populations.

Interpretations of behaviors by teachers from different cultural backgrounds can disadvantage students of color because it leads to subjective disciplinary actions by staff. In addition to students of color being over-identified, the under-identification of these students may occur despite demonstrating similar academic performance to white students. Teachers need to take an intersectional view of students, use restorative justice strategies in their classrooms, be educated on students' cultural practices, and increase parent and community involvement in education.

=== School policies and procedures ===
The processes of referral and identification of students for special education can be influenced by biases and judgements leading to the overrepresentation of students of color. Disproportionality can also be seen in school discipline policies by subjecting harsher disciplinary actions to students of color with disabilities. Instructional practices and academic expectations set by the school can contribute by expecting lower and less rigorous instruction for students of color, leading to the underperformance of these groups of students and referrals to special education. Additionally, the way schools allocate resources can contribute to disproportionality in that schools with fewer resources, often in underserved neighborhoods with children of color, may be more likely to place students in special education as a means to secure additional funding. Many schools also focus on compliance with laws, especially those in IDEA, which can lead to a narrow focus on procedural aspects of special education identification, rather than addressing systemic contributions of disproportionality.

=== Environmental factors ===
Many students of color who have been identified for special education services come from disadvantaged communities and are more likely to be exposed to environmental toxins (i.e., lead, mercury, and other harmful chemicals), which have been linked to learning disabilities and could negatively impact their learning and development. Access to resources that contribute to healthy brain development (i.e., healthcare, good nutrition, high-quality early childhood education, and early childhood intervention) is often inequitable, and lack of access to these resources can compound learning difficulties later in life, leading to overrepresentation of students of color in special education.

=== Systemic issues ===
Systemic inequalities place students of color at a heightened risk for special education placement. The overrepresentation of students of color in special education may be due to contributing to systemic issues. Schools often use a white middle-class referent as the norm for evaluating student behavior and achievement, which can disadvantage students of color because they may be viewed as more aggressive, leading to more disciplinary referrals and special education placements. Additionally, referring to the white middle-class experience ignores the fact that cultural communities within the United States create goals and promote their children's development contingent on context-specific opportunities and constraints when they should be examined in light of complex adaptation and accommodation processes to ecological contingencies. Once these students are labeled as special education students, they are more likely to face exclusionary disciplinary actions. Students of color often attend underfunded, under-resourced schools with lower teacher quality; when they attend predominately white schools, they are often re-segregated into remedial courses, which impacts their achievement due to lower standards and poor instruction.

There are concerns that students of color in low economic areas may be more likely to receive special education services in segregated settings, creating barriers to typical academic success. Students in these low economic areas are more likely to attend schools with inadequate funding, teacher training, and overall low expectations of the students.

Although race and poverty are at the heart of systemic issues, addressing systemic inequities within the education system may have more of an impact on disproportionality and the overrepresentation of students of color in special education.

==== Policies that contribute ====
Specific education policies and laws that contribute to racial disparities are often embedded in school disciplinary actions and special education assignments. For example, Zero-tolerance policies, which mandate predetermined punishments for specific offenses, disproportionately affect students of color. These policies often result in suspensions and expulsions for these students, which is one of the most prominent indicators of placement in special education. The implementation of these education policies and laws is often influenced by institutional racism, leading to a disproportionate impact on students of color.

There are systemic patterns of disproportionality that are embedded within the educational system that are often perpetuated by seemingly "neutral" policies that lead to race-laden outcomes. This suggests that the racial disparities related to disproportionality in special education are deeply embedded within the structures and policies of the education system and not merely the result of individual biases or actions.

=== Factors that influence special identification ===
Gender, race, socioeconomic status, and the number of suspensions are the most consistent predictors of special identification placement. Specifically, male students from low-income family backgrounds are at the highest risk in most disability categories. Additionally, the number of suspensions a student has could influence their risk of being identified for special education.

== Role of historical inequality ==
Historical inequality in America plays a significant role in current educational inequality. The historical legacy of racism and white supremacy persists with segregation occurring within and between schools, which shapes racial disparities, including racial disproportionality in special education. The history of racial segregation processes that situate minority groups contrasted with the dominant majority culture. These issues take into account the historical patterns of racial and socioeconomic segregation of the United States and how the patterns can reinforce perceptions of "the other." The beliefs about the desirability and undesirability of spaces within a school district were socially and culturally constructed in ways that were detrimental to students of color in the school district. Historical inequalities may be perpetuated in the ways educators, families, and communities function in ways that may exclude students and families of color from their education and decision-making process.

Historically, development has been universalized, positioning white middle-class children as the norm by which the development of all children is evaluated, failing to recognize the cultural differences in development and overlooking how schools construct disabilities. If students of color were evaluated under different contexts, various developmental expressions may signal competencies in these students instead of deficits.

The global agenda encompassed in Education for All (EFA) initiatives recognizes that effective access to education can not be achieved without addressing the rights of disabled people worldwide.

== Strategies for reducing disproportionality ==
IDEA aims to protect the rights of students with disabilities. Yet despite these explicit goals that are set by the Act, significant inequities persist, particularly for racially, linguistically, and economically diverse students with disabilities. Therefore, the pursuit of equity and justice in education involves critically examining policies and how they are enacted in practice by understanding these policies across deferent people and contexts.

To ensure consistent enforcement of the IDEA provisions, the government can provide clear definitions of "disproportionality" so that every school understands what the term means to strengthen enforcement policy. Schools can provide early intervention and prevention strategies that target and support at-risk students with academic and behavioral difficulties. Schools can also implement a multi-tiered system of support (MTSS) and Response to Intervention (RTI) framework that includes universal screening, evidence-based interventions, and progress monitoring to reduce the overidentification of students of color.

Other strategies for reducing disproportionality for teachers and school professionals include

- Culturally responsive teaching, where instructional practices that acknowledge and value students' cultural backgrounds and experiences are honored. Teaching methods and materials should be relevant and inclusive for all students, especially culturally and linguistically diverse students.
- Implicit bias training for school professionals to raise awareness of unconscious biases and stereotypes that may influence their perceptions and decision-making processes.
- There should be collaboration and communication among teachers, administrators, and families to ensure all stakeholders are involved in decision-making processes regarding students and ensure that students' needs are properly addressed.
- Increasing teacher diversity and training of the teaching workforce to reflect the student population better and provide training on cultural competence and implicit bias to all educators.
- Implementing Universal Design for Learning principles to help create inclusive classrooms that accommodate the needs of all students may reduce the need for special education referrals.
- Providing early intervention services to help identify and address learning difficulties before they escalate to reduce the overrepresentation of students of color in special education placements.
- Ensuring all students have access to quality education and healthcare resources to help address underlying issues contributing to learning difficulties.
- Engaging parents and the communities in which students reside in the education process to help ensure that students' needs are identified and addressed may help reduce the stigma about special education.
- Addressing historical legacies of inequality.
- Research to explore how different demographic, school, family, and community factors may produce under- or overrepresentation in special education.

=== Recommendations regarding IDEA to reduce disproportionality ===
- Federal and state efforts should focus on identifying, addressing, and preventing a range of issues that may contribute to disproportionate representation, including shifting the monitoring of the SEA and LEA practices from narrow focuses on compliance with procedures of eligibility determination to a broadened focus on factors such as general education, which has been identified as contributing to disproportionality in special education.
- Data analyses and monitoring which includes data on referrals, placements, and students' outcomes, to identify patterns of disproportionality and inform targeted interventions and supports for struggling students.
- Implementing a standardized process for identifying students for special education reduces the impact of bias, and ensures that all students who need services receive them.
- Policymakers should consider revising policies that contribute to disproportionality (i.e., discipline policies).
- Long-term efforts should focus on increasing the availability of research on intervention approaches and improved teaching training in cultural competence.
- Requiring states to be prevented from defining disproportionality in ways that minimize or mask the identification of true disparities.
- Combining the terms and descriptors of "disproportionate representation" and "significant disproportionality" under IDEA 2004, they have never been separate constructs in research or practice.
- Critical disability education policy that accounts for sociocultural context in an effort to move toward more just and equitable education policies.
- Developing and implementing policies that provide clear guidelines to promote equity in education.

=== Early intervention ===
The U.S. Department of Education states that it emphasizes the importance of providing individualized and appropriate supports to ensure that children with disabilities have access to high-quality early childhood programs. The Department presumes that the first placement option considered for a preschool child diagnosed with a disability is the regular public preschool program the child would attend, given that the child did not have a disability. If this is done, children of color diagnosed with disabilities will not be educated in separate or segregated environments. The removal of children diagnosed with disabilities is only to be separate from the regular educational environment when the nature of the severity of the disability is such that education in regular classes with the use of supports and services cannot be achieved. Children must be provided a Free Appropriate Public Education (FAPE) in the Least Restrictive Environment (LRE) where a child with disabilities' needs are met starting in the general education placement with non-disabled peers.

== Inconsistencies in disproportionality ==
Discrepancies and challenges characterize disproportionality studies across school districts and states, which reveals the inconsistencies in understanding and addressing the issue. There are technical, compliance-oriented approaches in policies that attempt to address racial disparities without considering the ways the policies are entangled with complex contextual factors such as race, ethnicity, gender, socioeconomic status, and language status in students of color. Overrepresentation in one racial group in a disability category may occur in one state, while underrepresentation may occur for that racial group in a different disability category, showing the complexity of the issue of disproportionality.

There is a lack of a critical disability education policy approach, which makes it difficult to account for complex sociocultural contexts that attend to disability and its intersections in an effort to move toward more equitable educational policies. Despite numerous studies and debates, understanding the complexities of disproportionality in special education identification remains limited.

== Stigmatization and disproportionality ==
While special education identification is supposed to allocate support services for students with disabilities, the intersection of stigmatization and disproportionality in special education accentuates the negative consequences of labeling and segregation, particularly for students of color. The act of labeling and assigning intellectual, physical, or emotional disabilities not only stigmatizes students socially but has profound implications for their families, especially within certain cultural communities.

The labeling process, along with the segregation into separate classrooms, exacerbates the identifiability of these students, perpetuating stigmatization. Beyond the social aspect, this stigmatization can hinder post-school outcomes and limit the potential of students of color.

Students with disabilities experience social isolation more than their peers who are not disabled. This is a result of communication gaps and physical barriers. Students with speech or hearing impairments find it difficult to communicate with peers.

Stigma contributes negatively to the learning outcomes of students with learning disabilities. This continues to delay the academic ability of students with special education, which affected the implementation of accommodated classroom changes that can provide an inclusive classroom setting for all students. Special education students require specialized settings and teachers in order to succeed. This results in labelling them as a separate group. Within general classrooms, students with learning disabilities are affected by how they are perceived due to various biases from teachers and parents. Lower academic expectations are given to Student with learning disabilities compared to their peers who do not require special education.

Studies indicate that the rate of growth in special education is higher in areas where schools receive additional resources for each student when compared with areas where funding is based on historical enrollments.

=== Intersectionality and disability ===
Students with disabilities are positioned within society at the intersection of race, ethnicity, class, language, and sexuality. Since many frame students with disabilities from a deficit perspective, the intersectionality of disability with race, ethnic, class, language, and sexuality can lead to multiple layers of discrimination by race and disability. Additionally, the intersection of disability with other social identities can influence students' educational experiences and outcomes. Institutional expectations based on inappropriate non-intersectional contexts can limit the opportunities for meaningful intervention for these students.

In African countries, children with disabilities are more likely to never be enrolled in schools due to various gaps. The lack of adequate infrastructure for children with disabilities is one such factor. Most schools do not have the required resources to invest in the education of children with disabilities to easily learn alongside their peers who are without disabilities. Insufficient training of teachers on inclusive education also leads to stigma to students with special education. Due to the cost of special education, students with disabilities are likely to be rejected in general schools.
