= Mainstreaming (education) =

Placing disabled students in regular classrooms

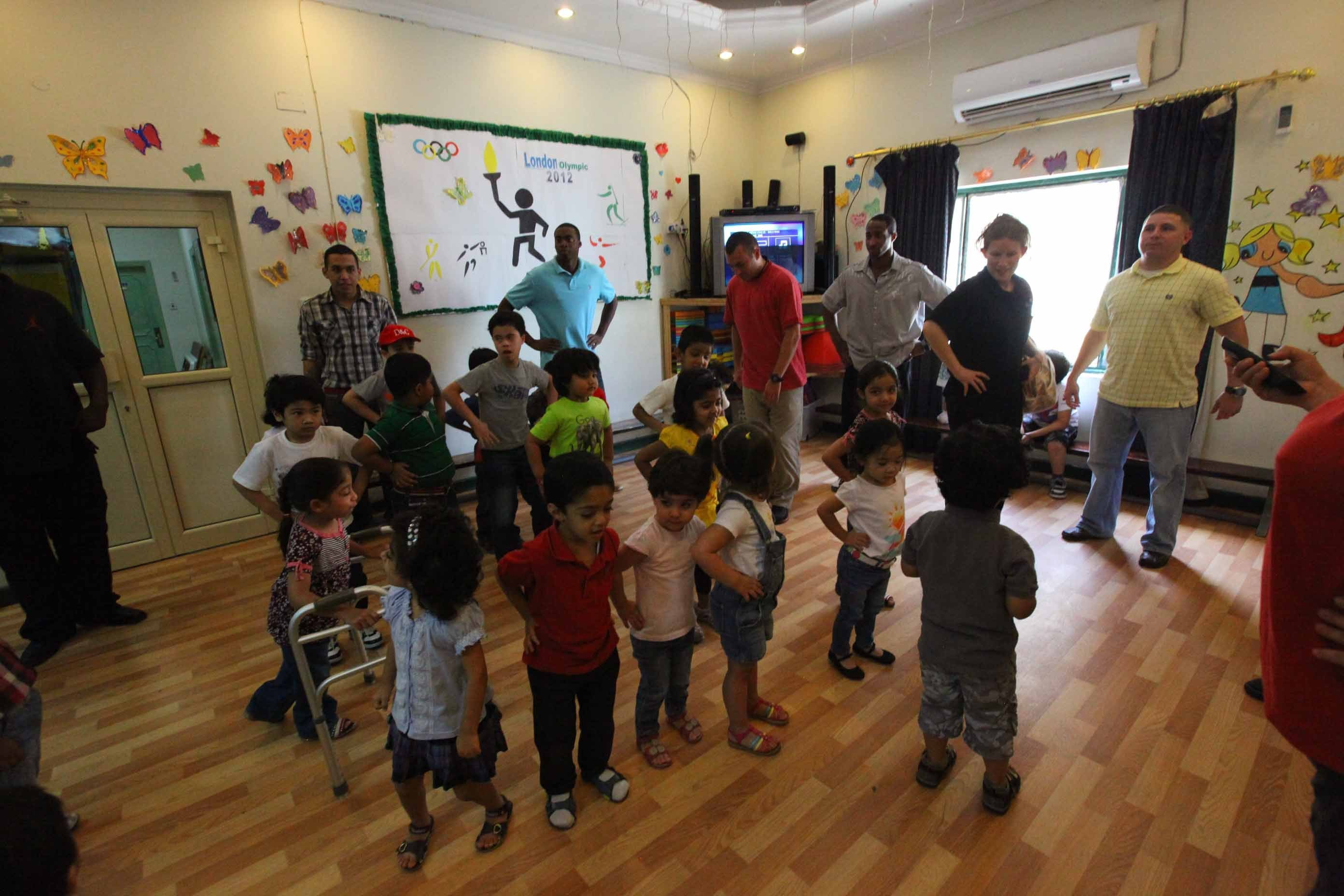

Mainstreaming, in the context of education, is the practice of placing students with special needs in a general education classroom during specific time periods based on their skills. This means students who are a part of the special education classroom will join the regular education classroom at certain times which are fitting for the special education student. These students may attend art or physical education in the regular education classrooms. Sometimes these students will attend math and science in a separate classroom, but attend English in a general education classroom. Schools that practice mainstreaming believe that students with special needs who cannot function in a general education classroom to a certain extent belong in the special education environment.

Access to a special education classroom, mostly called a "separate classroom or resource room", is valuable to the student with a disability. Students have the ability to work one-to-one with special education teachers, addressing any need for remediation during the school day. Many researchers, educators and parents have advocated the importance of these classrooms amongst political environments that favor their elimination.

Oftentimes mainstreamed students will have certain supports they will bring to the general education classroom. A common support is to bring a one-on-one aide to assist them. Other equipment may be tools from their special education classroom that assist them in keeping up with the demands of the general education classroom. This may be a device that helps a deaf student communicate with their peers, a special chair for a student diagnosed with Down syndrome, or a special desk for a student that is in a wheelchair. Some of these students may need accommodations on assignments or tests.

Proponents of both the philosophy of educational inclusion assert that educating children with disabilities alongside their non-disabled peers fosters understanding and tolerance, better preparing students of all abilities to function in the world beyond school. Children with special needs may face social stigma as a result of being mainstreamed, but also may help them socially develop.

There is often much confusion between the terms mainstreaming and inclusion. Often these terms are used interchangeably, but they mean two very different things. Mainstreamed students are part of the special education classroom. When they enter the regular education classroom for certain subjects, this is considered mainstreaming. In comparison, inclusion students are regular education classroom students who receive special education services. The determination of whether a student's education is mainstreamed or inclusive is often based on which setting constitutes the least restrictive environment, as specified in the student's individualized education program (IEP). Dr. Kenneth Shore comments on the least restrictive environment by claiming, "Determining what is the least restrictive environment for a particular student requires balancing the need for the child to learn to integrate socially with his non-disabled peers with the need for the child to receive instruction appropriate to his abilities."

== Advantages ==
=== Benefits to students with disabilities ===
- Higher academic achievement: Mainstreaming has shown to be more academically effective than exclusion practices. For instance, the National Center for Learning Disabilities found that the graduation rate for students with learning disabilities was 70.8% for the 2013-2014 year, although this report does not differentiate between students enrolled in mainstreaming, inclusive, or segregated programs. Access to a resource room for direct instruction has shown to be effective in increasing students' academic skills and thus increasing the abilities applied by students in a general education setting. Compared to full-time placement in a special education class or special school, both part-time and full-time placement in the regular classroom have been shown to improve academic achievement in students with mild academic disabilities, as well as to improve their long-term behavior.
- Better social skills: Any kind of inclusion practice, including mainstreaming, allows students with disabilities to learn social skills through observation, gain a better understanding of the world around them, and become a part of the "regular" community. Mainstreaming is particularly beneficial for children with autism and ADHD. By interacting with same-aged non-disabled children, children with autism were observed to be six times more likely to engage in social relations outside of the classroom. Because children with autism spectrum disorders have severely restricted interests and abnormalities in communication and social interaction, the increased interaction with typical children may be beneficial to them. The same 1999 study showed that students with Down syndrome were three times more likely to communicate with other people.

Mainstreaming also benefits other children. It opens the lines of communication between those students with disabilities and their peers. If they are included into classroom activities, all students become more sensitive to the fact that these students may need extra assistance.

=== Benefits to non-disabled students ===
There is research that suggests that educating non-disabled students and students with disabilities together creates an atmosphere of understanding and tolerance that better prepares students of all abilities to function in the world beyond school. Students without disabilities who engaged in an inclusive physical education program reported increases in self-concept, tolerance, self-worth, and a better understanding of other people. The students also reported that the inclusion program was important because it prepared them to deal with disability in their own lives. Positive aspects that come from inclusion are often attributed to contact theory. Contact theory asserts that frequent, meaningful, and pleasant interactions between people with differences tend to produce changes in attitude.

== Disadvantages ==
Although mainstreaming in education has been shown to provide benefits, there are also disadvantages to the system.

=== Tradeoff with non-disabled students' academic education ===
One potentially serious disadvantage to mainstreaming is that a mainstreamed student may require much more attention from the teacher than non-disabled students in a general class. Time and attention may thus be taken away from the rest of the class to meet the needs of a single student with special needs. The effect that a mainstreamed student has on the whole class depends strongly on the particular disabilities in question and the resources available for support. In many cases, this problem can be mitigated by placing an aide in the classroom to assist the student with special needs, although this raises the costs associated with educating this child. The added cost of an aide in a classroom to meet needs of special education students can be offset by not funding a teacher in a wholly separate classroom when mainstreaming does not occur.

Teachers are encouraged to teach the entire class differently. This includes being less abstract and more concrete in content, changing lighting, simplifying the design of the classroom, and having a predictable structure and routine rather than novelty.

=== Harm to the academic education of students with disabilities ===
Some research has suggested that teachers who are not aware of students' special needs, later may choose not to adopt the required modifications. More so, they develop higher resistance to having these students in class. This however can lead to regression of the students with disabilities as well as an overall decrease in classroom productivity.

=== Teacher–student interactions ===
It has been seen that general educators provide 98.7% of their teaching time doing whole class interactions. Students with disabilities have been known to require a significant more amount of individual attention with the classroom teacher. Children with disabilities spend twice as much time in whole-class activities as in one-to-one activities due to the amount of whole-class teaching, yet these students are half as likely to engage in whole-class learning activities such as writing, reading and participating, showing that whole group activities do not meet the needs of students with disabilities as much as individual work would. It is reported that mainstreamed students receive a larger proportion of the classroom teachers' total time than regular education students. However this did not result in an increase in academic instructional time. Mainstreamed students in low-ability classes receive more nonacademic correction from the classroom teacher compared to mainstreamed students in average and above-average classes or regular education students. Resulting in students with special education needs (SEN) spending 25% of their time working outside of the classroom, and a reduction of teacher interaction in a whole class setting from 30% to 22%. Therefore, mainstreamed students will spend time in a resource room where they can receive more individualized attention from teachers. In contrast, there has been an increase of the number of teaching assistants (TAs) in mainstream primary settings to assist the learning and inclusion of students with SEN. Interactions with TAs has become an integral part of educational experience for students with SEN, resulting in TA interactions comprising up to a fifth of all observations students with SEN experience. Observations show that the higher the level of student SEN, the more likely it is that the student will interact more with a TA than their classroom teacher. A survey conducted in the UK (2000), composed of 300 teachers found that two-thirds of students with SEN were regularly working with TAs for an average of 3.7 hours per week. Therefore, the use of TAs to support students with SEN has become an established part of academics in a mainstream setting, and interactions with TAs comprise a key part of their day-to-day classroom experience. The survey concluded that TAs were used as alternative to teacher support, which has shown to result in unintended and troubling consequences for students with SEN. It is suggested that the inclusion of TAs in the mainstream classroom to support students with SEN has resulted in the educational experience of these students diverging from the non-SEN student, which then raises concerns about how schools choose to provide support for students with SEN.

=== Social issues ===
Compared to fully included students with disabilities, those who are mainstreamed for only certain classes or certain times may feel conspicuous or socially rejected by their classmates. They may become targets for bullying. Mainstreamed students may feel embarrassed by the additional services they receive in a regular classroom, such as an aide to help with written work or to help the student manage behaviors. Some students with disabilities may feel more comfortable in an environment where most students are working at the same level or with the same supports. In the United States, students with autistic spectrum disorders are more frequently the target of bullying than non-autistic students, especially when their educational program brings them into regular contact with non-autistic students. Also, special-needs students can easily get lost in a regular education classroom. In some cases they may be disruptive and may compromise the learning environment of other students.

As seen above, there are many social issues; however, a buddy system has been shown to improve these issues. Through having a buddy system an upper school student will be paired with a younger child with a disability. By doing this the younger student is provided with a positive relationship with a fellow student. The buddy system aims to have the younger student learn the benefits of having and sustaining a positive and supportive friendship. Social issues are improved due to the upper school student helping to alter the social experiences of the younger child through this formed friendship.

=== Costs ===
Schools are required to provide special education services but may not be given additional financial resources. A 2005 study conducted by the Special Education Expenditures Program (SEEP) showed that the cost of educating a special-needs student is between $10,558 and $20,000. In comparison, educating a student who does not need special education services costs $6,556. The average expenditure for educating students with special-needs is 1.6 times that of a general education student.

=== Special consequences for deaf students ===
Deafness is a low-incidence disability, which means that a deaf child will often be the only student in the classroom with hearing loss. This leads to a special set of issues in the mainstream classroom. While students with other disabilities may experience isolation and bullying by their non-disabled peers, they often share a common language. This is not the case for deaf students. Very few people in the mainstream academic setting know sign language, which means the communication barrier is large and can have negative effects on both academic achievement and social development.

- Social skills are key to a child's healthy development and later success as an adult. Although many studies find good academic results for deaf children placed in a mainstream classroom, research also shows that mainstreamed deaf children experience higher degrees of isolation and psychological problems in comparison to deaf students who associate with other deaf peers. In order for friendships to form, communication is a necessity. For deaf children unable to use effective communication methods with the people around them, the difficulty in acquiring new friendships typically leads to isolation and a decrease in self-esteem. A study of preschool children showed that hearing preschoolers did not appear to adjust how they communicated with deaf children. Instead, they continued to use simple speech, which was effective with hearing, but not deaf, partners. This shows the isolation of the deaf child, and discredits the idea that the hearing and deaf child's communication skills will be enhanced by interaction with one another. In many cases, hearing children do not understand what it means when another child is deaf. This leads to frustration when a deaf child's speech is not clear or when the deaf child asks for continuous repetition. Communication strategies that are culturally acceptable to the deaf child, such as banging on a table or physically touching another person, can also cause the deaf child to be rejected by his or her peers because such behaviors are not always considered acceptable in mainstreaming hearing culture. Research has suggested that the placement of a deaf child in special schools or classes may be more desirable for deaf students than for those with other disabilities. This is primarily because of the greater social benefits for the students.
- The residual knowledge that hearing children can access is often lost on deaf children. A hearing child can listen in on adult conversations, TV, radio and the news to learn things that are not specifically taught or told to them. This is not the case with the deaf child, who, in a hearing environment, can only learn what is directly communicated to them. This often leads to gaps in general knowledge, which can be both harmful to academic success and social interactions.
- The effect of mainstreaming on Deaf culture is also a key issue for Deaf culture advocates. The rate of children enrolled in residential schools for the deaf is declining, as many hearing parents send their child to a mainstream school in hopes of preparing their child for life in the hearing world. In the past, Deaf schools and clubs served as the center for Deaf culture. Traditions, stories, and values developed and were fostered in these settings, but because of the low incidence of deafness, this same environment cannot be duplicated in the mainstream setting. Aside from the decreased socialization of a deaf child in a hearing school, Deaf community advocates also worry that the disappearance of residential Deaf schools will lead to a weakening of Deaf culture and of the community.

== Alternatives: what mainstreaming is not ==
The alternatives to mainstreaming for students in special education are separation, inclusion, and excluding the student from school. Normally, the student's individual needs are the driving force behind selecting mainstreaming or another style of education.

Mainstreaming does not involve putting a child full-time in a special school.

Mainstreaming does not involve placing a child full-time in a regular classroom. A student who spends the entire day in a regular classroom with non-disabled peers is considered fully included. Most students with mild levels of disabilities such as dyslexia or attention deficit disorder, or with non-cognitive disabilities such as diabetes are fully included.

Mainstreaming does not involve teaching the child outside of school. A student who is taught in an institution (such as a hospital) or at home (such as while recovering from a serious illness) is excluded. Such a student may receive individual instruction or may attend small group instruction. A student who is excluded from school may or may not have been expelled from the school.

== History of mainstreaming in US schools ==
Before the Education for All Handicapped Children Act (EHA) was enacted in 1975, U.S. public schools educated only 1 out of 5 children with disabilities. Approximately 200,000 children with disabilities such as deafness or general learning disability lived in state institutions that provided limited or no educational or rehabilitation services, and more than a million children were excluded from school. Another 3.5 million children with disabilities attended school but did not receive the educational services they needed. Many of these children were segregated in special buildings or programs that neither allowed them to interact with non-disabled students nor provided them with even basic academic skills.

The EHA, later renamed the Individuals with Disabilities Education Act (IDEA), required schools to provide specialized educational services to children with disabilities. The ultimate goal was to help these students live more independent lives in their communities, primarily by mandating access to the general education standards of the public school system.

Initially, children with disabilities were often placed in heterogeneous "special education" classrooms, making it difficult for any of their difficulties to be addressed appropriately. In the 1980s, the mainstreaming model began to be used more often as a result of the requirement to place children in the least restrictive environment (Clearinghouse, E. 2003). Students with relatively minor disabilities were integrated into regular classrooms, while students with major disabilities remained in segregated special classrooms, with the opportunity to be among non-disabled students for up to a few hours each day. Many parents and educators favored allowing students with disabilities to be in classrooms along with their nondisabled peers.

In 1997, IDEA was modified to strengthen requirements for properly integrating students with disabilities. The IEPs must more clearly relate to the general-education curriculum, children with disabilities must be included in most state and local assessments, such as high school exit exams, and regular progress reports must be made to parents. All public schools in the U.S. are responsible for the costs of providing a Free Appropriate Public Education as required by federal law. Mainstreaming or inclusion in the regular education classrooms, with supplementary aids and services if needed, are now the preferred placement for all children. Children with disabilities may be placed in a more restricted environment only if the nature or severity of the disability makes it impossible to provide an appropriate education in the regular classroom.

== Mainstreaming context in other countries ==
=== Australian context ===
It has been estimated that in 2009 there were 292,600 children attending school in Australia that had been diagnosed with a disability within the same year. It has been noted that there had been a higher rate of participation within school activities coming from children with a disability compared to children without one. It has been shown that almost one in ten boys within schools (186,000) had been diagnosed with a disability where the number of girls within a school (106,600) diagnosed with a disability was around one in sixteen. Within mainstream schools it has been shown that primary schools had a higher number of students with disabilities with a high 9.1% where students within secondary schools where only 7.4% had a disability. Out of the 71,000 students attending school with a disability, 64.7% have been known to have a severe or core-activated limitation. It has also been proven that special needs children within Australia demonstrate higher academic outcomes when in a mainstream school where they have been given opportunities to engage in higher academic levels and activities. Having children with a disability in a mainstream school has also been shown to increase in independent communication and motor skills.

In Australia there has been a slight shift away from mainstream schools since 2003. Students with disability have begun to attend specials schools at an increasing rate instead of participating in mainstream programs in schools. By 2015, there was an increase of 33% of students with disability attended a special school. Students with disability attending mainstream schools had decreased by 22% in the same time frame. This change in school attendance is likely a reflection of experiences students with disability are having in each respective type of school. Students with disability could be finding special schools to have more adequate support for the severity or type of disability they have. Students with disability are still more commonly attending mainstreaming schools, despite the current shift towards special schools. This preference could be accredited to the improvement within the Australian education system when mainstreaming students regarding providing students with resources and tailored supports.

=== Sri Lanka Context ===
Access to special education for students with disabilities were introduced to Sri Lanka with the General Education Reforms of 1997. This piece of legislation includes 19 reforms that improved the development of curricula and teacher training, in addition to special education access. The changes made in Sri Lanka's education system that were created by this reform were to allow students to have wider spread access to special education using mainstreaming programs. In 2000, the majority of classes offered for students with disabilities were only accessible in special education units. During the same time period, children with disabilities who were of school age did not or were not able to access education at very high rates. Boys with disabilities accessed education at a higher rate than girls, with boys having a rate of 59.5% and only 40.5% for girls.

The Convention on the Rights of Persons with Disabilities (CRPD) was finally ratified in Sri Lanka in 2016, which was a step in the right direction regarding the importance and rights of disabled students in the classroom. Though Sri Lanka mainstreaming programs have the intention for inclusion of students with disabilities into mainstream education, the country of Sri Lanka has not yet made enough considerable progress to implement any type of effective disability rights law. This has led to a lack of framework for mainstreaming programs, as well as rights, for disabled students in this country.

A major issue in Sri Lanka when attempting to implement mainstreaming education is the confusion regarding what mainstreaming is. There is a lack of clarity regarding the terminology including how terms such as inclusion and integration are used interchangeably. The issues regarding the lack of direction and understanding with mainstreaming programs stems from the newness of such programs in Sri Lanka. Teachers in Sri Lanka find that when working in mainstreaming classrooms they are underprepared to manage students with disabilities as they were not taught mainstreaming strategies when they were pre-service or in-service training. The education system in Sri Lanka is additionally lacking in teaching support in the classroom and little collaboration between teachers and special education teachers in schools. To create a productive mainstreaming environment, these factors must be addressed and corrected in order to improve on mainstreaming programs in Sri Lanka.

=== China Context ===
The idea of inclusive education became the approach and primary focus in education toward the end of Mao Tse-tung's era. This reform came with many challenges, such as non-accepting school cultures, inadequate teacher preparation, and lack of or insufficient resources. This geographic area had been subjected to so many issues dealing with the economy and socialization. The issues were due to the rapid changes that were being made within the country. The attempts that were made during this reform in education caused problems because the country was so unique with its history, politics, and culture.

China did not have schools for individuals with disabilities until the American and European missionaries established institutions for the blind and deaf. This started in Beijing and Shandong Province in the nineteenth century. In 1949, the People's Republic of China (PRC) was founded and had a population of over 450 million. There were only 42 special schools with around 2,000 students attending. The students attending these special schools had hearing or vision impairments. Thirty-four of the schools were private and were managed by religious or charitable organizations. These facilities represented more of a residential home environment. During the 1950s education became the challenge of focus and during the next twenty-five years the specials schools increased as well as the student population attending a special school. In 1965, 266 special schools were available, and 22,850 students attended these schools. During the next ten years, which was during the Cultural Revolution, education was a standstill and only three more schools were established. At this time, these schools were restricted to those with hearing and visual impairments, but with the influence of communism, things started to change in these special schools and the idea of special education.

The new focus of special education was to align it with the national educational goal and that was to nurture individuals to succeed as laborers and socialists. Medicine was taking a leap with a new perspective about remedial education and deficit compensation and focused on the rehabilitation of students' psychological and physiological deficits. With all the new changes, in 1979 China began to recognize that intellectually disabled children should attend these special schools. In 1987, a national survey was done and acknowledged that about 51 million people as well as 8.17 million school aged children had disabilities. China had expanded the ideas of what disabilities need special schooling and resulted in six categories: hearing and speech impaired, visual impairments, physical disabilities, intellectual disabilities, psychiatric disabilities, and multiple disabilities.

In the later part of the 80s, Deng Xiaoping led the nation and demanded that the focus be economic development. The result of this growth of economics was more resources for education and in return, the education serves the community. Science and technology were how the education system was driven to success. The reform suggested that greater autonomy needed to be present within the schools and that implementation of compulsory education was a must for all children. Provisions for special education were a main part of the reform. The speed of placing students who had been denied in the past into schools had increased. There were so many children needing education and they found out how to get it to them effectively.

Goals like equal opportunities and excellence for all was the focus post-Mao-China. In 1982, new laws mandated education and social support for those with special educational needs. In 1986, The Compulsory Education Law of the People's Republic of China was passed by the National People's Congress. This supported the idea that states had to establish special schools or classes for those that had disabilities in hearing, vision, or intellect. This law started the foundation for special education in China.

Since the 80s, China has included children with disabilities in to the general education classrooms within the districts that they reside. This idea is termed, sui ban jiu du and this simply means "learning in a regular classroom". The students needing special education services are placed in general education classrooms for more reasons than one. It helped to resolve the issues of low enrollment rates of children with disabilities and the lack of special education teachers. It has become very successful and effective education approach in China.

== See also ==
- Inclusion
- Inclusive classroom
- Special Assistance Program (Australian education)
- Least Restrictive Environment
- Resource room
- Language deprivation in deaf and hard of hearing children
