= Emotional or behavioral disability =

Disability affecting recognition and control of emotions

An emotional or behavioral disability is a disability that impacts a person's ability to effectively recognize, interpret, control, and express fundamental emotions. The Individuals with Disabilities Education Act of 2004 characterizes the group of disabilities as Emotional Disturbance (ED). This term is controversial, as it is seen by some as excluding – or even discriminating against – students with behavioral issues and focusing solely on emotional aspects.

== Characteristics ==
This group of disabilities are particularly difficult to classify as generalizations occur that may lead to some students who do not fit specific diagnostic criteria, but are still disabled, not determined eligible for special education services. Broadly, the group can be broken down to internal behaviors, external behaviors and low incidence behaviors. Internal behaviors are observed in students who are depressed, withdrawn and anxious. External behaviors are seen in students who are aggressive and act out. Such behavior would be classified as Disruptive Behavioral Disorder (DBD). Low incidence behaviors are behaviors that occur only in particular environmental triggers, such as a specific person or phrase. Some students may have only one category and some have mixed categories.

== Services ==
Students with an ED often have an early diagnosis among school districts. This is because teachers initiate the referral process among concerns over behavior in class. Often, the DSM-IV is used by a school psychologist, whom may conduct interviews and distribute surveys as part of the social-emotional evaluation.

When determined ED the student will receive an Individualized Education Plan. Students can also receive certain supports under the Rehabilitation Act of 1973, referred to as a 504 plan. This often includes goals towards appropriate behavior, productive coping strategies and academic skills. Effective services should focus on these, and can mandate an educational assistant for support in regular education classes, access to a resource room for individualized instruction, medication management provided by a mental health professional, as well as individual counseling. Students with ED are often considered at-risk for dropping out of school, suicide and criminal activity, as well as also being diagnosed with a learning disability. Nonetheless, with the appropriate supports in place, students with ED have been shown to have enormous potential to succeed.

== See also ==
- Bipolar disorder
- Learning disability
- Resource room
- Special education
