= Zero reject =

Educational philosophy

Zero reject is an educational philosophy which says that no child can be denied an education because they are "uneducable". In the United States, it is a principle underlying the Individuals with Disabilities Education Act (IDEA), which requires free and public education for children with disabilities.

Research on inclusive education has found differing findings related to student outcomes, with some evidence for modest benefits for students with general learning difficulties, and other evidence showing no statistically significant average difference between inclusive and segregated settings.

Malaysia recently implemented a Zero Reject Policy in 2019 to guarantee access to public schools to individuals with special education needs. Reviews and studies of its implementation have raise concerns about the policy's scope, school resources, training, and feasibility.

== Background ==
The origin of zero reject policy and IDEA can be traced back to the Education of All Handicapped Children Act passed by the U.S. Congress in 1975. IDEA replaced this law in 1990, which also underwent a succession of amendments starting in 1997. The law aims to facilitate the movement of qualified individuals with disabilities from their home and school into mainstream employment.

One of the core principles of IDEA is zero reject: no child with a disability can be denied a Free Appropriate Public Education (FAPE). Under IDEA, states receiving assistance ensure that FAPE is provided to all eligible children with disabilities from ages 3 to 21, inclusive. Limited exceptions are stated for children ages 3 to 5 and 18 to 21, where FAPE mandates would interfere with state law or court orders.

FAPE also applies to students with disabilities who have been suspended or expelled from school. Additionally, judicial interpretation of zero reject has led to the ruling that students who committed behavioral offenses due to their disabilities cannot be suspended or expelled.

Regardless of the severity of their disabilities, IDEA also mandates that states identify, locate, and evaluate children with disabilities who are in need of special education or other related services. This policy is known as Child Find.

Under IDEA, the main method of special education used to provide FAPE is called an Individualized Education Program (IEP). IEPs are made on a student-by-student basis and are individually tailored to each students severity of disability, level of functioning, and the impact of the student's disability on their involvement in general curriculums.

IDEA also commits to providing states and educators with support and tools for improving the educational quality of students with disabilities, and to assess these efforts.

== Outcomes ==
A 2022 systematic review examined 15 studies investigating whether inclusive education environments had an effect on academic achievement, socioemotional development, and well-being of students with special educational needs, compared to segregated education environments. Its sample included students with Down syndrome, learning and intellectual disabilities, autism, ADHD, physical disabilities, and visual impairments. The review found no statistically significant pooled effects and no consistent average benefit or harm associated with the inclusion of children with special educational needs. Importantly, this systematic review only examined outcomes for the students with special educational needs, not their classmates. The data were primarily correlational, and causation could not be established.

A 2021 meta-analysis included 40 studies comparing inclusive and segregated classrooms on cognitive and psychosocial outcomes. This meta-analysis looked at outcomes for both students with general learning difficulties and for their classmates. Inclusive settings were associated with modestly better cognitive outcomes for children with general learning difficulties, though this was not a large effect. No statistically significant cognitive outcomes were found for classmates without general learning disabilities. No statistically significant psychosocial effects were found for children children with general learning difficulties or their peers. Again, the data in this meta-analysis were primarily correlational.

Overall, research findings are mixed as to the effects of inclusive education for student outcomes, with some studies finding modestly positive cognitive effects. Findings do not show a statistically significant negative effect on classmates, but it cannot be established that inclusion has no effects due to lack of experimental data in the underlying studies.

== Zero Reject in Malaysia ==
In 2019, the Ministry of Education Malaysia implemented a Zero Reject Policy (ZRP) for students with Special Education Needs (SEN). ZRP in Malaysia originated from an ongoing movement for education for all, and the policy mandated that students with disabilities must not be denied access to public schools. This section details some of the perspectives and critiques of this policy.

A 2020 policy review examined whether ZRP in Malaysia represented genuine progress toward inclusive education. The review called for research on how ZRP is enacted at different levels of implementation (ministry policy, school administration, teacher practice, classroom support, everyday interactions). The author also suggested that future educational policy in Malaysia should include students with disabilities beyond those covered in existing SEN categories, broadening the coverage of the policy.

A critique review in 2020 argued that ZRP is a necessary policy for to guarantee access to education, but is not sufficient on its own. It claims that successful implementation requires teacher knowledge, readiness, workload management, and school support—not just a policy. Overall, the review provides a critical lens and questions the feasibility of implementing zero reject due to the following issues: teacher capacity, readiness and acceptance, workload, learning conditions, student behavior, and policy ambiguity.

Some studies have investigated various aspects of implementation of ZRP in Malaysia. For example, a 2023 study examined understanding of and readiness to implement ZRP for six headmasters in Selangor. This qualitative phenomenological study found that headmasters generally understood the main goals of ZRP, but felt inadequately prepared to properly implement it. The main barriers they reported included lack of infrastructure, limited special education knowledge, and lack of leadership preparation. Headmasters also reported worrying about schools becoming overcrowded and strains on resources. Overall, headmasters were not opposed to the policy, but saw a gap between its mandates and their schools' ability to respond.

Additionally, a 2023 study examined teachers' adaptive teaching skills in the context of ZRP. It was a mixed-methods study of primary school teachers in rural Sarawak, with 230 teachers completing the quantitative component and 13 teachers participating in the qualitative component. Although the quantitative data indicated high adaptive teaching qualities on average, qualitative data revealed that the majority of teachers viewed their adaptive teaching qualities as moderate. Most of the teachers in the qualitative component reported that their adaptive teaching qualities were limited by their lack of exposure and training in teaching SEN students.

Overall, recent research on Malaysia's Zero Reject Policy indicates support for its principles and goals. However, there are doubts about the scope of the mandate, as well as whether schools in Malaysia can sufficiently enact it without additional training and resources.
