= Rwenzori Peace Bridge for Reconciliation =

Rwenzori Peace Bridge for Reconciliation is one of the non profit organizations of Uganda. It is also a non-partisan and non governmental organization. It is commonly abbreviated as RPBR. It is a local community peace initiative that was founded during the insurgencies with the Allied Democratic Forces in the Rwenzori region. It mainly works in Kasese district and Its offices are located in Kasese district in the Western part of Uganda. This organization was founded in 1998. It is a membership based organization composed of a network of grassroots community organizations and peace clubs in schools. It is also registered under the NGO board of Uganda under the number 3740.

The major aim of this organization is to promote peaceful means of conflict resolution and reconciliation considering the value of human rights too.

The core programs of the organizations are:

- Peace training, conflict resolution and Management
- Youth work and Functional Adult Literacy Education
- Resource center(RPBR Peace and Literacy Library)
- Human Rights and Social Justice
