= Interim alternative educational setting =

Type of educational placement

An interim alternative educational setting (IAES) is an educational setting and program other than the student's current placement that enables the student to continue to receive educational services according to their Individualized Education Program. The Individualized Education Program or IEP is a plan determined by a team who develops a set of modifications for the educational program of a special education student. The setting is designed to allow the student to continue progress in the regular curriculum to meet the goals set out by the IEP and to allow students to receive services and modifications designed to help them address problem behavior.

== Research articles ==
- Alternative Educational Settings, School District Implementation of IDEA 1997 Requirements by Cathy F. Telzrow
