= IDEA 2004 =

Individuals with Disabilities Education Improvement Act of 2004
- Other short titles: IDEA 2004
- Long title: An Act To reauthorize the Individuals with Disabilities Education Act, and for other purposes.
- Enacted by: the 108th United States Congress
- Effective: July 1, 2005 and others

Citations
- Public law: Pub. L. 108–446 (text) (PDF)
- Statutes at Large: 118 Stat. 2647

Legislative history
- Introduced in the House as H.R. 1350 by Mike Castle on March 19, 2003; Committee consideration by House Education and Workforce; Passed the House on April 30, 2003 (251–171, in lieu of S. 1248); Passed the Senate on May 13, 2004 (95–3); Reported by the joint conference committee on November 17, 2004; agreed to by the House on November 19, 2004 (397–3) and by the Senate on November 19, 2004 (Unanimous Consent); Signed into law by President George W. Bush on December 3, 2004

The Individuals with Disabilities Education Improvement Act of 2004 (IDEA 2004) is a United States law that mandates equity, accountability, and excellence in education for children with disabilities. As of 2018, approximately seven million students enrolled in U.S. schools receive special education services due to a disability.

Signed into law by President George W. Bush on December 3, 2004. It became effective July 1, 2005 with the exception of elements relating to the "highly qualified teacher". It authorizes formula grants to states, as well as discretionary grants for research, technology, and training. The latest revision of IDEA became effective in October 2006.

== IDEA 1997 vs. IDEA 2004 ==
Since being signed into law, the Education for All Handicapped Children Act (EHA) of 1975 has undergone several revisions. It was initially created to assure all children were receiving a free and appropriate public education (FAPE). Updates are made approximately every five years. Changes were authorized in 2004 under the new name of Individuals with Disabilities Education Improvement Act (IDEA). In 2006, additional changes were made to IDEA as final regulations were released. They required schools to use research based interventions in the process of assisting students with learning difficulties, or determining eligibility for special education. Many schools have implemented Response to Intervention (RTI) as a method of meeting the new requirements set by IDEA 2004.

== Changes to the IEP (Individualized Education Plan) Process ==
1. Content of the IEP -These encompasses annual goals, short term objectives, educational progress, special education and related services, accommodations and alternative assessments, and transitions.
2. IEP meeting attendance - A member of the IEP team may be excused if the team member's service will not be discussed at the meeting. This must be approved by the school and the parents.
3. IEPs by agreement
4. Review and revision of IEPs
5. Transition - Clarifies that transition services should begin at age 16, and should include a list of interagency responsibilities with needed resources
6. Alternate means of participating in meetings.

== Changes to Due Process ==
Changes to due process include the following: Procedural Safeguards Notice only needs to be distributed once per year, Parents have two years to exercise due process rights, changes to the due process complaint notice procedure, parents must go through a mandatory resolution session before due process, responsibility for attorney's fees and requirements for hearing officers.

== Changes to Student Discipline ==
1. Adds new authority for school staff to determine discipline on a case by case basis

2. New standards for manifestation determinations where the burden of proof has been shifted to the parents and must prove that the behavior was "caused by or had direct and substantial relationship to the child's disability", or was a "direct result of the LEA's failure to implement the IEP."

3. Adds a new standard for special circumstances (Drugs, Weapons, Serious Bodily Harm)

== Resources ==
- IDEA Partnership (Outside Source): The IDEA Partnership reflects the collaborative work of more than 50 national organizations, technical assistance providers, and organizations and agencies at state and local level. Together with the OSEP, the Partner Organizations form a community with the potential to transform the way we work and improve outcomes for students and youth with disabilities. Dedicated to improving outcomes for students and youth with disabilities through shared work and learning.
- Conference Report on HR 1350, "Individuals with Disabilities Education Improvement Act of 2004" (Outside Source)
- Individuals with Disabilities Education Act (IDEA): Analysis of Changes Made by P.L. 108-446, Congressional Research Service Analysis of New IDEA Law -January 5, 2005 (PDF, Outside Source): This report detail the changes made by P.L. 108-446 covering all parts of IDEA but concentrates on Part B, which authorizes grants for children with disabilities ages three to twenty-one and contains key provisions regarding the structure of special education and related services and the procedural safeguards that guarantee the provision of a free appropriate public education (FAPE) to children with disabilities.
- National Association of State Directors of Special Education (NASDSE) (Outside Source): NASDSE offers a 200-page side-by-side that compares current law to the amended law signed by President Bush on December 3. Individual copies are $15 each; bulk orders of 100 copies or more receive a 15% discount. To order your copy, send a check or purchase order to NASDSE, 1800 Diagonal Road., Suite 320, Alexandria, VA 22314, Attention: C. Burgman. The document is not available in electronic format.
- Council on Exceptional Children (CEC) (Outside Source): Latest information on the reauthorization of the IDEA 2004 including summary and analysis of the new IDEA, press releases on the bill, and a link to the bill itself.
- Highly Qualified Teachers Improving Teacher Quality, State Grants, ESEA Title II, Part A Non-Regulatory Guidance, August 3, 2005 (Outside Source): This Guidance also includes questions on highly qualified teacher flexibility policies, revisions to and expansions of answers to several questions, revisions to the deadline by which paraprofessionals must become highly qualified, and new information on highly qualified special education teachers that results from the reauthorization of the IDEA. This Guidance is under revision and will be released in the near future by the ED.

== See also ==
- Response to intervention
