= Least restrictive environment =

American special education term

In the United States, the Individuals with Disabilities Education Act (IDEA) is a special education law that mandates regulation for students with disabilities to protect their rights as students and the rights of their parents. The IDEA requires that all students receive a Free and Appropriate Public Education (FAPE), and that these students should be educated in the least restrictive environment (LRE). To determine what an appropriate setting is for a student, an Individualized Education Plan (IEP) team will review the student's strengths, weaknesses, and needs, and consider the educational benefits from placement in any particular educational setting. By law the team is required to include the student's parent or guardian, a general education teacher, a special education teacher, a representative of the local education agency, someone to interpret evaluation results and, if appropriate, the student. It is the IEP team's responsibility to determine what environment is the LRE for any given student with disabilities, which varies between every student. The goal of an IEP is to create the LRE for that student to learn in. For some students, mainstream inclusion in a standard classroom may be an appropriate setting whereas other students may need to be in a special education classroom full time, but many students fall somewhere within this spectrum. Students may also require supplementary aids and services (such as an interpreter, resource room or itinerant teacher) to achieve educational goals while being placed in a classroom with students without disabilities, these resources are provided as needed. The LRE for a student is less of a physical location, and more of a concept to ensure that the student is receiving the services that they need to be successful.

If the nature or severity of their disability prevents the student from achieving these goals in a standard classroom, the student would be withdrawn from the standard classroom and be placed in an alternate environment that is more suitable for the student. Schools and public agencies are required to have a continuum of alternative placements for students with disabilities. These alternative placements include separate classes, specialized schools, and homebound instruction (not to be confused with homeschooling). This is to ensure that schools are capable of meeting the needs of all students with disabilities. This continuum of placements is not always full inclusion or complete separate schooling, but can be a mix of both standard classes and alternative placements.

Four of the most common types of LRE are general education classroom with support, partial mainstream/inclusion classroom, special education classroom, specialized program outside of the school district. In a general education classroom with support the student is in a general education classroom all day, with added services like an aid, assistive technology, or accommodations/modifications to the curriculum. In a partial mainstream/inclusion classroom the student spends part of the day in the general classroom and part of the day in a special education classroom. In a special education classroom the student spends the day in a specialized classroom with students with similar needs. In a specialized program outside of school district the student could attend a private school, specialized program, or residential program.

== Court rulings ==
Because the law does not clearly state to what degree the least restrictive environment is, courts have had to interpret the LRE principle. In a landmark case interpreting IDEA's predecessor statute (EHA), Daniel R.R. v. State Board of Education (1989), it was determined that students with disabilities have a right to be included in both academic and extracurricular programs of general education. But, the court stated, IDEA does not contemplate an all-or-nothing educational system in which students with disabilities attend either standard or special education. Rather, the act and its regulations require schools to offer a continuum of services. Thus, the school must take intermediate steps where appropriate, such as placing the student in standard education for some academic classes and in special education for others, mainstreaming the student for nonacademic classes only, or providing interaction with non-disabled students during lunch and recess. The appropriate mix will vary from student to student and, it may be hoped, from school year to school year as the student develops. If the school officials have provided the maximum appropriate exposure to non-disabled students, they have fulfilled their obligation under IDEA.

In Board of Education, Sacramento City Unified School District v. Rachel H., 14 F.3d 1398 (9th Cir. 1994), the court identified four factors that need to be taken into consideration when determining if the student's LRE is appropriate:

- the educational benefits of integrated settings versus segregated settings
- non-academic benefits (primarily social interaction with non-disabled peers)
- the effect the student with a disability can have on the teacher and their peers
- the cost of supplementary services that will be required for that student to stay in the integrated setting

In other words, the student should receive an appropriate version of the educational and social benefits which non-disabled students routinely receive in school. In broad theory, the court does not allow the education of the student's non-disabled peers to be negatively affected, although applying this test fairly to all the facts and circumstances of a specific situation may be very difficult. The final factor, cost of supplementary services, provides a safeguard for schools so that they do not exceed spending on one particular student.

== Specific examples ==
IDEA protects students whose disabilities fall within 13 categories:

- Autism
- Deaf-blindness
- Deafness
- Emotional disturbance
- Hearing impairments
- Intellectual disabilities
- Multiple disabilities
- Orthopedic impairments
- Other health impairments
- Specific learning disabilities
- Speech or language impairments
- Traumatic brain injury
- Visual impairments including blindness

Some of these labels are decided through a rigorous referral process through the school district and others are given based on diagnosis by a medical doctor, psychiatrist, or psychologist. Specific examples of applications of the LRE principle for are discussed below.

=== Autism ===
According to IDEA, an individual with autism is someone with "a developmental disability significantly affecting verbal and nonverbal communication and social interaction, generally evident before age three, that adversely affects a child's educational performance." IDEA states that an individual who fits these characteristics can receive special education services if a student is exhibiting signs of autism after their third birthday. Characteristics associated with autism spectrum disorder, or ASD, fall within three categories: social interaction, behavior, and communication. Common symptoms include unusual fixations, specific routines, disruptive behavior, unusual communication habits, and difficulty understanding social interactions.

In fall 2015, 39.7% of students ages 6–21 who had been diagnosed with autism spent 80% or more of their time in a general classroom. This is compared to 63.9% of students with a developmental delay or 47% with emotional disturbance.

=== Deaf-blindness ===
According to IDEA, deaf-blindness is defined as "concomitant [simultaneous] hearing and visual impairments, the combination of which causes such severe communication and other developmental and educational needs that they cannot be accommodated in special education programs solely for children with deafness or children with blindness."

=== Deafness ===
The least restrictive environment clause states that students should be able to be educated in an environment with "non-disabled peers". However, in the case of deaf students, there are many cases where a mainstream classroom may not be the most inclusive, or least restrictive, environment.

Some accommodations can be made to make a mainstream school more appropriate for a deaf student, such as interpreters, a deaf program within a mainstream school with deaf peers and language models present, or CART services. However, these are not always successful for every deaf student. Deaf residential and day schools provide certain benefits that the typical LRE would not hold, such as placing deaf students into classrooms with kids their own age and amount of hearing loss, and with staff that are certified to work the deaf, to facilitate social interaction. Deaf schools also may have specialized education equipment and extracurricular activities that are made communicably accessible to the deaf to help promote growth emotionally and cognitively.

Studies that have shown that the typical inclusion model for the deaf has some benefits. One study found that a classroom with both hearing and deaf and hard of hearing students actually helped improved signing development for the deaf. It also showed improvement in certain testing scores such as reading vocabulary/comprehension and solving math problems. Additionally, within the IDEA there is a subsection describing alternative appropriate school placements. Within this section special schools are included.

The NAD (National Association of the Deaf) believes that the least restrictive environment for the deaf is an environment that promotes a student's social, cognitive and emotional development with the least amount of communication and language barriers. The NAD supports placement of deaf and hard of hearing students in the standard education setting if the placement decision made was based on a thorough evaluation of the student and their needs. They believe that the placement and resources provided for the student should be based on communication and that the IEP team making the decision should be fully educated on the issues related to sign language and the needs of the deaf population.

=== Hearing impairments ===
According to IDEA, a hearing impairment is "an impairment in hearing, whether permanent or fluctuating, that adversely affects a child's educational performance but is not included under the definition of 'deafness'."

=== Intellectual disabilities ===
According to IDEA, an intellectual disability is defined as "significantly sub-average general intellectual functioning, existing concurrently [at the same time] with deficits in adaptive behavior and manifested during the developmental period, that adversely affects a child's educational performance."

=== Multiple disabilities ===
According to IDEA, multiple disabilities is defined as a "concomitant [simultaneous] impairments (such as intellectual disability-blindness, intellectual disability-orthopedic impairment, etc.), the combination of which causes such severe educational needs that they cannot be accommodated in a special education program solely for one of the impairments. The term does not include deaf-blindness."

=== Orthopedic impairments ===
According to IDEA, an orthopedic impairment is defined as "a severe orthopedic impairment that adversely affects a child's educational performance" this term includes "impairments caused by a congenital anomaly [birth defects], impairments caused by disease (e.g., poliomyelitis, bone tuberculosis), and impairments from other causes (e.g., cerebral palsy, amputations, and fractures or burns that cause contractures)."

=== Other health impairments ===
According to IDEA, other health impairments are defined as "having limited strength, vitality, or alertness, including a heightened alertness to environmental stimuli, that results in limited alertness with respect to the educational environment, that— (a) is due to chronic or acute health problems such as asthma, attention deficit disorder or attention deficit hyperactivity disorder, diabetes, epilepsy, a heart condition, hemophilia, lead poisoning, leukemia, nephritis [a kidney disorder], rheumatic fever, sickle cell anemia, and Tourette syndrome; and (b) adversely affects a child's educational performance."

=== Specific learning disabilities ===
According to IDEA, a specific learning disability (SLD) makes up the largest portion of students receiving services. The majority of students receiving services for specific learning disabilities are in mainstream classrooms.

Common learning disabilities include dyslexia, dyscalculia, dysgraphia, auditory and visual processing disorders, and nonverbal learning disabilities. Early intervention is valuable for all disability categories but given the high frequency of students with learning disabilities, it is even more valuable. 80% of students with a learning disability have trouble reading. Ninety percent of students will read normally if they receive help by the first grade. Seventy-five percent of students who receive help after the age of nine will have some difficulty throughout life.

Accommodations and modifications for students with learning disabilities vary based on the specific kind of learning disability and on the individual and unique needs of the student. Some examples of creating the least restrictive environment for students with learning disabilities include providing an audio recording of instructions or passages, providing text with a larger font, reducing the word count per line of text, and having a designated reader to give the written directions aloud to the student. More examples include allowing verbal responses, having a scribe, using voice recording for responses, etc. Some students may need extended periods for exams, separate testing locations, having the notes in advance, notes only on paper in black and white, etc. Each specific learning disability is different, and each student has unique needs.

=== Speech or language impairments ===
IDEA defines a speech or language impairment as "a communication disorder, such as stuttering, impaired articulation, language impairment, or a voice impairment, that adversely affects a student's educational performance". School speech-language pathologists (SLP) must work with school evaluation teams to identify students who meet certain criteria prior to beginning services.

School speech-language pathologists (SLP) must work with school evaluation teams to identify students who meet certain criteria prior to beginning services.The range and severity of students that meet such criteria has greatly expanded in recent years. In determining the least restrictive environment for a student with a speech or language impairment, it is important to consider the severity of their condition. While students with more severe impairments will benefit more from individualized services, IDEA regulates that students receiving speech-language services should be educated with their peers as much as possible. This often consists of the SLP working in the general classroom with the student and the help of the general education teacher. It needs to be ensured by the SLP that the student is simultaneously meeting individualized needs while in the general classroom. As mentioned previously, students with more severe impairments may still benefit more from individualized services outside of the general classroom. Small group meetings with an SLP outside of the general classroom can also be beneficial for those with similar impairments or needs. Regardless of the environment, a student's IEP must always be addressed while working toward progress in the general curriculum.

=== Traumatic brain injury ===
According to IDEA, traumatic brain injuries are defined as "an acquired injury to the brain caused by an external physical force, resulting in total or partial functional disability or psychosocial impairment, or both, that adversely affects a child's educational performance."

=== Visual impairments including blindness ===
According to IDEA, visual impairments including blindness are defined as "an impairment in vision that, even with correction, adversely affects a child's educational performance. The term includes both partial sight and blindness."

== Least restrictive environment in physical education ==
The Individuals with Disabilities Education Act (IDEA) describes physical education as a critical component for all individuals ages three to twenty-one. Students with disabilities must be placed in the Least Restrictive Environment (LRE) in order to receive appropriate education based on the IDEA at no cost to either the parents or students. Students with disabilities based on IDEA, must be placed with students in the general education setting as much as possible, in order to ensure the students living with disability are receiving the same education as their non-disabled peers. Alternative student placement is contingent upon the necessities of the student based on their IEP's and the requirements of the physical activity. Alternative placements must ensure that the student is being given the same enrichments as those who are not being placed elsewhere.

== See also ==
- Inclusion
- Inclusive classroom
- Resource room
- Special education in the United States
- Mainstreaming in education
