= Resource room =

Support area in special education

A resource room is a type of support for students with disabilities in need of special education that allows them to leave their general education classroom placement and go to another location for targeted instructional support. It is one of many support options for special education students around the world to help meet their needs and serves as a transition stage between a self-contained classroom and a general education classroom for special education students. In the resource room, students work with a special education teacher or aide in either a small group or individual instruction.

Individual needs may be addressed in resource rooms as indicated in a student's Individualized Education Plan (IEP). Special education instructors in a resource room focus on particular goals as mandated by an IEP and remedial general education curriculum. Some programs emphasize the development of executive skills, including homework completion and behavior.

== Rationale ==
Depending on individual needs, students usually attend resource rooms three to five times per week for about forty-five minutes per day. Some research has suggested these classrooms are of particular benefit to students with language-based learning disabilities such as dyslexia. Other research has indicated that students show growth in visuo-motor perception, arithmetic, spelling and overall self-perception through time in the resource room classroom. At least one study has suggested students with learning disabilities in resource rooms have higher expectations regarding their academic success when they are in the class. This may be due to the familiarity with the resource room teacher, small group direct instruction or confidence within an area they are comfortable in. Researchers believe that explicit instruction that breaks tasks down into smaller segments is an important tool for learning for students with learning disabilities. Students often benefit from "reteaching" of core concepts taught initially in general education classroom and reinforced in resource rooms via the small-group instructional model, which has been shown to lead to achievement in students with a multitude of educational disabilities.

In multiple studies, research showed that special education students prefer resource rooms as opposed to having a special education teacher in their general education classroom setting. Students thought the work in resource rooms was easier and more fun, their resource room classmates were more friendly, and their resource room teacher was more supportive. In these studies, general education students were also surveyed about which method they prefer, and a majority answered resource rooms as well.

== Resource rooms in various countries ==
In Turkey, resource rooms, also called pull-out programmes, are used as an option for special education students who are in integrated classrooms. Students in resource rooms either work individually with the teacher or in small groups of students, and focus on reading, writing, and mathematics. These sessions can occur anywhere in the school and do not require a specific classroom or space, such as the library or a teacher's lounge.

In China, resource rooms were created to support inclusion classrooms in the 1980s. Their purpose was to aid special education teachers in managing their students' evaluations, behaviors, academics, and more. China implemented the Guidelines for the Construction of Special Education Resource Rooms for Regular Education Schools in 2016 that required resource rooms and a resource room teacher if schools had at least five students with special education needs.

In Jordan, a student is placed into a resource room if they are a special education student in a general education classroom, and if their teachers, parents, and principal approve of the placement. Only students in second through sixth grade can be placed in a resource room. The resource room is made up of either a small group of four to six students, or one student who learns one-on-one with the teacher.

In the United States, the Individuals with Disabilities Education Act (IDEA) protects students with disabilities by requiring placement in their least restrictive environment (LRE). The LRE varies depending on the student and falls on a spectrum beginning with a general education classroom and becoming more restrictive in a resource room, special education classroom, separate special education school, or a private placement. Special education students in the United States can only be placed in a resource room if it is considered their LRE because their needs can only be partially met in a general education setting. The full inclusion movement in the United States sometimes comes into conflict with the requirements of IDEA by aiming to place special education students into general education classrooms 100% of the time. Less ideological inclusionists recognize that resource rooms can help support students with disabilities who may languish in general education settings without sufficient assistance.

== See also ==
- Special school
- Mainstreaming in education
- Inclusion (education)
- Special education
- Individualized Education Plan
- Learning disability
- Direct instruction
