= General Studies =

School subject spanning multiple disciplines

General Studies or general education is a multidisciplinary subject offered at different levels of education. Its scope varies by country.

== North America ==
Some North American universities offer the Bachelor of General Studies degree.

== England, Wales and Northern Ireland ==
General Studies is a GCSE and former A-level examination offered to 16- to 18-year-olds in England, Wales and Northern Ireland. It overlaps with PSHE and citizenship.

The GCSE syllabus covered arts and culture, politics and the economy, society and ethics, science and technology, and the relationships between these topics.

The A-Level syllabus was introduced in the 1950s, and intended to "broaden minds by encouraging students to develop their thinking skills, capacity to construct arguments and ability to draw conclusions", according to the AQA examination board. The syllabus covered "Culture and Society" (including culture, religion, philosophy, politics and the media); and "Science and Society" (including scientific research, technology and mathematics). It was withdrawn as an A-Level subject from 2017, with final examination in 2020.

== Hong Kong ==
General studies is a knowledge-oriented school subject taught in primary schools of Hong Kong. The Government of Hong Kong states that "General Studies provides students with opportunities to integrate knowledge, skills, values and attitudes across the Key Learning Areas (KLAs) of Personal, Social and Humanities Education (PSHE uk), Science Education (SE) and Technology Education (TE)."

== Malaysia ==
In Malaysia, general studies is part of the STPM examination, which is better known as its Malay name, Pengajian Am.

== See also ==
- Boston University College of General Studies
- Columbia University School of General Studies, a liberal arts college at Columbia University
- Liberal arts
- Creative arts
