= Free Appropriate Public Education =

US disabled children's educational right

The right to a Free Appropriate Public Education (FAPE) is an educational entitlement of all students in the United States who are identified as having a disability, guaranteed by the Rehabilitation Act of 1973 and the Individuals with Disabilities Education Act (IDEA).

FAPE is a civil right rooted in the Fourteenth Amendment, which requires schools to provide students with disabilities special education and related services, at public expense, designed to prepare those students for the future. The right to FAPE was developed via various statutes as well as case law, and its implementation has evolved over the years. FAPE is offered to students through the Individualized Education Program (IEP) and/or 504 process.

== Basics ==
FAPE is a civil right rooted in the Fourteenth Amendment of the United States Constitution, which includes the Equal Protection and Due Process clauses.

FAPE is defined in the Code of Federal Regulations (7 CFR 15b.22) as "the provision of regular or special education and related aids and services that (i) are designed to meet individual needs of handicapped persons as adequately as the needs of nonhandicapped persons are met and (ii) are based on adherence to procedures that satisfy the requirements" specified for one's educational setting with regard to one's evaluation, placement, and procedural safeguards. In the U.S. Code, FAPE is defined as an educational program and related services that are individualized to a specific student and meet the standards established by the state, provided at public expense and without charge.

To provide FAPE to a student, schools must provide students with an education, including specialized instruction and related services where necessary, designed to prepare the child for "further education, employment, and independent living."

== History ==
=== Underpinnings ===
Various laws began to carve out space for a student's right to FAPE in the mid-to-late twentieth century. For example, the 1958 Captioned Films Act, Public Law 85-905, was intended, at least in part, to enrich the educational experience of the deaf, demonstrating recognition that their educational opportunities differed somewhat from their hearing peers. Further, the Training of Professional Personnel Act of 1959, Public Law 86-158, increased the types and amount of training individuals received in learning how to educate students deemed "mentally retarded". In addition, the Elementary and Secondary Education Act, Public Law 89–10, as originally enacted in 1965 and amended that same year via Public Law 89-313, gave states grant assistance for educating students with disabilities.

Case law in the lower federal courts, i.e., at the district court level, began to move in a similar direction. In the 1972 case Pennsylvania Association for Retarded Children (PARC) v. Commonwealth of Pennsylvania, the court decided that a state could not deny, delay, or end any intellectually disabled student's access to a public education. The decision was reached after the Pennsylvania Board of Education, thirteen school districts, and the state's secretaries of education and public welfare sued the Commonwealth of Pennsylvania. The opinion asserted that education should be viewed as a continuous process, focused not only on academics, but also on teaching students how to manage their surroundings.

Similarly, in Mills v. Board of Education of District of Columbia, a case decided the same year, a group of students labeled "mentally retarded, emotionally disturbed or hyperactive" by D.C. public schools filed a civil action suit against them after being denied admission without due process under Equal Protection Clause of the Fourteenth Amendment. The court condemned the school's decision and declared that all children in D.C., regardless of any physical, mental, or emotional disabilities, are entitled to a free and appropriate public education.

=== Section 504 of the Rehabilitation Act of 1973 ===
The Rehabilitation Act of 1973 established non-discrimination requirements for federal agencies as well as state and local programs receiving federal assistance. The Act does not directly bar discrimination by individuals (as does the Americans with Disabilities Act, infra) but focuses its efforts on discrimination by the state and local recipients of federal assistance. Section 504 states that "[n]o otherwise qualified individual with a disability in the United States . . . shall, solely by reason of her or his disability, be excluded from the participation in, be denied the benefits of, or be subjected to discrimination under any program or activity receiving Federal financial assistance or under any program or activity conducted by any Executive agency or by the United States Postal Service."

As a result, state public education programs became subject to federal non-discrimination requirements. However, Section 504 only requires that the school in question develop a "plan" (often called a "504 Plan") for the child, unlike an Individualized Education Program, or IEP, which tends to generate a more in-depth, actionable document. IEPs can include specialized instruction and related services, whereas 504 Plans offer accommodations and occasionally other beneficial services such as access to technology services and support for emotional and social challenges. Generally, more students qualify for 504 Plans than IEPs, as the qualifying factors are less stringent and do not fall under the designated guidelines of the specific state education agency.

=== Education for All Handicapped Children Act ===
In 1975 Congress passed Public Law 94-142, also known as the Education for All Handicapped Children Act, which outlined that public schools should provide all students with an education appropriate for their unique needs at public expense (i.e., FAPE).

Public Law 94-142 also included that:

- The rights of students and their parents are protected by the law, under the Equal Protection Clause of the Fourteenth Amendment.
- Students and their educational rights holders (almost always their families) are entitled to due process (including access to judicial review to determine that other parties have complied with their obligations) and notice.
- Schools are required to find students with disabilities within their jurisdiction and refer those students for services (often called "child find" obligations).
- Students are entitled to assessments to determine whether they have disabilities.
- Students with disabilities must have Individualized Education Plans, or IEPs.
- An IEP should be "reasonably calculated to enable the child to receive educational benefits," e.g., achieving passing marks and grade advancement.
- Parents have a right to participate in the creation of their student's IEP, including but not limited to being present at IEP meetings.
- Students with disabilities should receive instruction in the "least restrictive environment" (LRE), ideally along with non-disabled peers where possible.
- Congress funds up to 40% of excess costs of educating students with disabilities.

Public Law 94-142 has been amended and reauthorized several times since 1975. In 1986, it was amended to Public Law 99-457. The 1990 Amendment, Public Law 101–476, renamed the Education for All Handicapped Children Act to the Individuals with Disabilities Education Act.

=== Individuals with Disabilities Education Act (IDEA) ===
The 1997 amendments of Public Law 105-17 extended the LRE requirements to assure all students access to the general education curriculum and required that assistive technology devices and services be considered (though not necessarily included) for every IEP.

The 2004 amendment, Public Law 108–446, focused on providing transition services for individuals with disabilities moving on from their school. The amendments articulate that transition services should look into connecting the students to appropriate employment opportunities and/or community resources. It also outlined that IEPs should have both short- and long-term goals and created legal framework for student discipline. Public Law 108-446 included information on teacher credentialing, i.e., so that they may be considered "highly qualified." In providing FAPE, Public Law 108-446 also clarified that states also need to set targets for their students to meet and failure to do so brings federal sanctions, such as loss of funds.

=== Americans with Disabilities Act (ADA) ===
Title II of the Americans with Disabilities Act (ADA) prohibits discrimination on the basis of disability by state and local governmental entities, including public school districts. Title III of the ADA also prohibits discrimination against students with disabilities in private schools that are considered public accommodations.

While private schools are not required to provide FAPE to students with disabilities (as by definition a private school does not provide a public education), under the ADA they must take reasonable steps to ensure that students with disabilities have equal access to their private educational program. Many times this means changes to school rules, such as letting a student use a cell phone to access applications assisting with their disability, permitting the use of tape recorders or laptop computers in class, or allowing a student extra time to walk between classrooms. A school might also provide auxiliary aids and services such as computer-aided transcription services, assistive listening devices for auditorium-based lectures, closed captioned decoders, open and closed captioning, TDDs, and videotext displays.

A private school is not required to provide an accommodation if the school can show that providing the service would fundamentally alter their program or require significant difficulty or expense, and under some circumstances they may charge extra for additional services. For example, if a school offers after-school tutoring to all students for an additional fee, they may charge the same fees to a student with a disability desiring after-school tutoring.

=== Supreme Court decisions ===
In Board of Education of the Hendrick Hudson Central School District v. Rowley, the Supreme Court ruled that a free and appropriate public education should provide access to specialized instruction. The Court ruled, however, that the school was not obliged to provide an interpreter for a deaf student to meet the bar of FAPE. If the child is passing on to the next grade within an inclusion classroom, then FAPE is presumed to be met. In other words, the state does not need to "maximize each child's potential." This left families, advocates, and schools alike wondering: How far do the parameters of FAPE extend?

The United States Supreme Court eventually unanimously ruled on the rights of students with disabilities to FAPE in Endrew F. v. Douglas County School District. The Court held that the IDEA provides disabled students the right to more than just token progress from one year to the following year. The "merely more than de minimis" standard was rejected. The Court held that all students should have a chance to meet challenging objectives. In light of the student's circumstances, schools must offer individualized educational programming that enable "appropriate progress."

=== Department of Education policy ===
The Department of Education came out with a question and answer document of nine pages addressing the high court's ruling in Endrew. Officials offered their thoughts on how teachers, school officials, parents, and stakeholders must apply this verdict in actual scenarios. For example, according to the education department, IEPs must improve functional as well as educational performance and be reassessed if the child does not make progress in accordance with the yearly objectives or more often if the parents or school ask for a review.

== Implementation ==
In Board of Education v. Rowley the United States Supreme Court set forth a two-part inquiry for determining whether a school district has satisfied the FAPE requirement, having to do with 1) procedure and 2) educational benefit.

=== Procedural requirements ===
First, the state must have "complied with the procedures set forth in the Act." These procedures enable parents of a disabled child to examine school records, participate in meetings, and present complaints. Parents must also be given notice of any proposals to change the educational placement of a child, and they are entitled to an independent educational evaluation (IEE) in the instance that they do not agree with the full individual evaluation that has been presented regarding their child's eligibility decisions. They can initiate an impartial due process hearing for failure to comply with the Act and bring a subsequent civil action challenging an adverse determination at the hearing.

Note, however, that harmless procedural errors do not amount to a denial of FAPE. Nonetheless, "procedural inadequacies that result in the loss of educational opportunity, or seriously infringe the parents' opportunity to participate in the IEP formulation process, clearly result in the denial of FAPE."

=== Educational benefit ===
Second, the IEP that is developed must be "reasonably calculated to enable the child to receive educational benefits." However, the IDEA guarantees only a basic floor of opportunity, consisting of specialized instruction and related services that provide educational benefit to individual students. The free and appropriate public education proffered in an IEP need not be the best one that money can buy, nor one that maximizes the child's educational potential. Rather, it need only be an education that specifically meets a child's unique needs, supported by services that permit the child to benefit from the instruction.

Rowley said the IDEA "cannot be read as imposing any particular substantive educational standard upon the States." However, "merely more than de minimis" standard was rejected in Endrew, which decided that all students should have a chance to meet challenging objectives. In light of the student's circumstances, schools must offer individualized educational programming that enable "appropriate progress."

One clear benchmark is progress grade-to-grade, which some courts require and all would likely recognize as appropriately ambitious. However, in situations that are less black and white (as is often the case for students with disabilities), courts have struggled with the question of how much progress is sufficient; the standards remain vague.

=== FAPE and private school students ===
All children with disabilities are entitled to receive FAPE in the United States.

On a state level, most private school students do not receive IDEA rights.

Under IDEA, public school districts are required to assess private school students for special education eligibility and services, but public districts are not required to provide those private school students with those services.

Students attending private schools per parents’ request, do not have an entitlement to receive special education services and it must be requested per the parent.

IDEA demands that school districts provide appropriate services to children with disabilities that are enrolled in a private school. Within this requirement, state (SEA) and local (LEA) education agencies are required to assist in the process to ensure these educational needs are met.

Private school representatives and representatives of parents with a disabled child enrolled in a private school will take counsel from the LEA to plan out services required to meet the students’ educational goals.

== See also ==
- Special education
- Special education in the United States
- Learning disability
- Least restrictive environment
- Individuals with Disabilities Education Act
- Response to intervention
