= Individualized Education Program =

Legal document for special education

An Individualized Education Program (IEP) is a legal document under United States law that is developed for each public school child in the US who needs special education. IEPs must be reviewed every year to keep track of the child's educational progress. Similar legal documents exist in other countries.

An IEP outlines the special education experience for all eligible students with a disability. It also includes a record of specific strategies and supports in use to help students with disabilities succeed in both academic and social aspects of school life. Students ages 3–21 attending a public school are eligible, if they have been evaluated with a need such as a specific learning disability, autism, emotional disturbance, intellectual disability, orthopedic impairment, multiple disabilities, hearing impairments, deafness, visual impairment, deaf-blindness, developmental delay, speech/language impairment, or traumatic brain injury, among others. The IEP describes the current level of functioning, strengths, and needs of a student, and creates measurable goals based on this data. It provides accommodations, modifications, related services, and specialized academic instruction to ensure that every eligible child receives a "Free Appropriate Public Education" (FAPE) in the "Least Restrictive Environment" (LRE). The IEP is intended to help children reach educational goals more easily than they otherwise would. The four component goals are: conditions, learner, behavior, and criteria. In all cases, the IEP must be tailored to the individual student's needs as identified by the IEP evaluation process and must help teachers and related service providers (such as paraprofessional educators) understand the student's disability and how the disability affects the learning process.

The IEP describes how the student learns, how the student best demonstrates that learning, and what teachers and service providers will do to help the student learn more effectively. Developing an IEP requires the team to evaluate the student in all areas of disability, consider the student's ability to access the general education curriculum, consider how the disability affects the student's learning, and choose a federal placement for the student.

== Legal basis ==
In the US, the Individuals with Disabilities Education Act (IDEA) requires public schools to develop an IEP for every student with a disability who is found to meet the federal and state requirements for special education. As long as a student qualifies for special education, the IEP is mandated to be regularly maintained and updated up to the point of high school graduation or prior to the 21st or 22nd birthday. If a student in special education attends university upon graduation, they are no longer "children with disabilities" under the Individuals with Disabilities Education Improvement Act of 2004 and are instead protected under Section 504 of the Rehabilitation Act.

== Components ==
The IEP must be designed to provide the child with a Free Appropriate Public Education (FAPE). The term IEP refers to both the educational program provided to a child with a disability and to the written document that describes that educational program. The IDEA requires that an IEP be written according to the needs of each student who is eligible under the IDEA; an IEP must also meet state regulations. The following must be included:

- The student's present levels of academic achievement and functional performance (PLAAFP) are an essential component of the IEP.
- Measurable annual goals, including academic and functional goals
- How the student's progress toward meeting annual goals is to be measured and reported to the parents
- Special-education and related services, as well as supplementary aids, are to be provided to the student
- Schedule of services to be provided, including when the services are to begin and the frequency, duration, and location for the provision of services
- Program accommodations or supports provided to school personnel on behalf of the student
- Least Restrictive Environment (LRE) data, which includes calculations of the amount of time to be spent each day by the student in general-education settings compared to special-education settings. LRE requires that students with disabilities be educated with their non-disabled peers as much as possible and that schools must provide justification for any placement outside the general education classroom.
- Explanation of any time the student will not participate along with non-disabled children
- Accommodations to be provided during state and district assessments that are necessary to measuring the student's academic and functional performance

An IEP must also include other pertinent information found necessary by the team, such as a health plan or a behavior plan for some students.

=== Accommodation ===
Some of a student's educational needs may be met using class accommodations. Accommodations are typically provided by general educators within the general education environment. Accommodations do not involve modifying the material's content but rather allow students to receive information or to demonstrate what they have learned in ways that work around their impairment, thereby minimizing the likelihood of a significant disability. Furthermore, an accommodation enables a student to complete the same assignment as their peers, but with adjustments in areas such as timing, format, setting, schedule, response method, or presentation. For example, a child may complete fewer/different parts of a homework assignment or an assessment than other students. They may also write shorter papers or be given different projects and assignments in replacement of the original task.

Accommodations may also include provisions such as preferential seating, providing photocopies of teacher notes, giving oral rather than written quizzes, extended time for tests and assignments, use of a word processor or laptop, taking tests in a quiet room, prompts and reminders for focus breaks for sensory needs, and assistance with specific subject areas.

=== Modifications ===
Modifications in the curriculum can occur if a student needs to learn material that the class has moved on from, like working on exponents while the class is moving on to applying them in the order of operations. In other words, a modification changes the lesson or what the student needs to learn. Modifications involve adjusting the curriculum. They also may occur in grading rubrics, where a student with an IEP may be assessed on different standards than other students.

Modifications can be made to the program's content, such as lowering criteria for academic success, decreasing alternative state assessments, such as off-grade level assessments, or allowing the student to receive a "focused grade"—a grade that is recognized in a high school diploma, but is noted as "focused".

=== Specially designed instruction ===
Specially designed instruction affects the instructional content, method of instructional delivery, and the performance methods and criteria that are necessary to help the student make meaningful educational progress. This instruction is designed by or with an appropriately credentialed special education teacher or related service provider. Students may have better success with small-group instruction as presented in a resource room (mandated by the program and placement outlined in the IEP), particularly with language-based instruction.

For some students, teachers may need to present information through the use of manipulatives. For other students, teachers may need to select and teach only important key concepts and then alter evaluation activities and criteria to match this content change.

The IEP team determines whether a specific type of instruction is included in a student's IEP. Generally, if the methodology is an essential part of what is required to meet the individualized needs of the student, the methodology is included. For instance, if a student has a learning disability and has not learned to read using traditional methods, then another method is used. When including such an IEP recommendation, the team describes the components of the appropriate type of methodology, as opposed to naming a specific program.

=== Supplementary aids and services ===
Supplementary aids and services are determined by the IEP team and are based on the unique needs of the student/child. Some may include:

- Assistive technology
- Specialized Equipment
- Environmental accommodations like, designated seating
- Social Skills and Interaction support, for example, social stories, cooperative learning groups
- Staff support like a teacher's aide in a classroom that provides additional support for one or more specific students.

=== Related services ===
If the child needs additional services to access or benefit from special education, schools are required to provide the related services, which include speech therapy, occupational or physical therapy, interpreters, medical services (for example, a nurse to perform procedures the child needs during the day, for example, catheterization), orientation and mobility services, parent counseling and training to help parents support the implementation of their child's IEP, psychological or counseling services, recreation services, rehabilitation, social work services, and transportation. If necessary, a student is provided with specialized transportation. This can be the case if the student has a severe disability and requires a wheelchair or is identified as having an emotional problem.

== Eligibility ==
Before an IEP is written for a student with a disability, the school must first determine whether the student qualifies for special education services. To qualify, the child's disability must have an adverse effect on the child's educational progress. To determine eligibility, the school must conduct a full evaluation of the child in all areas of disability.

If the child is found to be eligible for services, the school is required to convene an IEP team and develop an appropriate educational plan for the child. The IEP should be implemented as soon as possible after the child is determined eligible. IDEA does not state specific time frames for each step, but each state determines its own laws for identifying the criteria regarding education and how it should be followed. States have added specific timelines that schools must follow for the eligibility, IEP development, and IEP implementation milestones.

Parents and guardians play a central role in the development of an IEP and are considered equal members of the IEP team. Schools are required to involve families in meetings, provide clear explanations of procedural safeguards, and ensure communication is accessible and understandable. Active family participation has been associated with more effective implementation of services and stronger educational outcomes for students.

As outlined by IDEA, students can receive free appropriate education under special education law if they fall under one of 14 categories:

1. Autism
2. Deaf-blindness
3. Deafness
4. Developmental delay (for children aged 3–9, varies by state)
5. Emotional and behavioral disorders
6. Hearing impairment
7. Intellectual disability (formerly referred to as 'mental retardation')
8. Multiple disabilities
9. Orthopedic impairment
10. Other health impairment
11. Specific learning disability
12. Speech or language impairment
13. Traumatic brain injury
14. Visual impairment, including blindness

Although teachers and school psychologists have the ability to initiate evaluations for special education service eligibility, they are unqualified to make medical diagnoses. In order to receive services through medical providers or services that are billable by insurance, disabilities such as Attention deficit hyperactivity disorder (ADHD), autism spectrum disorder (ASD), and physical and developmental delays must be diagnosed by a clinician, whether nurse practitioner or physician. When children are diagnosed early, they can start receiving services at earlier stages of development. State health and/or education departments offer early intervention services for children under the age of three years, while the public school system offers services for children from ages three through twenty-one.

== Developing the student's IEP ==
After the student is determined to be eligible for special education services, the IEP team is required to develop an IEP to be implemented as soon as possible after eligibility is determined. Using the results of the evaluation, the IEP team works together to identify the student's present level of educational performance, as well as the student's specific academic and any related or special services that the child needs in order to benefit from their education.

When developing an IEP, the team must consider the strengths of the student, the concerns of the parent for their student's education, the results of the initial or most recent evaluation of the child (including private evaluations conducted by the parents), and the academic, developmental, and functional needs of the student. The team must also consider areas of deficit. Corresponding annual goals and objectives should be created to improve these areas. In the case of a student whose behavior impedes their own learning or that of other children, the team is required to consider positive behavior intervention and support to address the behavior. A Functional Behavior Assessment (FBA) may be required by the team to address the behavioral concerns. An FBA is conducted by a child psychologist with input from the IEP team.

The IEP team is required to consider the student's communication needs. For example, if a student is blind or visually impaired, the IEP is mandated to provide instruction in braille unless an evaluation of the student's reading and writing skills, needs, and future needs indicates that this instruction is not appropriate for the student. If a student is deaf or hard of hearing, the team is required to consider the child's language and communication needs, including the need to communicate with school personnel and peers, and the student's need for direct instruction in the child's language and communication mode. In the case of a child with limited English proficiency, the team is required to consider the language needs of the child as those needs relate to the child's IEP.

A matrix is drafted containing the student's present level of performance, indicators about ways the student's disability influences participation and progress in the general curriculum, a statement of measurable goals that include benchmarks or short-term objectives, the specific educational services to be provided, which include program modifications or supports, an explanation of the extent that the child will not participate in general education, a description of all modifications in statewide or district-wide assessments, the projected date for services to begin and their expected duration, the annual statement of transition service needs (beginning at age 14), a statement of inter-agency responsibilities to ensure continuity of services when the student leaves school (by age 16), and a statement regarding how the student's progress will be measured and how the parents will be informed in the process.

== Funding ==
The school's special education program is funded by the federal government. The funding is based on the overall student attendance.

== Procedural safeguards ==
School personnel have an obligation to provide parents with a Procedural Safeguards Notice, which is required to include an explanation of all of the procedural safeguards built into IDEA. The information must be understandable and in the native language of the parent. A copy of the Procedural Safeguards Notice is required to be present at an IEP meeting. The school must give the parent a copy of the child's IEP at no cost. An extensive system of conflict resolution procedures is set out in the statutory provisions. They include the right to examine records, advance notification of intent to change the educational program, the right to engage in mediation, and the right to an impartial due process hearing.

== Ending an IEP ==
The child will stay in special education unless their parents or legal guardians request removal or if the child meets all their IEP goals and retests out. Some special education programs will slowly test the child out in general education classes. This is done to make sure the child will succeed without need of the special education program. If the child can be successful in a general classroom, then there is no more need for the child to be in special education. If the child is unable to be successful in the general education classes, the IEP participants will come back together to see why the child was not succeeding. The goal of the school is to have the child succeed in school no matter the resources needed to get them there.

== Other countries ==
=== Canada ===
Canada has similar documents called an Individualized Education Plan (IEP), a Special Education Plan (SEP), an Individualized Program Plan (IPP), a Student Support Plan (SSP), or an Individual Support Services Plan (ISSP), depending on the province or territory. The IEP system in Canada functions relatively similarly to the US, though regulations vary between provinces.

=== European Union ===
Germany and Sweden have applied Individual educational plans.

=== Kazakhstan ===
In Kazakhstan, children with special educational needs receive instruction according to Standard Educational Programs for Children with Special Educational Needs (Kazakh: ЕБҚ білім алушылара арналған үлгілік оқу бағдарламалары; Russian: Типовые учебные программы для детей с ООП), which serve as the national equivalent of Individualized Education Programs (IEPs). These programs define educational objectives and content tailored to the child's specific needs and provide adaptations based on the type of disability, including intellectual, visual, hearing, motor, or multiple disabilities. Separate versions of the curricula exist for different levels of education, including preschool, primary, and basic secondary school. Schools and educators use these programs to design individualized learning plans, monitor progress, and implement appropriate support services for each student.

=== Saudi Arabia ===
In Saudi Arabia, the document is known as an Individual Education Program. In Saudi Arabia, all schools must provide an IEP for all students who have disabilities. The process of creating an IEP in Saudi Arabia may exclude the parents and other providers of services.

=== United Kingdom ===
In the United Kingdom, the equivalent documents are called an Individual Support Plans and ECHPs (education, health and care plan) which form part of the UK's SEND system.

== See also ==
- Individualized instruction
- Section 504 of the Rehabilitation Act
- Special Assistance Program (Australian education)

== General and cited references ==
- Alquraini, Turki (November 26, 2011). "Special Education in Saudi Arabia: Challenges, Perspectives, Future Possibilities". International Journal of Special Education. 26 (2): 149–159. ISSN 0827-3383. Archived from the original on September 11, 2017 – via ERIC.
- Kamens, M. W. (November 2004). "Learning to Write IEPs: A Personalized, Reflective Approach for Preservice Teachers". Intervention in School and Clinic. 40 (2): 76–80. doi:10.1177/10534512040400020201. S2CID 145702609.
- Katsiyannis, A., & Maag, J. W. (2001). "Educational methodologies: Legal and practical considerations". Preventing School Failure, 46(1), 31–36.
- Lewis, A. C. (2005). "The Old, New IDEA". The Education Digest, 70(5), 68–70.
- Male, Dawn B. (2014). "Chapter 44: Friendships and Peer Relations Among and Between Children and Young People with and Without Learning Difficulties and/or Disabilities". In Florian, Lani (ed.). Sage Handbook of Special Education (PDF). Vol. 1 (2nd ed.). pp. 678–690. ISBN 978-1-4462-1053-6. LCCN 2013935719. Archived from the original (PDF) on 3 July 2022.
- Patterson, K. (2005). "What classroom teachers need to know about IDEA '97". Kappa Delta Pi Record, 41(2), 62–67.
- Pierangelo, Roger, & Giuliani, George (2004). Transition services in special education: A practical approach. Pearson Education. pp. 3–9. Print.
- Ormrod, Jeanne Ellis. Educational Psychology: Developing Learners (fifth edition). Pearson, Merrill Prentice Hall, 2006.
- Weishaar, M. K. (2001). "The regular educator's role in the individual education plan process". The Clearing House, 75(2), 96–98.
