= Fry v. Napoleon Community Schools =

- Supreme Court of the United States

Argued October 31, 2016 Decided February 22, 2017
- Full case name: Stacy Fry and Brent Fry, as next friends of minor E.F. v. Napoleon Community Schools, Pamela Barnes, Jackson County Intermediate School District
- Docket no.: 15-497
- Citations: 580 U.S. 154 (more) 137 S. Ct. 743; 197 L. Ed. 2d 46
- Argument: Oral argument
- Opinion announcement: Opinion announcement

Case history
- Prior: 788 F.3d 622 (6th Cir. 2015); cert. granted, 136 S. Ct. 2540 (2016).
- Subsequent: See the Subsequent development section

Holding
- Exhaustion of the Individuals with Disabilities Education Act's (IDEA's) administrative procedures is unnecessary where the gravamen of the plaintiff’s suit is something other than the denial of the IDEA’s core guarantee of a free appropriate public education (FAPE). Furthermore, the court should properly analyze the gravamen of a plaintiff's charges to determine if those charges seek relief for a denial of FAPE, per the test set out by the Court (see below for more information on this). The Sixth Circuit vacated and remanded.

Court membership
- Chief Justice John Roberts Associate Justices Anthony Kennedy · Clarence Thomas; Ruth Bader Ginsburg · Stephen Breyer; Samuel Alito · Sonia Sotomayor; Elena Kagan

Case opinions
- Majority: Kagan, joined by Roberts, Kennedy, Ginsburg, Breyer, Sotomayor
- Concurrence: Alito (in part), joined by Thomas

Laws applied
- Handicapped Children's Protection Act of 1986; Individuals with Disabilities Education Act; Americans with Disabilities Act; Rehabilitation Act

Fry v. Napoleon Community Schools, 580 U.S. 154 (2017), is a United States Supreme Court case in which the Court held that the Handicapped Children's Protection Act of 1986 does not command exhaustion of state-level administrative remedies codified in the Individuals with Disabilities Education Act (IDEA) when the gravamen of the plaintiff's lawsuit is not related to the denial of free appropriate public education (FAPE).

== Background ==
Minor Ehlena Fry was born with spastic quadriplegic cerebral palsy, which significantly impairs her motor skills and mobility. Ehlena Fry, originally in an orphanage in Calcutta, India, was adopted by Stacy and Brent Fry. In 2008, Fry's pediatrician prescribed a service dog for Ehlena; the community ran a fundraiser so that the Fry family could purchase a service dog for their adopted daughter. The service dog Wonder would help Ehlena Fry, amongst other things, open doors, turn on lights, pick up dropped items, help her remove her coat, and help her balance while she transferred from her walker onto a chair or the toilet. The administration of Ezra Eby Elementary School (one of the Napoleon Community Schools), however, denied permission to bring her service dog to school for the 2009–2010 school year. Under the Individuals with Disabilities Education Act, schools are obligated to provide disabled children the Individualized Education Program (IEP) in order to provide them free appropriate public education (FAPE). The school district argued that a human aide can provide all the necessary help so that Ehlena Fry can get free and appropriate public education. The school's decision to prohibit Wonder was upheld in the meeting held in January 2010 related to Fry's IEP. The Fry family maintained that the service dog, which had time to bond with Ehlena, is necessary as a bridge to her independence, and that the right to bring her service dog is covered by the Americans with Disabilities Act (ADA).

Once the American Civil Liberties Union intervened to represent the Frys, the school allowed Ehlena Fry to bring Wonder for the "trial period" (from April 2010 until the end of the school year); however, Wonder was not allowed to accompany Ehlena Fry during lunch time, in library, in computer labs, during recess, and during any other school activities. Wonder also had to sit at the back of the classroom whenever a class was in session. After the trial period, the school informed the Frys that Ehlena would not be allowed to bring Wonder to school during the 2010–2011 school year. The Frys homeschooled their daughter for the 2010–2011 school year. During that time, the Frys filed a complaint to the Office of Civil Rights of the United States Department of Education, which issued a determination letter that the school violated Ehlena Fry's rights protected by the Americans with Disabilities Act "by failing to modify their policies, practices, or procedures to permit the student's service animal to accompany her to and assist her at school, thus denying and/or significantly limiting the student's ability to access the district's programs and activities with as much independence as possible". The school, without accepting the OCR's determinations, eventually allowed the Frys to bring her service dog, starting from the 2012–2013 school year; but feeling that Ehlena and Wonder were still not welcomed by the administration, the family transferred to a school in a neighbouring county which allowed Fry to bring her service dog. The Fry family sued the Napoleon Community Schools, the principal of Ezra Eby Elementary School, and the school district under the Americans with Disabilities Act and the Rehabilitation Act, for damages for the 2009–2010, 2010–2011, and 2011-2012 school years for the following: the denial of equal access; the denial of the use of Wonder; interference to form bonds with other kids; denial of an opportunity to interact with other children; and emotional distress and pain, embarrassment, mental anguish, inconvenience, and loss of enjoyment. The Napoleon Community Schools moved to dismiss the lawsuit for failing to exhaust the IDEA administrative remedies. The Frys countered that since they seek for the declaratory judgement that the school violated the ADA and money damages for emotional distress, both of which are not the type of remedies available under the IDEA. They also argued that they do not accuse the school of not providing free and appropriate public education. For these reasons, they argued that the administrative remedy exhaustion requirement does not apply.

== Legislative background ==
The Education for All Handicapped Children Act (EHA or EAHCA) was enacted in 1975, to require all public schools accepting public funds to provide equal access to education to children with disabilities via a personalized education plan with parents' input. The EHA's name was changed to the Individuals with Disabilities Education Act (IDEA) in 1990. Besides the IDEA, there are other federal statutes covering the rights of people with disabilities, including, but not limited to, Title II of the Americans with Disabilities Act (ADA), 42 U.S.C. §12131 et seq., and §504 of the Rehabilitation Act, 29 U.S.C. §794. Title II of the ADA mandates public facilities to make "reasonable modifications" to avoid discriminating against people with disabilities. Similarly, the Rehabilitation Act demands certain modifications to existing practices to accommodate people with disabilities. Both statutes allow individuals to bring suits for relief or damages to have their grievances addressed.

The interaction between these three laws was addressed by the Supreme Court of the United States in Smith v. Robinson 468 U.S. 992 (1984). In Smith, the plaintiffs brought their claims not just under the EHA, but also the virtually identical claims under the Rehabilitation Act and the Equal Protection Clause. The Supreme Court ruled that any claims brought under the Rehabilitation Act and the Equal Protection Clause are preempted by the EHA, as the EHA, with its "comprehensive" and "carefully tailored" provisions, was intended to be the exclusive means for the parents to challenge the adequacy of the school's accommodation for their disabled child. Congress was quick to overrule Smith by enacting the Handicapped Children's Protection Act of 1986. It also added a carefully defined administrative remedy exhaustion requirement, codified at 20 U.S.C. §1415(l). The text of this statute is read as follows:

Nothing in [the IDEA] shall be construed to restrict or limit the rights, procedures, and remedies available under the Constitution, the [Americans with Disabilities Act], title V of the Rehabilitation Act [including §504], or other Federal laws protecting the rights of children with disabilities, except that before the filing of a civil action under such laws seeking relief that is also available under [the IDEA], the [IDEA's administrative procedures] shall be exhausted to the same extent as would be required had the action been brought under [the IDEA].

The issue in this case was how the scope of this exhaustion requirement should be interpreted, the question which caused a circuit split.

== Ruling by the lower courts ==
Judge Lawrence Paul Zatkoff of the United States District Court for the Eastern District of Michigan agreed with the schools and dismissed the lawsuit because the claims necessarily implicated the IDEA, which required plaintiffs to exhaust all administrative remedies before suing under the ADA and Rehabilitation Act. The Frys appealed and argued that the exhaustion requirement did not apply because they were seeking damages, which is not the sort of relief the IDEA provided.

The United States Court of Appeals for the Sixth Circuit affirmed the district court's dismissal in a 2-1 ruling, with Judges John M. Rogers and Bernice B. Donald forming the majority. The majority of the Sixth Circuit held that the Frys’ claims were essentially educational—particularly, they noted that "developing a bond with Wonder that allows E.F. to function more independently outside the classroom is an educational goal". Therefore, this is precisely the sort of claims the IDEA was meant to address, and therefore the exhaustion requirement applied.

Judge Martha Craig Daughtrey dissented. Judge Daughtrey wrote that since Frys' request to bring Wonder to school was not related to Ehlena's academic program – hence not educational in nature – there is no reason for the administrative remedy exhaustion requirement to apply. Particularly, she observed that "[the Frys'] request could be honored simply by modifying the school policy allowing guide dogs to include service dogs" (emphasis original).

== Supreme Court of the United States ==
The Frys applied to the Supreme Court of the United States. The federal government also filed a brief recommending that the Supreme Court grant the writ of certiorari, arguing that the Sixth Circuit incorrectly decided the case in favour of the respondents. The Supreme Court granted certiorari on June 28, 2016. Amicus briefs in support of the Fry family were filed by National Disability Rights Network, Council of Parent Attorneys and Advocates, Psychiatric Service Dog Partners, and Autism Speaks. Former Senator Lowell P. Weicker Jr., who was actively involved in drafting many disability rights laws including the ones in this issue (Handicapped Children's Protection Act, Individuals with Disabilities Education Act, Americans with Disabilities Act), also filed an amicus brief supporting the petitioners arguing that the Sixth Circuit's ruling runs contrary to the Congress's intent. The National School Boards Association filed a brief supporting the respondents, urging the nation's highest court to uphold the process meant to encourage that the parent and the school work together for the child's special education needs. The oral argument took place on October 31, 2016; the Supreme Court released its opinion on February 22, 2017.

== Supreme Court Opinion ==
The Supreme Court of the United States announced the opinion on February 22, 2017. The opinion of the Court was written by Justice Elena Kagan, joined by the Chief Justice, Justices Anthony Kennedy, Ruth Bader Ginsburg, Stephen Breyer, and Sonia Sotomayor. Justice Samuel Alito filed an opinion concurring in part and concurring in the judgment, joined by Justice Clarence Thomas.

=== Opinion of the Court ===
==== Part I ====
The Court reviews the history of the Individuals with Disabilities Education Act, the law at issue in this case, and also reviews the facts of this case.

==== Part II ====
On the merits, the Court held the following.

- The IDEA's remedy exhaustion requirement does not apply when a lawsuit seeks relief unrelated to the denial of a free appropriate public education (FAPE).
- To determine if a lawsuit seeks relief for the denial of a FAPE or not, a court should examine the gravamen – equivalently, the substance – of the plaintiff's complaint.

To reach the first conclusion, the Court focused on the language of the relevant section (specifically, 20 U.S.C. §1415(l), which covers the administrative exhaustion requirement), which "requires that a plaintiff exhaust IDEA's procedures before filing an action under ADA, the Rehabilitation Act, or similar laws when (but only when) her suit 'seek[s] relief that is also available' under the IDEA". The opinion, quoting Black's Law Dictionary, noted that the "relief" for lawsuits means the "redress or benefit" that can be conferred upon a favourable judgement. Further, the opinion noted that a relief is "available" when it is "accessible or may be obtained", this time quoting Ross v. Blake. Thus, in the Court's view, analyzing when the IDEA enables a person to obtain relief is paramount to determining the scope of the exhaustion requirement. The court's opinion noted that the Congress declared the IDEA is "to ensure that all children with disabilities have available to them a free appropriate public education" (quoting §1400(d)(1)(A)). Therefore, the IDEA's administrative remedies are meant to test whether a school completed their obligation to provide a child meaningful access to a free appropriate public education – in other words, "a FAPE denial is the sine qua non". If a type of accommodation will fulfill the IDEA's requirement, then the administrative officer orders such relief. However, even though another law besides the IDEA may require an accommodation on alternative grounds, the officer nonetheless cannot order such relief if it does not touch on a FAPE denial. In the Court's view, this is precisely the line that the law dictates. For example, in the case of Smith, which compelled the Congress to amend the relevant law, the petitioner would not be able to evade the exhaustion requirement by bringing a lawsuit under a different law because her lawsuit concerned the denial of a FAPE. However, if a lawsuit is brought under a different law such as the Americans with Disabilities Act and the Rehabilitation Act and does not concern the denial of a FAPE, then the IDEA administrative officer cannot grant the parents any relief. Therefore, the exhaustion is not required in this case. Since it is possible for a school's refusal to allow certain accommodation to injure a child in a way that is unrelated to a FAPE, in such circumstances the administrative remedy exhaustion does not apply. The Court again emphasized that "the only 'relief' the IDEA makes 'available' is relief for the denial of a FAPE".

Then the Court laid out a test that lower courts should use to decide whether a plaintiff seeks relief for the denial of a FAPE or not. Noting that the IDEA asks whether a lawsuit "seeks" relief available under the IDEA, the Court wrote that the court should look at the gravamen – or the substance – of a plaintiff's complaint. This way, the lower courts can set aside any attempts of artful pleading made to circumvent the exhaustion requirement by using certain labels. If the gravamen covers the denial of a FAPE, then the exhaustion requirement applies; otherwise, it does not. However, this is not to say that three laws in question (the IDEA, the ADA, the Rehabilitation Act) do not overlap in coverage. Yet, there are some important differences: the IDEA only covers children and adolescents and covers their schooling only; on the other hand, the ADA and the Rehabilitation Act are intended to root out any disability-based discriminations, and cover people with disabilities of all ages. After noting the key differences between the three laws, the Court laid out the three-prong test to determine whether the gravamen of a complaint concerns the denial of a FAPE rather than disability-based discrimination, in the form of questions, two of which are hypothetical in nature:

- The first prong: could the plaintiff have brought essentially the same claim if the conduct had occurred at a public facility other than a school, such as a public theatre or a public library?
- The second prong: could an adult, not a child, conceivably have brought the essentially identical lawsuit?
- The third prong: does the history of the proceedings indicate that the gravamen is related to the denial of a FAPE?

Thus, if the answer to the first two questions is yes, then it is likely that the lawsuit does not concern the denial of a FAPE. Then the Court provided a hypothetical situation where this is the case. Suppose that the family of a wheelchair-using child sues her school for discrimination under the ADA without touching on the denial of a FAPE due to the school's lack of access ramps. One may argue that this may be related to the denial of a FAPE: after all, if a child has difficulty accessing the school building, then she cannot receive education; besides, if someone has to carry her over, then the child may not achieve independence needed for her academic success. Yet, it is possible for the child to file the essentially identical lawsuit against a public library lacking such access ramps. Furthermore, it is possible for a visitor to the school to file the essentially identical complaint against the school. Therefore, this lawsuit most likely is concerned with equality of access to facilities, which is in the domain of disability-based discrimination rather than the adequacy of the school's FAPE-related accommodations.

On the other hand, if the answer to the first two questions is no, then such lawsuit cannot avoid the exhaustion requirement. For instance, suppose that a student with a learning disability sues his school under the ADA for failing to provide additional tutoring in mathematics. This could be considered disability-based discrimination; however, such lawsuit fails under the test devised by the Court, even though the complaint does not mention the denial of a FAPE anywhere. First, it is unlikely that this student can press the identical lawsuit against a public library. Second, it is inconceivable that an adult visitor or an adult employee of the school will press such lawsuit. Hence, the substance of the student's complaint is related to the denial of a FAPE, so this student must exhaust the administrative procedures first.

The third prong touches on the history of the proceedings, which might suggest that the lawsuit is related to the denial of a FAPE. If a plaintiff formally invoked the IDEA's administrative procedures before switching the course, that can possibly suggest that the gravamen of the complaint is related to a FAPE denial. While it is possible for a plaintiff to realize in the middle of the procedure that the school completed their obligations and that their complaints are unrelated to a FAPE, such formal invocation of the IDEA procedures may serve as evidence that the gravamen of the plaintiff's claim concerns the FAPE denial.

==== Part III ====
In the last part of the opinion, the Court revisited the Frys' claims and attempted to apply the test it laid out to Frys' claims. The Court noted that the Frys' complaint only discusses disability-based discrimination, such as the school district's "refusal to allow Wonder to act as a service dog discriminated against [E.F.] as a person with disabilities ... by denying her equal access" to public facilities. Not only did it not state that Wonder enhances E.F.'s educational opportunities, but the Frys agreed with the school district's assertion that E.F.'s educational needs were satisfied by a one-on-one human aide. The Frys' instead focused on the infringement of E.F.'s right to equal access, as the Office of Civil Rights found.

The Court also concluded that nothing in the Frys' suit suggests any focus on the educational needs. It noted that the Frys' claims will probably pass the first prong, as the Frys could have filed the same lawsuit if a public library refused to allow Wonder to enter the building. The claims will likely pass the second prong as well because a disabled adult could have levelled the essentially same charges if the adult's service dog was refused access to public facilities such as a school, for not adhering to the equal access requirements as codified in the Americans with Disabilities Act (ADA). Based on the information before the Court, it concludes that the Frys' claims are the type of claims that focus on disability-based discrimination rather than the denial of a free appropriate public education. However, the Court declined to undertake the analysis for the third prong, as neither parties addressed the history of the Frys' proceedings. The Court thus vacated the Sixth Circuit's judgment and remanded the case so that the Sixth Circuit can determine whether, for example, the Frys pursued the IDEA's formal procedures before filing the case. If the Frys started from that road, then the lower court should determine whether such actions reveal that the substance of the Frys' complains is related to the denial of a FAPE.

=== Alito's partial concurrence ===
Justice Samuel Alito, joined by Justice Clarence Thomas, joined Part I and the parts of Part II regarding the Court's first conclusion on the merits. Alito wrote that he (along with Justice Thomas) declined to join the later part of the Court's opinion where the court laid out the test for the lower courts to use when examining the gravamen of the plaintiff's complaint. Specifically, Alito wrote that the court's test would work well only if there is no overlap between the relief available under the IDEA and the relief provided by other federal laws (including the Rehabilitation Act, Americans with Disabilities Act (ADA), the United States Constitution, inter alia), yet the court admitted that there may be instances when there is such overlap. Alito also disagreed with the third prong of the court's test, which in part stated that the lower court should examine whether (and to what extent) the parents pursued but later abandoned the IDEA's formal procedures before filing a formal lawsuit under the ADA or the Rehabilitation Act. Alito criticized the court for failing to take into other factors that may have led the plaintiff to pursue the IDEA's formal procedure first, such as being advised by their attorney to pursue the IDEA procedure before abandoning it, or the parents amending their complaints to give up parts of the relief available under the IDEA and turn to another federal statute in the course of their lawsuit. Calling them "misleading clues", Alito concluded that the test laid out by the court will invite more confusion and lead the lower courts astray.

== Reactions ==
Michael Steinberg, the legal director of the American Civil Liberties Union in Michigan, which has represented Fry throughout her legal proceedings, praised the ruling, stating that "[w]e're thrilled that the Supreme Court has torn down unfair barriers faced by students who seek to vindicate their rights under the Americans with Disabilities Act". Stacy Fry, Ehlena's mother, also praised the ruling in her statement: "[w]e are thankful that the Supreme Court has clarified that schools cannot treat children with disabilities differently or stand in the way of their desired independence." She also added that "We feel that this really is a victory for our family and all the families with children of differing abilities. For us, it really means that we did the right thing. It was not in vain. We had a bigger purpose". The National School Boards Association expressed concerns, stating that the court's ruling may lead lower courts astray as the lower courts try to apply the law. Naomi Gittins, the managing director of legal advocacy for the NSBA, stated that "[g]oing right to court is never a good approach when you're talking about educational issues[.] It could result in court cases that run up bills rather than a parent talking about this with the school". Writing for SCOTUSblog, Amy Howe wrote that the Court's ruling is "a significant win – not only for [Ehlena Fry] and her family, but also for children with disabilities nationwide".

== Subsequent development ==
Upon remand, on 25 September 2019, the United States District Court for the Eastern District of Michigan directed that the case be set a trial by jury. The case was ultimately settled on 14 November 2019, under undisclosed terms.

On March 21, 2023, the Supreme Court issued a unanimous ruling in Luna Perez v. Sturgis Public Schools, 598 U.S. ___ (2023) which highlighted that the IDEA administrative exhaustion requirements did not apply to claims that are not covered under the IDEA relief/remedy.

== See also ==
- Americans with Disabilities Act
- Rehabilitation Act
- Education for All Handicapped Children Act
- Individuals with Disabilities Education Act
- Free appropriate public education (FAPE)
- Individualized Education Program (IEP)
- Board of Education of the Hendrick Hudson Central School District v. Rowley
