= New York City Board of Education v. Tom F. =

- Supreme Court of the United States

Argued October 1, 2007 Decided October 10, 2007
- Full case name: Board of Education of the City School District of the City of New York v. Tom F., on Behalf of Gilbert F., a Minor Child
- Docket no.: 06-637
- Citations: 552 U.S. 1 (more) 128 S. Ct. 1; 169 L. Ed. 2d 1

Holding
- The judgment is affirmed by an equally divided Court.

Court membership
- Chief Justice John Roberts Associate Justices John P. Stevens · Antonin Scalia; Anthony Kennedy · David Souter; Clarence Thomas · Ruth Bader Ginsburg; Stephen Breyer · Samuel Alito

Case opinion
- Per curiam
- Kennedy took no part in the consideration or decision of the case.

Laws applied
- Individuals with Disabilities Education Act

New York City Board of Education v. Tom F., 552 U.S. 1 (2007), is a legal case in the United States. The case involves the Individuals with Disabilities Education Act (IDEA) and tuition reimbursement. The case was granted certiorari by the Supreme Court. Oral arguments took place October 1, 2007. The Court ruled in favor of Tom F. nine days later, on October 10, 2007, affirming the appellate court's decision with a 4–4 split. The decision did not list which justices voted which way, except that Associate Justice Anthony Kennedy did not take part. Note that as a majority of justices failed to adopt an opinion in favor of either the school district or the student, the decision of the lower appellate court, permitting tuition reimbursement, remained unaltered.

== Facts ==
The Individuals with Disabilities Education Act (IDEA) requires the U.S. states to provide students with disabilities a "free appropriate public education." Because the New York City Department of Education did not have an "Individualized Education Program" for former Viacom executive Tom Freston's son Gilbert, Freston enrolled his son in the Stephen Gaynor School, a private school for special needs students. The school district reimbursed Freston for tuition to the school. Two years later the school district offered a place for Gilbert at a different public school. Freston declined the offer and again sought reimbursement for private school tuition.

A United States district court ruled that because Gilbert had never been enrolled in public school, IDEA did not require the school district to reimburse Freston. As Oyez notes, the IDEA act "authorizes reimbursement for a child 'who previously received special education and related services under the authority of a public agency,' but it does not explicitly state that parents of children who have never received public education are not entitled to reimbursement."

The U.S. Court of Appeals for the Second Circuit vacated the decision of the district court on August 9, 2006, reasoning by comparing the disputed section of the act with other sections that IDEA was not intended to deny reimbursement for students never enrolled in public school. The court held that upholding the district court ruling would require parents to enroll their children in inadequate public schools as a condition of eligibility for tuition reimbursement.

The school district appealed to the Supreme Court in a November 3, 2006 petition for a writ of certiorari. The Court granted certiorari on February 26, 2007. Oral arguments were scheduled for October 1, 2007.

Amicus curiae briefs were filed by:

- On behalf of the New York City Board of Education by the Board of Education of the City School District of the City of New York, the National School Boards Association, the New York State School Boards Association, and the Council of the Great City Schools
- On behalf of Tom F. by the United States (by the Solicitor General), International Dyslexia Association (with the New York branch of the IDA, National Alliance on Mental Illness, Mental Health America, and the Bazelon Center for Mental Health Law), Autism Speaks, the Council of Parent Attorneys and Advocates (with the New Jersey Special Education Practitioners), and National Disability Rights Network (with the New York Lawyers for the Public Interest), and Agudath Israel of America

== Question ==
Does the holding of the United States Court of Appeals for the Second Circuit, stating that the Individuals with Disabilities Education Act permits tuition reimbursement where a child has not previously received special education from a public agency, stand in direct contradiction to the plain language of 20 U.S.C. §1412(a)(10)(C)(ii) which authorizes tuition reimbursement to the parents of a disabled child "who previously received special education and related services under the authority of a public agency"?

== See also ==
- Burlington School Comm. v. Mass. Dept. Of Ed.
- Winkelman v. Parma City School District
- List of United States Supreme Court cases, volume 552
