= Luna Perez v. Sturgis Public Schools =

- Supreme Court of the United States

Argued January 18, 2023 Decided March 21, 2023
- Full case name: Miguel Luna Perez v. Sturgis Public Schools, et al.
- Docket no.: 21-887
- Citations: 598 U.S. 142 (more)
- Argument: Oral argument
- Opinion announcement: Opinion announcement

Case history
- Prior: Perez v. Sturgis Public Schools, 3 F. 4th 236 (6th Cir. 2021), Perez ex rel. Perez v. Sturgis Public Schools, 2019 WL 6907138, *3–*4 (WD Mich. Dec. 19, 2019)

Holding
- An Americans with Disability Act suit seeking compensatory damages for denial of a Free and Appropriate Public Education (FAPE) can proceed without exhausting the administrative procedures of the Individuals with Disabilities Education Act (IDEA).

Court membership
- Chief Justice John Roberts Associate Justices Clarence Thomas · Samuel Alito; Sonia Sotomayor · Elena Kagan; Neil Gorsuch · Brett Kavanaugh; Amy Coney Barrett · Ketanji Brown Jackson

Case opinion
- Majority: Gorsuch, joined by unanimous

Laws applied
- Handicapped Children's Protection Act of 1986; Individuals with Disabilities Education Act; Americans with Disabilities Act of 1990; Rehabilitation Act of 1973

Luna Perez v. Sturgis Public Schools, 598 U.S. 142 (2023), was a United States Supreme Court decision in which the Court held that an Americans with Disabilities Act (ADA) lawsuit seeking compensatory damages for denial of a Free and Appropriate Public Education (FAPE) can proceed without exhausting the administrative procedures of the Individuals with Disabilities Education Act (IDEA), because compensatory damages are not available under IDEA. This case holds significant implications for disabled students who allege they were failed by school officials.

== Background ==
After moving from Mexico to the US, Miguel Luna Perez, a deaf student, attended schools in Michigan's Sturgis Public Schools District from the ages of 9 to 20, a 12 year period from 2004 to 2016. Under his individualized education program (IEP), Sturgis schools were to provide classroom aides who interpreted to translate classroom instruction into sign language. However, Perez's parents alleged that Sturgis failed to provide qualified interpreters. In fact, Sturgis never provided Perez with a qualified sign language interpreter. Notably, one aide/interpreter assigned to Perez from approximately 2006 to May 2016, Gayle Cunningham, did not know sign language but did attempt to teach herself. Cunningham never had any official training or certification in sign language. Cunningham was Perez's sole facilitator of communication in the classroom. It was also alleged the district failed to properly evaluate her interpreting ability and misrepresented her skills and abilities to Perez's family.

Cunningham "essentially invented the signing system she used" and her "command of sign language remained so poor that, when briefly paired with a different deaf student who used sign language, the other deaf student could not understand her at all." Perez had no way of knowing what was actually being said around him because he had no independent understanding of what was being said. Perez's parents further alleged that the interpreters were absent from class for hours on end. This was because, beginning in 2015, Cunningham was given other duties away from Perez, leaving him with no means to communicate with others. It was alleged that he was learning nothing in his classes due to the absence of a qualified sign language interpreter. Perez was also excluded from the English Language Learner program that the school district offered as an extracurricular activity because he was deaf.

Sturgis Schools misrepresented Perez's educational progress and academic achievement, awarding him inflated grades and advancing him no matter his actual progress. He was given As and Bs in nearly every class and was on the Honor Roll every semester. His parents had assumed that he was on track to earn a high-school diploma. In March 2016, just months before his anticipated graduation from high school that June, he and his parents were informed he would not be awarded a high school diploma but a certificate of completion.

=== Michigan Department of Education Administrative Complaint ===
In response to these revelations, Perez and his family filed an administrative complaint in December 2017 with the Michigan Department of Education (MDE). The complaint alleged Sturgis denied him an adequate education and violated several federal and state disability laws: the Individuals with Disabilities Education Act (IDEA), the Americans with Disabilities Act (ADA), the Rehabilitation Act, and two Michigan disabilities laws. The complaint alleged that Sturgis Public Schools had failed to meet its requirements under the IDEA and did not provide Perez with a Free Appropriate Public Education (FAPE).

In June 2018 a written settlement offer was provided to Perez's family from the school district. Prior to a hearing before the MDE, the Perez family and Sturgis Public Schools settled the IDEA/FAPE complaint. Sturgis Schools agreed to provide Perez with all the "forward-looking equitable relief he sought," including paying for Perez to attend the Michigan School for the Deaf (MSD) in Flint. Perez eventually graduated from MSD in June 2020 with a high school diploma. The school district also agreed to pay for "post-secondary compensatory education", for sign language instruction for Perez and his family and the family's attorney's fees. The Administrative Law Judge (ALJ) dismissed the case and remaining claims in August 2018 with prejudice.

=== Federal District Court holding ===
In December 2018, Perez and his family filed a federal complaint against the school district in the United States District Court for the Western District of Michigan under the Americans with Disabilities Act (ADA).

It was alleged the school discriminated against him by not providing the resources necessary for him to participate fully in class. Along with declaratory relief, Perez sought compensatory damages for his emotional distress.

Sturgis Schools filed a motion and argued that IDEA 20 U. S. C. §1415(l), barred Perez from bringing an ADA claim without first exhausting all of IDEA's administrative dispute resolution procedures. The district court agreed with Sturgis and granted the Sturgis motion, and dismissed the litigation. The District Court dismissed the ADA claim for failure to exhaust and declined to exercise supplemental jurisdiction over the remaining state-law claims. Perez and his family filed a timely appeal to the United States Court of Appeals for the Sixth Circuit.

=== Sixth Circuit holding ===
The case was argued October 9, 2020, before a three judge panel in the United States Court of Appeals for the Sixth Circuit. The court issued its opinion on June 25, 2021. It was argued before Judge Danny Julian Boggs, Jane Branstetter Stranch, and Amul Thapar. The Sixth Circuit held that "sometimes a school falls short in providing a "free appropriate public education (FAPE)". When this happens, parents can seek redress through the IDEA, which encourages informal conflict resolution, but there is an increasingly formal mechanism if disagreement persists.

The Sixth Circuit held that Perez could sue under federal laws protecting the rights of children with disabilities, including the ADA, but the IDEA's "full administrative process" must be completed (20 U.S.C. 1415(l)).

Because Perez settled his complaint before completing the administrative process, he was not eligible to receive compensation, which according to the court, included compensation for the educational loss and other claims.

The court asked if this barred his ADA suit and stated it depended on three questions.

1. Is his case subject to the IDEA's exhaustion provision?
2. If so, has Perez exhausted the IDEA's administrative procedures to the extent necessary?
3. And if he has not, should we allow his suit to proceed anyway?

The court looked to Fry v. Napoleon Community Schools, 580 U.S. 154 (2017). Believing the Supreme Court to hold "Is the crux of the complaint the denial of a free appropriate public education? (describing the key as whether the complaint's (citation removed) essence—even though not its wording—is the provision of a [free appropriate public education]"). If so, the exhaustion requirement should apply."

The court held that under Fry, "it's clear that Perez seeks relief for the school's failure to meet its IDEA obligations."

The court even noted that Perez was not seeking relief for the denial of FAPE under a specific remedy that was and is not available under IDEA: compensatory damages for emotional distress. Therefore the choice of remedy/relief in the Sixth Circuit at the time did not matter. Covington v. Knox Cnty. Sch. Sys., 205 F.3d 912, 916–17 (6th Cir. 2000). Most other circuits agree. See id. (collecting cases); McMillen v. New Caney Indep. Sch. Dist., 939 F.3d 640, 647–48 (5th Cir. 2019).

The Court then again turned to Fry for reference: "the focus of the analysis is not the kind of relief the plaintiff wants but the kind of harm he wants relief from. We thus agree that Fry's analysis "comports with reading ‘relief’ to focus on the conduct the plaintiff complains about." McMillen, 939 F.3d at 648" The court used this logic to buttress the fact that Perez's claim for relief was subject to the IDEA's administrative exhaustion requirements.

It was held that because he settled the matter and did not follow the full Administrative procedures, he could only sue under the ADA only if he could also bring an IDEA action in court.

Perez argued that it would have been futile to file an ADA claim under the IDEA and go through the exhaustion of the IDEA claim because the administrative process can not provide for damages for his emotional distress. Perez argued that judicial estoppel prevents Sturgis from invoking the exhaustion requirement. The court did not find either argument persuasive.

The Court noted, "Section 1415(l) does not come with a "futility" exception, and the Supreme Court has instructed us not to create exceptions to statutory exhaustion requirements."

==== Sixth Circuit Dissent ====
Judge Jane Branstetter Stranch issued a dissent. She highlighted, unlike the majority, that the Supreme Court in Fry gave lower courts the framework for evaluating the relief plaintiffs seek and exhausting the IDEA's remedies under the law. It was her view on the motion to dismiss reading the complaint in Perez's favor. In her dissent, she highlights the differences between who is covered by the IDEA, ADA, and Title II of the Rehabilitation Act of 1973.

Judge Stranch read the exhaustion requirement to apply when a suit "seek[s] relief that is also available" under the IDEA and a suit seeks relief available under the IDEA when it seeks relief for the denial of a FAPE, a free appropriate public education."

The dissent went on to say that because the majority was misconstruing Perez's allegation as "simple discrimination in an education context," she highlights that the majority replicates the errors of the Sixth Circuit's pre-Fry approach, where the Supreme Court in Fry had reversed the Sixth Circuit.

The dissent then looks to the sister circuits and highlights how the Sixth Circuit is at odds with them. "Perez, as "master of his claim," filed a cognizable complaint under the ADA that is supported by the governing precedent of the Supreme Court and this Circuit. The majority opinion ignores that precedent and places us at odds with our sister circuits. Because it is wrong to dismiss this case, I respectfully dissent."

== Amicus curiae briefs in the Supreme Court ==
=== For Perez ===
The Biden Administration via the Department of Justice filed a brief in support of the Perez family. The Department of Justice highlighted portions of the Sixth Circuit's opinion that the DOJ saw as needing remediation. The Department of Justice's view was that Section 1415(l)'s exhaustion requirement does not apply because compensatory damages available under the ADA is not available under the IDEA.

Former United States Senator Tom Harkin and Representatives Tony Coelho and George Miller filed amici curiae briefs in support of the Perez family. They were members of Congress when the IDEA was passed and were involved in the amendment and reauthorization.

They argued that the exhaustion provision was crafted to be narrow only when seeking relief that is also available under the IDEA. The legislators stated "Specifically, Congress enacted § 1415(l) to overturn the Supreme Court's holding in Smith v. Robinson, 468 U.S. 992 (1984). In Smith, this Court held that the Education for All Handicapped Children Act (the “EHA”) provided the exclusive rights and procedures for challenging the failure to provide a free appropriate public education, precluding substantively identical claims under both the Constitution and other laws. Id. at 1011–13, 1019–21."

In closing the brief Harkin, Miller and Coelho highlighted "as this case illustrates, children with disabilities have available remedies under the ADA or related laws that often exceed the remedies available under the IDEA. Congress did not mean for the IDEA to leave children with disabilities worse off, by preempting their general rights and remedies, or by imposing procedural obstacles that would not otherwise apply."

A joint amici curiae brief filed by the ARC of the United States, The Autistic Self Advocacy Network, Communication First, the Coelho Center for Disability Law, Policy and Innovation, Council of Parent Attorneys and Advocates, Education Law Center, Innisfree Foundation, Learning Rights Law Center, The National Center for Learning Disabilities, The National Center for Youth Law, the National Disability Rights Network, and the National Federation of the Blind.

=== For Sturgis Public Schools ===
A joint brief of AASA, The School Superintendents Association, the Council of Administrators of Special Education, The American Physical Therapy Association, the Association of School Business Officials International, the National Association of Pupil Services Administrators, and the National Association of School Nurses was filed with the court. The brief attempted to claim "weakening the exhaustion requirement will undermine the collaborative nature of the IDEA process, and will shift the parties’ focus to money rather than the student's education needs, will waste money on litigation that could more effectively be spent on students themselves, and will discourage settlements by making them more expensive."

The brief attempts to shift from the case at hand to a hypothetical case of "Timothy", a student in a Texas school district who has autism. Unlike Perez, Timothy had not been in school in years. The hypothetical case then goes on to talk about how Timothy's parents removed him from the public school district to a private school and now the district is being asked to pay for education, but that the district does not know where the money goes. They further attempted to argue that students and parents could avoid the administrative exhaustion requirements by seeking monetary damages and therefore weaken the collaborative approach of IDEA.

"Overturning the Sixth Circuit's decision would open the floodgates for parents seeking monetary gain for claims that most likely could have been resolved using the IDEA's collaborative processes of IEP meetings, resolution sessions, mediations, or due process hearings."

== Opinion of the Supreme Court ==
The Court unanimously reversed the Sixth Circuit's judgment and remanded the case. The court clarified that the IDEA did not bar Perez from pursuing his ADA claims, allowing him to seek monetary damages unavailable under IDEA. The case was sent back to the lower courts to continue litigation, as the administrative exhumation requirements under IDEA §1415(l) did not preclude Perez's lawsuit.

"Because §1415(l)’s exhaustion requirement applies only to suits that “see[k] relief . . . also available under” IDEA, it poses no bar where a non-IDEA plaintiff sues for a remedy that is unavailable under IDEA. This interpretation admittedly treats “remedies” as synonymous with the “relief” a plaintiff “seek[s].” But that is how an ordinary reader would interpret the provision, based on a number of contextual clues. " Justice Neil Gorsuch wrote in the opinion that Perez' arguments "better comports with the statute's terms."

Justice Gorsuch, writing the unanimous opinion, highlighted the case's impact on "a great many children with disabilities and their parents."

== Reactions ==
The superintendent of the Sturgis Public Schools district, Dr. Arthur Ebert, responded to the news of the case by stating that "he was not in a position to comment on the details or outcome of the case." Roman Martinez, the Perez's family lawyer, stated in an email about the case: “We are thrilled with today's decision. The Court's ruling vindicates the rights of students with disabilities to obtain full relief when they suffer discrimination. Miguel and his family look forward to pursuing their legal claims under the Americans with Disabilities Act.”

It has been noted this case allows families of disabled students to force schools and school districts to have meaningful interactions to address disabilities and not pay lip service to the Free Appropriate Public Education requirements. Some disability experts think this could help shift the balance of power between parents and schools/districts as they try to craft necessary accommodations in "contentious negotiations over the education of individual disabled students."

The Autism Alliance of Michigan (AAoM) applauded the Supreme Court's ruling, noting that Michigan has some of the lowest graduation rates for students with disabilities in the United States.

Further, some commentators believe that this case will "expand the number of cases that arguably could be brought by sidestepping the administrative hearing requirements and is likely to increase the number of cases in which we see “attempts at artful pleading” which the Fry court attempted to avoid."

== See also ==
- Education for All Handicapped Children Act
- Fry v. Napoleon Community Schools
- List of United States Supreme Court cases, volume 598
