= Easterseals Central Illinois =

Nonprofit organization in Illinois, US

- Formation: 1919
- Founder: Hugh Cooper; S.H. Easton
- Founded at: Peoria, Illinois
- Type: Nonprofit
- Legal status: charity
- Purpose: help people reach their full potential
- Headquarters: 507 E Armstrong Ave, Peoria, Illinois, 61603
- Origins: medical clinic
- Region served: Central Illinois
- Services: physical therapy; occupational therapy; speech therapy; feeding therapy
- Official language: English
- President and CEO: Melissa Riddle
- Vice President of Clinical Services: Eric Glow
- Vice President of Operations: Brice Watson
- Director of Human Resources: Allison Gottwald
- Board of directors: Easterseals Central Illinois Board of Directors
- Affiliations: Easterseals
- Website: ci.easterseals.com

Easterseals Central Illinois is a nonprofit organization affiliated with the national Easterseals network, dedicated to providing specialized services for children and individuals with disabilities, developmental delays, and autism across Central Illinois. Originating in 1919 as a weekly clinic for children with disabilities in Peoria founded by Drs. Hugh Cooper and S.H. Easton, it formally affiliated with the National Society of Crippled Children and Adults (later Easterseals) in 1936 with the first Easter Seals sold to Peoria to fundraise—a practice that later spread nationwide.

The organization delivers a broad array of programs designed to support early development, skill-building and inclusion, including pediatric therapy, early intervention for young children, applied behavior analysis (ABA) therapy for autism, educational services, through the Easterseals Learning Academy, family support resources, and accessible recreation. A key component is the Timber Pointe Outdoor Center, a fully accessible camp facility acquired and rebranded in the 1980s, offering inclusive overnight, day and weekend camp experiences for children and families.

Easterseals Central Illinois operates six service locations throughout the region and touches thousands of lives each year. In 2024, it served 1,019 pediatric therapy clients, 2,506 early intervention clients, and 1,125 participants in its Timber Pointe camp programs.

Over its more than 100-year history, the organization has expanded from a local clinic to a comprehensive provider, establishing milestones such as the Crippled Children's Center in 1954, the Allied Agencies Center in 1969, The Autism Spectrum Disorder Early Diagnostic Clinic in 2003, and ongoing advocacy for inclusion through initiatives like puppet-based disability awareness programs and legislative efforts. It continues to emphasize early intervention, collaboration, and empowerment to help people reach their full potential.

== History ==
=== Founding and early years ===
Easterseals Central Illinois traces its origins to 1919, when Drs. Hugh Cooper and S.H. Easton initiated a weekly clinic in Peoria, Illinois, to provide care for children with disabilities. This grassroots effort addressed the limited services available at the time and laid the foundation for organized support in the region.

The clinic's activities prompted the formation of the Crippled Children's Coordinating Committee in 1919, which coordinated recourses and advocacy for children with disabilities. Through the committee's work, early initiatives expanded to include educational opportunities, resulting in the establishment of the first preschool for children with disabilities—an innovative step toward inclusive early education in the area.

These local efforts continued to grow, culminating in 1954 with the opening of the Crippled Children's Center, a dedicated facility that offered therapy services and parent training programs to support families. This center represented a key advancement in providing structured, multidisciplinary care during the organization's formative decades.

=== National affiliation and expansion ===
In 1936, the local government aligned with the National Society for Crippled Children and adults (later renamed Easterseals), marking its formal affiliation with the national network. This partnership introduced the Easter Seals fundraising campaign in Peoria, a tradition that spread nationwide and became a key funding mechanism.

Subsequent decades brought expansions through collaborations and new programs. in 1969, Easterseals Central Illinois helped launch the Allied Agencies Center, a model for collaborations among disability organizations.

In the 1970s, the organization led efforts to expand recreational access, founding the Heart of Illinois Special Recreation Association to provide inclusive opportunities for individuals with disabilities.

The 1980s saw the introduction of innovative programs, including Lekotek, which provided adapted toys and play experiences for children with disabilities. During this decade, Easterseals acquired Camp Heffernan and rebranded it as Timber Pointe Outdoor Center, establishing a dedicated site for inclusive outdoor recreation and experiential programs.

In 1993, Easterseals Central Illinois began construction on a new facility to increase capacity for clinical, diagnostic, and family support services. The building opened in 1996, incorporating specialized spaces such as areas for the University of Illinois College of Medicine's Child Development section and the Central Illinois Orofacial Anomalies Team.

=== Modern developments and autism focus ===
In the early 2000s, Easterseals Central Illinois intensified its focus on autism spectrum disorders in response to rising prevalence. In 2003, the organization opened the Autism Spectrum Disorder Early Diagnostic Clinic in collaboration with the University of Illinois College of Medicine — Peoria, providing comprehensive evaluations for young children to enable early intervention and family support. This clinic has since served thousands of children, facilitating subsequent development of specialized therapies, counseling and family-centered resources tailored to autism.

Building on this foundation, Easterseals Central Illinois established the Easterseals Learning Academy in Germantown Hills as a specialized private school for children with autism and other disabilities who require tailored educational environments beyond their home districts. The academy emphasizes personalized instruction to foster skill development and aims to support students' eventual reintegration into public schools. By 2019, it had completed its second full academic year, exemplifying the organization's evolving model for autism-specific education.

The organization has sustained legislative advocacy to advance inclusion and accessibility, while delivering disability awareness programs such as Kids on the Block, which uses puppets to educate children about disabilities, diversity, and inclusion, and Ability Awareness Initiatives to promote understanding in schools and communities. A prominent illustration of Easterseal Central Illinois's long-term impact is the story of Abbey Curran, who received childhood services from the organization. Curran, who has cerebral palsy, became Miss Iowa 2008 and the first contestant with a disability in the Miss USA pageant. She founded the Miss You Can do It Pageant, a national event celebrating girls and women with special needs, which was in an HBO documentary in 2013. These efforts reflect the organization's ongoing commitment to autism-specific services, education, and empowerment in Central Illinois.

== Mission and organization ==
=== Mission and vision ===
Easterseals Central Illinois is dedicated to supporting children with developmental delays, disabilities, and special needs through a clearly defined mission and vision. The organization's mission is to provide exceptional services to ensure that children with developmental delays, disabilities, and other special needs can reach their full potential.

The vision statement emphasizes full inclusion and empowerment, declaring: We envision our community, enriched by the diverse contributions of children who, from their very entrance into this world, are 100% included and 100% empowered. To achieve that vision, we must rise to meet the complex and evolving needs of our community. This forward-looking goal focuses on building a society where children contribute meaningfully from birth through sustained inclusion and empowerment.

Easterseals Central Illinois centers its efforts on principles of inclusion, empowerment, independence, and family-centered support. The organization pursues these aims by offering innovative therapies, inclusive programs, and unwavering assistance to families as they navigate challenges and celebrate milestones.

=== Governace and leadership ===
Easterseals Central Illinois as a 501(c)(3) nonprofit organization, is governed by a volunteer Board of Directors responsible for providing strategic oversight, ensuring fiduciary accountability, and guiding the organization's mission-focused activities.

The Board includes a leadership team of officers who direct its activities. Current officers are Chair Tim Erickson, Vice-chair Jamie Engstrom, Treasurer Todd Bryant, Secretary Amy Braet, Immediate Past Chair Meenakshy Aiyer, M.D., and assistant Secretary Brittany Personett.

The full Board comprises community leaders, professionals, and stakeholders who support the organization's work in Central Illinois. Examples of directors include Geneva Abele, Bret Cassidy, Andy Cave, Jessica Hanks, M.D., and Mark Schwamberger, among others with backgrounds in business, healthcare, law, and community service.

Day-to-day leadership is provided by the senior executive team. Melissa Riddle serves as president & CEO, with oversight of overall operations and strategic direction. Supporting executives include Eric Glow as Vice President of Clinical Services and Brice Watson as Vice President of Operations. Additional key roles are held by Allison Gottwald, Director of Human Resources, and Brittany Personett, Executive Assistant.

=== Affiliation with national Easterseals ===
Easterseals Central Illinois is an affiliate of the national Easterseals organization, a relationship that dates to 1936. In that year, the Crippled Children's Coordinating Committee, the local predecessor organization, aligned with the National Society for Crippled Children and Adults, the predecessor to the national Easterseals entity. This alignment mark the start of the formal affiliation, enabling the local government to participate in shared national initiatives, including the Easter Seals fundraising campaign.

The affiliation incorporated the local government into the national Easter seals fundraising model. That same year, Easter seals—specially designed stamps sold to raise funds—were first sold in Peoria as part of the national campaign, which had been launched in 1934 and later became a signature fundraising effort for the Easterseals network.

As part of the national Easterseals network, Easterseals Central Illinois operates under the shared Easterseals name and benefits from national branding, fundraising strategies, and organizational support to advance its mission of serving individuals with disabilities.

== Programs and services ==
=== Pediatric therapy and rehabilitation ===
Easterseals Central Illinois offers comprehensive pediatric therapy and rehabilitation services to help children with disabilities and other developmental delays build essential skills, achieve independence, and reach developmental milestones. These services include physical therapy, occupational therapy, speech therapy, and feeding therapy delivered by experienced multidisciplinary teams using individualized treatment plans tailored to each child's unique needs.

Pediatric physical therapy focuses on improving strength, coordination, mobility, and confidence, addressing challenges such as delays in walking, crawling, or sitting, cerebral palsy, toe walking, chronic pain, and post-surgical rehabilitation. Therapists create customized programs to support gross motor development in state-of-the-art facilities, including therapeutic pools, and advanced equipment.

Pediatric occupational therapy targets fine motor skills, sensory regulation, executive functional, handwriting, self-care abilities to promote independence in daily activities and school readiness. Treatment integrates engaging activities and home-based strategies to support functional growth and participation in everyday life.

Pediatric speech therapy helps children develop communication skills through targeted support for articulation, receptive and expressive language, social language, and conditions of apraxia of speech. Personalized plans aim to build confidence and enhance overall communication potential.

Pediatric feeding therapy addresses eating difficulties by improving oral-motor skills, texture tolerance, sensory-based challenges, and swallowing safety. Collaborative care involving feeding specialists, speech therapists, and dietitians empowers families with strategies to improve mealtime experiences and meet nutritional needs.

These family-centered services emphasize collaboration with parents and caregivers to set goals, track process, and celebrate achievements, with therapy often available at the Peoria and Bloomington service centers. in 2024, Easterseals Central Illinois served 1,019 pediatric therapy clients through these programs.

=== Autism services and supports ===
Easterseals Central Illinois provides comprehensive autism services and supports, focusing on early diagnostic, evidence-based therapy, and family-centered care for children with autism spectrum disorder (ASD). These services emphasize individualized plans developed in collaboration with families to promote communication, social engagement, independence, and overall growth.

Diagnostic services are offered through the Autism Spectrum Disorder Diagnostic Clinic, one of the few multidisciplinary programs in Illinois providing comprehensive evaluations for young children. The clinic conducts thorough assessments to support early diagnosis of ASD and other potential conditions, delivering clarity to families along with treatment recommendations and resources to guide next steps.

A core offering is Applied Behavior Analysis (ABA) therapy, an evidence-based approach supervised by Board Certified Behavior Analysts that delivers personalized, individualized treatment plans. ABA therapy helps children build essential skills in areas such as communication, social interactions, tolerance, transitioning, personal hygiene, and daily living while reducing challenging behaviors. Services are provided in a structured, multi-disciplinary environment involving collaboration with other specialists, with caregiver involvement to extend progress at home and in the community; they are available at the Peoria and Bloomington service centers.

=== Early intervention ===
Easterseals Central Illinois administers early intervention services for infants and toddlers from birth to three years old who have or are at risk for developmental delays or disabilities through its operation of two Child and Family Connections (CFC) offices—CFC #14 in West Peoria and CFC #16 in Champaign. These offices function as regional intake entities for the Illinois Early Intervention system, supporting families across eleven Central Illinois counties by providing initial evaluation, eligibility, determinations, and referrals to specialized services.

The program emphasizes a family-centered approach, where credentialed early intervention coordinators collaborate with families to develop individualized family service plans (IFSPs) tailored to the child's needs and family's priorities. Coordinators assist families in selecting appropriate service providers and accessing supports the promote the child's development in natural environments, such as the home or community settings, while empowering parents and caregivers with strategies to foster growth and development milestones.

In 2024, Easterseals Central Illinois served 2,506 early intervention clients through these efforts, reflecting the scale of its impact on young children and families facing developmental challenges. The organization has managed these CFC offices since July 1, 2013, as part of its broader commitment to early support that lay a foundation for future progress.

=== Education programs ===
Easterseals Central Illinois provides specialized education through its Easterseals Learning Academy, a non-public private facility approved by the Illinois State Board of Education. The academy serves students between the ages of 5 and 21 whose primary educational diagnosis includes Autism, emotional disabilities, developmental delays, or intellectual or other health impairments, offering an alternative educational placement, often contracted through local school districts.

The program delivers individualized instruction tailored to each student's unique needs, incorporating evidence-based practices and a curriculum aligned with Illinois state learning standards. It emphasizes academic progress alongside development in social-emotional skills, communication, and functional life skills to promote independence and prepare students for successful reintegration into their home schools and communities.

A high staff-to-student ratio supports personalized learning in fully equipped classrooms and therapy rooms, enabling a nurturing environment that combines educational goals with Therapeutic supports. The academy focuses on helping students thrive academically and socially in a setting designed specifically for their success.

The Easterseals Learning Academy is located at 110 Fandal Road, Germantown Hills, Illinois.

=== Family and community resources ===
Easterseals Central Illinois offers a variety of resources to empower families caring for children with disabilities, developmental delays, or autism, along with initiatives to foster greater awareness and inclusion across the broader community.

A primary family resource is the Parent Handbook, which serves as a comprehensive guide to navigating the organization's services. It includes practical information, helpful tips, and answers to frequently asked questions to assist families throughout their experience.

The organization also provides a Resource Library containing tools, expert insights, and actionable strategies to support families, caregivers, and professionals in understanding and addressing the needs of children with disabilities.

To promote community inclusion, Easterseals Central Illinois continues to promote disability awareness in schools and communities through programs like the Ability Awareness Program and Coins4Kids.

== Timber Pointe Outdoor Center ==
=== History and establishment ===
Timber Pointe Outdoor Center originated as Camp Heffernan, a property originally owned and operated by the Boy Scouts of America along the shoreline of Lake Bloomington near Hudson, Illinois. Easteseals Central Illinois began providing camping experiences for children with disabilities in the early 1950s, utilizing the location for residential camps.

In 1989, Easterseals Central Illinois acquired the property from the Boy Scouts.

The facility was subsequently rebranded as Timber Pointe Outdoor Center and established as an inclusive outdoor recreation center, designed to offer specialized, adapted, and accessible programming to meet the needs of individuals with disabilities and their families.

=== Programs and activities ===
Timber Pointe Outdoor Center provides inclusive recreational programs and activities that enable children, youth, and families—with and without disabilities—to participate in outdoor adventures, build skills, and foster personal growth in a supportive environment.

The center offers summer day camps and overnight camps tailored for various age groups, including youth ages 5–17 for day programs with programming suited to developmental ages 5-13 and ages 7–17 for overnight sessions, as well as inclusive options welcoming participants with and without disabilities. Family retreats and weekend camps further extend these opportunities to families children with disabilities.

Campers engage in a diverse array of traditional outdoor activities adapted for all abilities, such as zip lining, fishing, boating, swimming, archery, horseback riding, target sports, arts and crafts, and music. These experiences encourage exploration, enthusiasm, and engagement while promoting inclusion through adaptive equipment and individualized support.

The programs emphasize skill-building, independence, and confidence, helping participants develop positive relationship, try new activities, and celebrate personal achievements. inclusive design ensures everyone can participate fully, creating opportunities for meaningful connections and lifelong skills.

=== Facilities and impact ===
Timber Pointe Outdoor Center, located on a 170-acre wooded site along Lake Bloomington just outside Hudson, Illinois, serves as Easterseals Central Illinois' premier facility for inclusive outdoor recreation and experiential programs.

The center features a wide range of accessible amenities designed to support specialized and adapted activities for individuals of all abilities, including those with disabilities. These include over eight kilometers of hiking trails, an equestrian arena, sports field, rock wall and zip line, giant swing, heated outdoor pool, basketball court, archery range, arts and crafts center, bonfire pits, and direct access to Lake Bloomington for boating, canoeing, and fishing. Cabins and lodges provide fully accessible overnight accommodations.

As a fully accessible camp, Timber Pointe enables children, adults, and families to engage with nature, build skills, make friends, and experience joy in a safe and inclusive environment. It empowers participants by promoting independence, self-esteem, social connections, and personal growth through meaningful outdoor experiences, helping create lasting memories and a sense of belonging.

== Locations ==
=== Service centers ===
Easterseals Central Illinois operates key service centers to deliver its specialized programs, with facilities focused on therapy, education, and recreation.

The Peoria Service Center, located at 507 E. Armstrong Ave., Peoria, IL 61603, functions as the organization's primary hub and headquarters. It offers a broad range of pediatric therapy services—including physical, occupational, speech, and feeding therapies—as well as autism–related supports such as diagnostic evaluations and Applied Behavior Analysis (ABA) therapy.

The Bloomington Service Center, at 202 St. Joseph Dr., Bloomington, IL 61701, provides comparable pediatric therapy and autism services to support families in the Bloomington-Normal region.

The Easterseals Learning Academy, situated at 110 Fandel Rd., Germantown Hills, IL 61548, is a non-public private school approved by the Illinois State Board of Education. It serves students aged 5 to 21 with primary diagnoses such as autism, emotional disabilities, developmental delays, or intellectual impairments, delivering individualized, evidence-based instruction aligned with state standards, therapeutic support, and focus on academic, social, communication, and functional life skills to promote independence and community transition.

Timber Pointe Outdoor Center, located at 20 Timber Pointe Lane, Hudson, IL 61748, serves as a specialized recreational facility owned and operated by Easterseals Central Illinois. It provides inclusive outdoor programs, including day camps, overnight summer and weekend camps, family retreats, and partner group activities, all adapted to empower children and adults with disabilities through experiential opportunities that build skills, confidence, and community inclusion.

=== Coverage area ===
Easterseals Central Illinois provides services to communities across Central Illinois, with a primary focus on the counties of McLean, Peoria, Tazewell, and Woodford.

The organization also manages Child and Family Connections (CFC) offices for early intervention, which coordinate services for children from birth to age three with developmental delays or disabilities. CFC #14, located in Peoria, serves Henry, Peoria, Stark, Tazewell, and Woodford counties, while CFC #16, located in Champaign, serves Champaign, Ford, Iroquois, Livingston, McLean, and Vermilion counties.

These CFC offices enable broader regional support across eleven Central Illinois counties through service coordination and family resources.

Service centers and programs are situated in key locations within these counties, including Peoria, Bloomington, Champaign, Germantown Hills, and Hudson.

== Impact ==
=== Client statistics and reach ===
Easterseals Central Illinois serves a substantial number of clients annually through its specialized programs for children and individuals with disabilities. In 2024, the organization provided pediatric therapy services to 1,019 clients, focusing on developmental support and physical medicine and rehabilitation.

Its early intervention program reached 2,506 clients in 2024, delivering critical services to young children and their families to address developmental delays.

The Timber Pointe Outdoor Center hosted 1,125 campers in 2024, offering inclusive recreational experiences and opportunities for personal growth.

Overall, Easterseals Central Illinois serves upwards of 7,800 families per year across its programs, contributing to thousands of lives touched annually in Central Illinois.

=== Community achievements and recognition ===
Eastereals Central Illinois has earned multiple accreditations and awards that underscore its commitment to excellence in pediatric rehabilitation, autism services, and community inclusion.

The organization maintains CARF International accreditation for its Interdisciplinary Outpatient Medical Rehabilitation Programs (Pediatric Specialty Program), marking its eighth consecutive three-year accreditation. This independent recognition confirms adherence to rigorous global standards for quality, safety and optimal outcomes, following comprehensive reviews including stakeholders interviews, observations, and documentation analysis. Easterseals Central Illinois is the only CARF-accredited program in this category in Central Illinois and one of just two with a pediatric specialty across the state.

In 2023, Easterseals Central Illinois received the Community Health Award from the University of Illinois College of Medicine Peoria, presented as a group winner during the institution's Celebration of Excellence. The award honors the organization's more than century-long service to children with disabilities and their families, highlighting its broad community support and creative initiatives, such as The Autism Collective for addressing critical needs and specialized inclusive camping experiences at Timber Pointe Outdoor Center.

The Bloomington Service Center has held accreditation from the Behavioral Health Center for Excellence (BHCOE) since 2021, with full status extending through January 2027. This accreditation reflects rigorous evaluation and compliance with BHCOE Standards of Excellence in Applied Behavior Analysis (ABA) therapy, affirming high-quality, evidence-based support for autistic individuals across center-based, home-based, school-based, and community-based settings.

Easterseals Central Illinois builds lasting impact through extensive community partnerships with healthcare providers, autism support organizations, and local institutions, including the University of Illinois College of Medicine at Peoria, OSF Healthcare, Children's Hospital of Illinois, Greater Peoria YMCA, Bloomington-Normal YMCA, Heart of Illinois United Way, and groups such as The Autism Program (TAP) and Central Illinois Autism Association. These collaborations extend resources, strengthen advocacy for accessibility and independence, and promote inclusive opportunities throughout Central Illinois.
