= Saskia Lettmaier =

Saskia Katharina Lettmaier (born 1979) is a German jurist trained in Anglo-American and German law. From 2016 until 2024, she was a professor of Private Law, European Legal History, Private International and Comparative Law at the University of Kiel where she also served as a director of the University's Hermann Kantorowicz Institute. Since December 2016, she has also served as a judge at the Higher Regional Court of Schleswig-Holstein, the highest court in civil and criminal matters in the German state of Schleswig-Holstein. Her research interests focus on the historical and comparative aspects of private law, especially family and inheritance law, and on the intersection between law and culture. In 2024, she transferred to the University of Hamburg, where she is currently a professor of Private Law and Global Legal History with a Focus on Common Law.

== Academic career ==
Lettmaier graduated from Harvard Law School earning a Doctor of Juridical Science (S.J.D.) degree, which is Harvard's most advanced law degree. She authored the book, Broken Engagements: The Action for Breach of Promise of Marriage and the Feminine Ideal, 1800–1940 (Oxford University Press, 2010), which "reviews the legal and cultural history of the action of breach of promise of marriage", and investigates the changes from 1800 to 1940.

=== Research on English marital law ===
Lettmaier's research has described the evolution and ultimate decline of breach of promise lawsuits in England, which allowed women to sue men for breaking a promise to enter into marriage. Lettmaier noted that these lawsuits were gendered as a "ladies' action" during the first half of the nineteenth century, and that traditionally high success rates in these lawsuits declined during the second half of the nineteenth century when the stereotype of "assertive" litigants conflicted with social norms that expected women to be "passive". Her research also indicated that in the late eighteenth century, the gravamen of these lawsuits shifted from claims of economic loss to claims of psychological or emotional harm, though she also rejected the characterization of breach of promise lawsuits as purely contractual disputes. Her latest research - Spouses, Church, and State: Marriage Law in England and Protestant Germany from the Reformation until the Close of the Nineteenth Century (Mohr Siebeck, 2025) - explores the shift from a unified marital order, legislated and adjudicated by a universal church and influenced by theological principles, to a non-unified marital order, legislated and adjudicated by separate and sovereign states and influenced by secular principles.
