= Endrew F. v. Douglas County School District RE–1 =

Endrew F. v. Douglas County School Dist. RE–1
- Supreme Court of the United States

Argued January 11, 2017 Decided March 22, 2017
- Full case name: Endrew F., a minor, by and through his parents and next friends, Joseph F. et al. v. Douglas County School District RE-1
- Docket no.: 15-827
- Citations: 580 U.S. 386 (more) 137 S. Ct. 988; 197 L. Ed. 2d 335

Case history
- Prior: Endrew F. v. Douglas County School District RE–1, 798 F.3d 1329 (10th Cir. 2015); Endrew F. v. Douglas County School District RE–1, No. 12-CV-02620-LTB (D. Colo. Sep. 15, 2014)
- Procedural: On Writ of Certiorari to the United States Court of Appeals for the Tenth Circuit

Holding
- To meet its substantive obligation under the IDEA, a school must offer an Individualized Education Program (IEP) reasonably calculated to enable a child to make progress appropriate in light of the child’s circumstances. United States Court of Appeals for the Tenth Circuit vacated and remanded.

Court membership
- Chief Justice John Roberts Associate Justices Anthony Kennedy · Clarence Thomas; Ruth Bader Ginsburg · Stephen Breyer; Samuel Alito · Sonia Sotomayor; Elena Kagan

Case opinion
- Majority: Roberts, joined by unanimous

Laws applied
- Individuals with Disabilities Education Act; 20 U.S.C. § 1400 et seq.

Endrew F. v. Douglas County School District RE–1, 580 U.S. 386 (2017), was a United States Supreme Court case that held that the Individuals with Disabilities Education Act ("IDEA"), required schools to provide students an education that is "reasonably calculated to enable a child to make progress appropriate in light of the child’s circumstances." In a unanimous opinion written by Chief Justice John Roberts, the Court vacated the judgment of the U.S. Court of Appeals for the Tenth Circuit.

The central issue in the case was about "the level of educational benefit school districts must provide students with disabilities as defined by IDEA." The Supreme Court held that the proper standard under the IDEA "is markedly more demanding than the 'merely more than de minimis' test applied by the Tenth Circuit." The Court added that meaningful, "appropriately ambitious" progress goes further than what the lower courts had held. The Court, however, rejected a stricter equal access or equal opportunity standard for a free and appropriate education proposed by the plaintiff. The case was described by advocates as "the most significant special-education issue to reach the high court in three decades."

== Case background ==
In 2010, Endrew, who was in Grade 5 at the time at Summit View Elementary school in Douglas County School District RE-1 in Colorado, began to exhibit "severe behavioral issues." The parents removed their child from Summit View and enrolled him in a specialized school for children with autism, Firefly Autism House in Denver, with an annual tuition of $70,000. The family requested reimbursement for the Firefly tuition claiming the Douglas County School District had not fulfilled the requirements of IDEA. On May 15, 2016, they lost their case before the United States Court of Appeals for the Tenth Circuit with circuit judges Harris Hartz, Timothy Tymkovich, and Gregory A. Phillips presiding. Their argument was that "the federal statute only requires that schools provide students with "some educational benefit."" In an amicus brief submitted by the Office of the Solicitor General, the Supreme Court was urged to take the case stating that the 10th U.S. Circuit Court of Appeals "had set the bar — a standard of 'merely … more than de minimis' educational benefit — too low."

Thus, for over 30 years, this Court has held that if a State provides a program 'reasonably calculated to enable the child to receive educational benefits,' then it 'has complied with the obligations imposed by Congress and the courts can require no more...No parent or educator in America would say that a child has received an 'appropriate' or a 'specially suitable' or 'proper' education 'in the circumstances' when all the child has received are benefits that are barely more than trivial."

— Amicus brief Office of the Solicitor General, August 18, 2016

== Supreme Court takes the case ==
In September 2016, the U.S. Supreme Court announced that it would hear the "potentially groundbreaking case" brought by a "Douglas County couple who claim that their autistic son was not provided an adequate education in the public school system as required by federal law." Access to public education through IDEA had been affirmed by the U.S. Supreme Court in 1982 in Board of Education v. Rowley, but the quality of guaranteed education for students with disabilities under IDEA had not been addressed. This Supreme Court case has the potential to "affect the education of 6.7 million children with disabilities" as the Court "struggles "to decide whether it should require public schools to do more under a federal law that calls for them to provide a free education that addresses the children's needs." In the Solicitor General's Amicus brief, the Supreme Court was advised that "Resolving the conflict among the circuits will ensure that millions of children with disabilities receive a consistent level of education, while providing parents and educators much-needed guidance regarding their rights and obligations."

On November 21, 2016, 118 lawmakers filed a bicameral amicus brief supporting the rights of students with disabilities to receive a "meaningful" public education. Since August 2016, National Education Association (NEA), the United States' largest trade union, former officials of the U.S. Department of Education, the National Disability Rights Network, the National Education Association, the Council of Parent Attorneys and Advocates, the National Center for Special Education in Charter Schools, and others have "submitted amicus briefs in support of the child."

== Supreme court argument ==
Supreme Court Justices Stephen G. Breyer, Samuel A. Alito Jr., and Anthony M. Kennedy expressed concerns about the implications of implementing IDEA with changes in quality of education standards. Breyer cautioned about potential rising costs of litigation, for example, extraneous lawsuits. Kennedy questioned the financial cost to districts with severely disabled students; Alito considered the burden on poorer school districts.

Not all of the eleven circuit courts have considered the issue of standards and in those that have, only two set "meaningful educational benefit" standard. The Supreme Court will decide whether a uniform standard should apply nationally. Alito expressed frustration with the "blizzard of words" produced in the last thirty years of appeals courts hearings which offered different views on standards.

Justice Ruth Bader Ginsburg cited the Board of Education v. Rowley (1982) 458 U.S. 176 (1982) in which the Court held that public schools were "not required by law to provide sign language interpreters to deaf students who are otherwise receiving an equal and adequate education."

The lawyer for the parents, Jeffrey L. Fisher, claimed that schools should provide "substantially equal educational opportunities" and in most cases, the costs involve "things like providing Braille textbooks, providing an iPad, providing some specialized instruction by a staff member who's already on staff...[T]here are going to be some extreme cases....[IDEA] does not permit cost to trump what the act otherwise requires. Schools should provide "a level of educational services designed to allow the child to progress from grade to grade in the general curriculum."

== Decision ==
In a unanimous decision written by Chief Justice John Roberts, the Supreme Court held that to meet its substantive obligation under IDEA, a school must offer "an IEP reasonably calculated to enable a child to make progress appropriate in light of the child's circumstances."

The Court rejected the Tenth Circuit's application of a "merely more than de minimis" standard, which required only that schools provide barely more than trivial educational benefit. The Court found this standard inconsistent with the statutory language and purpose of IDEA, emphasizing that the law requires more than minimal progress. However, the Court also rejected a standard requiring substantially equal opportunities to non-disabled peers, stating that IDEA does not "guarantee any particular level of education." Schools must provide an educational program that is "appropriately ambitious" for each student with an IEP.

== See also ==
- List of United States Supreme Court cases
- Lists of United States Supreme Court cases by volume
- List of United States Supreme Court cases by the Roberts Court
