= Arlington Central School District Board of Education v. Murphy =

- Supreme Court of the United States

Argued April 19, 2006 Decided June 26, 2006
- Full case name: Arlington Central School District Board of Education v. Pearl Murphy, et vir
- Docket no.: 05-18
- Citations: 548 U.S. 291 (more) 126 S. Ct. 2455; 165 L. Ed. 2d 526; 2006 U.S. LEXIS 5162

Case history
- Prior: Murphy v. Arlington Central School District Board of Education, 402 F.3d 332 (2d Cir. 2005); cert. granted, 546 U.S. 1085 (2006).

Court membership
- Chief Justice John Roberts Associate Justices John P. Stevens · Antonin Scalia; Anthony Kennedy · David Souter; Clarence Thomas · Ruth Bader Ginsburg; Stephen Breyer · Samuel Alito

Case opinions
- Majority: Alito, joined by Roberts, Scalia, Kennedy, Thomas
- Concurrence: Ginsburg
- Dissent: Souter
- Dissent: Breyer, joined by Stevens, Souter

Laws applied
- Individuals with Disabilities Education Act

Arlington Central School District Board of Education v. Murphy, 548 U.S. 291 (2006), was a United States Supreme Court case about experts' fees in cases commenced under the Individuals with Disabilities Education Act (IDEA). Justice Samuel Alito, writing for the majority, ruled that IDEA does not authorize the payment of the experts' fees of the prevailing parents. Justice Ruth Bader Ginsburg concurred in part, and in the judgment. Justices David Souter and Stephen Breyer filed dissents.

== Background ==
The respondents, Pearl and Theodore Murphy of LaGrange, New York, sued the petitioner, Arlington Central School District, seeking to require them to pay for their child's private school tuition under IDEA. The Murphys were successful, and the decision in their favor was upheld on appeal. The Murphys and their attorney, David Vladeck, then sued to require that the School District pay for the experts' fees incurred in the course of the trial.

The District Court held that part of the fees were covered under the law, and required the School District to pay them. The Second Circuit Court of Appeals affirmed, but acknowledged that other Circuits had ruled differently. The Supreme Court granted certiorari to resolve the differences between the circuits.

=== Issue ===
IDEA allows a court to "award reasonable attorneys' fees as a part of the costs." The issue to be decided was whether this includes experts' fees.

=== Parties' arguments ===
The School District said that the plain language of the statute should govern, i.e. that "attorneys' fees" means only those fees paid for an attorney's services. The Murphys argued that the word "costs" is more important, and that the plain meaning of "costs" includes the cost of hiring an expert witness.

== Opinion of the Court ==
Justice Alito, writing for the majority, ruled that the ability to award attorneys' fees does not include the ability to award experts' fees. "Costs," the Court wrote, is a term of art that generally does not include either type of fees. To add attorney's fees to costs is exceptional under American law, which is why it was written into the statute. That change of the court's power does not affect its power over experts' fees.

Furthermore, relying on previous cases, the Court said that without clear notice to the states, a statute cannot require that a certain fee shall be assessed against the state. In response to the Murphys' contention that the legislative history suggests that experts' fees should be included, the Court stated that because the statute's actual wording is unambiguous, there is no need to consult outside sources. In addition, the fact that the Act authorized a GAO study of the effect of awarding costs does not change the actual wording of the Act, which does not so award them.

=== Concurrence ===
Justice Ginsburg concurred in part with the decision and concurred in the judgment. She disagreed with the way the Court applied the "clear notice" requirement but found the rest of the ruling to be correct.

=== Dissents ===
==== Breyer's dissent ====
Justice Breyer dissented from the Court's ruling and was joined by Justices Stevens and Souter. Stating that the statute is not unambiguous and relying on the legislative history, Breyer wrote that the term "costs" was intended by Congress to include the cost of hiring expert witnesses. He also wrote that the "Act's basic purpose" dictates that the award of all costs, including experts' fees, be allowed. He rejected the application of the "clear notice" rule.

==== Souter's dissent ====
Although he had also joined Justice Breyer's dissent, Justice Souter dissented separately to write that certain GAO studies authorized by IDEA give weight to Breyer's arguments and distinguish this case from those the majority cites.

=== Theoretical Distinction ===
The majority opinion, written by Justice Alito, followed a textualist statutory interpretation. Textualist judges seek to locate "shared conventions" inherent within the statutory language, often turning to textual "canons of construction" that "reflect broader conventions of language use."

== Subsequent developments ==
In 2009, Congressmen Chris Van Hollen and Pete Sessions introduced the IDEA Fairness Restoration Act, to override Murphy and enable parents to recover their expert fees. The bill was reintroduced in 2011 by Senator Tom Harkin, Chair, Senate Health Education and Labor Committee, and Congressman Chris Van Hollen and Congressman Peter Sessions.
