= Council of Parent Attorneys and Advocates =

Independent national American association

The Council of Parent Attorneys and Advocates (COPAA) is an independent national American association of parents of children with disabilities, attorneys, advocates, and related professionals who protect the legal and civil rights of students with disabilities and their families. COPAA has a 22-member Board of Directors who run the organization. Board members are selected to be representative of diversity of COPAA's peer-to-peer network and have significant experience in various aspects of COPAA's work. Currently COPAA has more than 3400 members in all states, the District of Columbia and several territories. Over 90% of all of its members, including professionals, are people with disabilities or parents and family members of people with disabilities. COPAA accomplishes its mission largely through the work of its network of volunteers, who are supported by the staff of the organization.

COPAA was founded by S. James Rosenfeld in 1998 and is an independent 501(c)(3) non-profit organization.

== Mission and members ==
COPAA's mission is to help parents of children with disabilities so parents may collaborate as equal partners with school districts on their children's individualized education programs. Its members work wherever families and students need help and COPAA supports them with resources, training, and information to assist in obtaining the equal opportunity for education those children deserve and are entitled to under federal law. COPAA focuses on the rights of children who receive special education, and who are served under the Individuals with Disabilities Education Act (IDEA) and other federal and state statutes. This includes working to ensure that children with disabilities receive a Free Appropriate Public Education (FAPE).

COPAA endeavors to improve the quality and quantity of legal assistance for parents of children with disabilities. COPAA does not represent individual parents but provides a directory of special education attorneys and advocates; an online community to support networking and peer-to peer assistance; and provides training and informational webinars and roundtables to parents, advocates, attorneys, and related professionals. In its 20-year history, COPAA itself, had never before filed litigation on behalf of its members. It took that step for the first time in 2018 because it believed that federal and state agencies had abdicated responsibility to enforce the civil rights of students and their families.

Advocates are nonlawyer professionals who work with parents to advocate for appropriate educations for their children with disabilities.

COPAA works to:

- Enable parents to work more effectively with school personnel to plan and obtain effective educational programs for their children with disabilities;
- Encourage more attorneys and advocates to undertake representation of parents of children with disabilities in their efforts to plan and obtain effective educational programs;
- Provide advocate, attorney, parent and other professional COPAA members with the practical resources, training, and information they need to obtain appropriate and effective educational programs for students with disabilities;
- Provide an annual conference to train parents, advocates, and attorneys in advocacy and litigation techniques;
- Enable members to network and share information and legal resources.

(Membership in COPAA is not available to attorneys who represent, or individuals currently employed at greater than 50 of income by, education agencies receiving federal or state IDEA funds unless an exception is granted by the board of directors.) COPAA offers a national conference each year, topical webinars, and online training for advocates and new attorneys to further its mission of training attorneys, advocates, and parents.

== Lawsuits and lobbying ==
COPAA files amicus curiae briefs with the courts in cases of national significance. COPAA has filed amicus curiae briefs with the United States Supreme Court in filed in:

- Perez v. Sturgis Public Schools (2023) arguing in part that Congress understood that students suffered additional harms beyond being denied appropriate educational instruction. This led Congress to pass the Handicapped Children's Protection Act of 1986, Pub. L. No. 99-372 (HCPA), now codified in IDEA at 20 U.S.C. § 1415(l), to confirm and ensure that students with disabilities could also assert valid civil rights claims under Section 1983, Section 504, and, later, the ADA. COPAA successfully argued that Miguel sought relief not available under IDEA so not required to exhaust administrative remedies in order to bring non-IDEA civil rights claims.
- The groundbreaking case Endrew F. v. Douglas Cnty. Sch. Dist. (2017), arguing that a child “benefits from” instruction when the services target all areas of educational need in order to ensure achievement consistent with non-disabled peers in the general education curriculum so as to enable students to be prepared for post-school activities;
- Fry v. Napoleon Community Schools (2017); and
- Forest Grove School District. v. T.A. (2009).

The organization has also filed in numerous cases in the United States Courts of Appeal:

- Schaffer v. Weast (2005), arguing that school districts should bear the burden of proof in IDEA cases because of their greater resources;
- Winkelman v. Parma City School District (2006), arguing that pro se parents may represent themselves in IDEA cases in court; and
- Board of Education of New York v. Tom F. (2007), arguing that parents may seek tuition reimbursement under IDEA for a child who has been denied a free appropriate public education (FAPE) but who did not previously receive special education services from the school district.

COPAA also has filed in numerous cases in the United States Courts of Appeal.

COPAA is a voice in Congress regarding policy and legislation affecting the educational and civil rights of children with disabilities. For example, COPAA has advocated with states to override the Schaffer v. Weast decision and place the burden of proof on school districts, which the organization believes to be more equitable and fair. COPAA has also worked to support the IDEA Fairness Restoration Act, which would enable parents who prevail in IDEA cases to recover their expert witness fees. According to COPAA, few parents can afford the thousands of dollars needed to pay qualified medical, educational, and technical experts in IDEA cases.

== Publications ==
In 2008 COPAA published its Declaration of Principles Opposing the Use of Restraint, Seclusion and Aversive Interventions in Schools In 2009, COPAA published the Monograph, Unsafe in the Schoolhouse: Abuse of Children with Disabilities, written by Jessica Butler. It documents 180 incidents in which children in special education were subject to restraints, seclusion, and other abusive interventions. Ms. Butler's Monograph also makes recommendations to Congress to adopt legislation that will protect children with disabilities from abusive practices. Unsafe in the Schoolhouse was one of two reports included by the Government Accountability Office (GAO) in its national report on restraint and seclusion. Unsafe in the Schoolhouse was also cited by the national media, including National Public Radio, and Education News. In 2008, COPAA had issued a Declaration of Principals Opposing the Use of Restraint, Seclusion, and Abuse of Children with Disabilities. The Declaration expresses the view the use of restraints, seclusion and aversive interventions as part of educational programs for children with disabilities.

In 2012 COPAA was among the first to analyze participation of students with disabilities in charter schools with the publication of "Charter Schools and Students with Disabilities" In follow-up COPAA served as the primary investigators under cooperative agreement with the National Council on Disability (2018) School Choice Series: Charter Schools and Implications for Students with Disabilities

COPAA was again in the forefront of an important issue in publishing the report "School Vouchers and Students with Disabilities: Examining Impact in the Name of Choice" in 2016, showing the variance in state programs and cautioning of harms to students and their families when they are forced to relinquish rights. In follow-up COPAA served as the primary investigators under cooperative agreement with the National Council on Disability (2018) School Choice Series: "Choice and Voucher Programs: Implications for Students with Disabilities."

Furthermore, COPAA provides a variety of tools on its website, including a comparison of IDEA 2004 and IDEA '97.
