= Related services under IDEA =

Related services is defined by the United States Individuals with Disabilities Education Act ("IDEA") 1997 as,

"transportation and such developmental, corrective, and other supportive services as are required to assist a child with a disability to benefit from special education..."[section 300.24(a)].

Students who need special education and specially designed instruction are eligible for related serves under IDEA. During the evaluation process the student is evaluated to first find out if the student has a disability, and secondly to determine what types of related services the student requires. Within IDEA it can be in many forms.

The related services include: audiology, counseling services, early identification, family training-counseling and home visits, health services, medical services, nursing services, nutrition services, occupational therapy, orientation and mobility services, parent counseling and training, physical therapy, psychological services, recreation and therapeutic recreation, rehabilitative counseling services, interpretation services, school health services, service coordination services, social work services in schools, speech pathology and speech-language pathology, transportation and related costs, and assistive technology and services. Related services were mandated in the IDEA 1997, and more than 6.1 million children with disabilities received related services in 1998-1999 (Nichcy).

Children with exceptionalities depend on related services in their individualized education programs. The related services according to IDEA, "...assist a child with a disability to benefit from special education" [section 300.24(a)]. Related services also help children with exceptionalities to reach their IEP goals and objectives. In fact, in the IEP the related services section is located directly after the goals and objectives section. The IEP requires the document constructor to list the service provided, the location that the service will be provided in, the frequency that the service will be provided, the projected beginning date of the service, and the anticipated duration of the service. In order to make sure that this section of the IEP is written correctly is it essential that the service provider of the particular service either attend the IEP meeting, or send a written document describing the details of the service that will be provided.
