= Board of Education of the Hendrick Hudson Central School District v. Rowley =

Hendrick Hudson Central School District v. Rowley
- Supreme Court of the United States

Argued March 23, 1982 Decided June 29, 1982
- Full case name: Board of Education of the Hendrick Hudson Central School District, Westchester County, et al., Petitioners v. Amy Rowley, by her parents, Rowley et al., Respondent
- Docket no.: 80–1002
- Citations: 458 U.S. 176 (more) 102 S. Ct. 3034; 73 L. Ed. 2d 690
- Argument: Oral argument

Case history
- Prior: Rowley v. Bd. of Ed. of Hendrick Hudson Cent. School District, 483 F. Supp. 528 (S.D.N.Y. 1980); affirmed, 632 F.2d 945 (2d Cir. 1980).

Holding
- The Education of All Handicapped Children Act of 1975 does not require public schools to provide sign language interpreters to deaf students who are otherwise receiving an equal and adequate education.

Court membership
- Chief Justice Warren E. Burger Associate Justices William J. Brennan Jr. · Byron White; Thurgood Marshall · Harry Blackmun; Lewis F. Powell Jr. · William Rehnquist; John P. Stevens · Sandra Day O'Connor

Case opinions
- Majority: Rehnquist, joined by Burger, Powell, Stevens, O'Connor
- Concurrence: Blackmun
- Dissent: White, joined by Brennan, Marshall

Laws applied
- Education for All Handicapped Children Act

Board of Education of the Hendrick Hudson Central School District v. Rowley, 458 U.S. 176 (1982), is a United States Supreme Court case concerning the interpretation of the Education for All Handicapped Children Act of 1975. Amy Rowley was a deaf student, whose school refused to provide a sign language interpreter. Her parents filed suit contending violation of the Education for All Handicapped Children Act of 1975. In a 6–3 decision authored by Justice Rehnquist, the Court held that public schools are not required by law to provide sign language interpreters to deaf students who are otherwise receiving an equal and adequate education.

== Background ==
In the early 1970s, a series of Federal District Court cases – namely Pennsylvania Association for Retarded Children (PARC) v. Commonwealth of Pennsylvania (1971) and Mills v. Board of Education of District of Columbia (1972) – found a right to education for children with disabilities on the basis of due process and equal protection. A 1974 investigation by Congress found that more than 1.75 million children with disabilities received no public education and that another 3 million who did attend school did not receive education services appropriate to their needs. In 1975 Congress passed and President Ford signed into law the Education for All Handicapped Children Act (EAHCA). The act mandated that all children with disabilities receive a "free appropriate public education." To achieve this goal, the act required the student, parents and teachers together devise an Individualized Education Program (IEP), however the act did not specify that those IEPs include any particular services, standards or outcomes.

In 1976, respondents Clifford and Nancy Rowley met with the principal of Furnace Woods Elementary School in the Hendrick Hudson Central School District of Montrose, New York to discuss accommodations for their hearing-impaired daughter, Amy Rowley, who would be starting kindergarten there the following year. After having placed her in a regular kindergarten class on a trial basis, Amy was provided with an FM hearing aid and completed her kindergarten year, advancing on to first grade. In accordance with the Education for All Handicapped Children Act, an IEP was created for Amy which included the continued use of her FM hearing aid, but did not include a sign language interpreter. The school, in consultation with the school district's Committee on the Handicapped, contended that Amy did not need an interpreter. Her parents disagreed with that finding and received a hearing with an independent examiner. The examiner concluded that "Amy was achieving educationally, academically, and socially without such assistance." After losing their appeal to the New York Commissioner of Education, the Rowleys brought suit in the United States District Court for the Southern District of New York contending that denial of a sign language interpreter violated the EAHCA's guarantee of a free appropriate public education.

=== Lower courts ===
The case was heard before District Court Judge Vincent L. Broderick in late September 1979. At the evidentiary hearing, the Rowleys presented evidence that showed Amy, despite her academic success so far, was not able to fully achieve in the classroom with the resources available. They provided test results showing that Amy understood only about 60 percent of discussion in the classroom, while an interpreter would put her closer to 100%. They further provided results from two academic achievement tests Amy took in first grade, one administered in English and the other in American Sign Language. She had average performance on the test administered in English, but performed "well above average" on the test administered in American Sign Language. Based upon this evidence, Judge Broderick determined that even with the existing accommodations, Amy was not achieving her full potential.

Because of his determination that Amy would be more successful with an interpreter, Judge Broderick ruled that failure to provide her with one violated the Education for All Handicapped Children Act. He stated that "The Act itself does not define 'appropriate education'" nor had a common law interpretation arisen. The requirements of the act, Judge Broderick argued, fell somewhere between a simply "adequate" education and one that allows the student to achieve their full potential, neither extreme being possible. Based on the testimony of Dr. Zavarella, Amy's principal, who said that the district would only provide an interpreter if Amy proved to be failing academically, Judge Broderick determined that the defendants were merely providing an adequate education but not an appropriate education. The New York Commissioner of Education was overruled and the defendants were ordered to provide Amy a sign language interpreter.

Hendrick Hudson School District and the Commissioner of Education appealed the decision to the United States Court of Appeals for the Second Circuit. The three judge panel issued a per curiam decision affirming the district court's judgement. Circuit Judge Mansfield dissented from the opinion, arguing that the act did in fact define an "appropriate education", that deference should have been given to educational authorities on educational matters, and that certain affidavits admitted into evidence and used in the basis of the decision constituted impermissible hearsay. The Board appealed again and the Supreme Court granted certiorari.

== Supreme Court ==
The Supreme Court heard oral arguments on 23 March 1982. Raymond G. Kuntz, advocate for the petitioners, argued that the Education for All Handicapped Children Act did not require the provision of any specific services, but rather is a funding statute saying "the Act could have described specific services and it did not." The Justices questioned him as to the "full potential" standard laid out in the lower court rulings, particularly whether a sign language interpreter would be required to meet such a standard. Kuntz argued that the "full potential" standard could be satisfied without a sign language interpreter, but maintained that the standard was erroneous. Such a standard, petitioners contended, was "not a requirement that can be fulfilled by any school district" and criticized the District Court ruling as creating "unworkable" tests that could not be adequately applied in practice. Kuntz also raised the argument that determinations of educational services and content were, constitutionally, matters delegated to the states.

Beginning of Michael A. Chatoff's oral arguments
Michael A. Chatoff was the first deaf person to argue before the Supreme Court.

Michael A. Chatoff, a deaf lawyer, represented the Rowleys. Although deaf, Chatoff was able to speak and delivered his arguments orally in English while he was able to respond to justices' questions using a computer-aided transcription system involving a stenographer and a computer monitor supplied by Gallaudet University and Translation Systems, Inc. The equipment had to be specially approved by the Court, and it was the first time the Court approved the use of such electronic equipment and the first time a deaf person argued before the Supreme Court.

Chatoff argued that "the goal of the act is to provide handicapped children with equal educational opportunities." Asked to justify that interpretation, Chatoff pointed to the legislative record arguing it was the intent of the legislation rather than the text of the statute specifically. The justices also questioned him about the implications of upholding such an interpretation, specifically "will your interpretation of the statute require every school board to provide a sign language interpreter for every deaf child in the country?" Chatoff argued that the case was specific to Amy and distinguished between what Amy needed and what other students similarly situated may or may not need: "The deaf community is not a monolithic entity....Not every deaf child can be educated in the public school....Children who are educated in special schools or in research rooms have no need for interpreters. Children raised using the oral method have no need for interpreters. It will be only very specific instances."

Arguing on behalf of the United States in support of the respondents, Elliot Schulder focused largely on matters of statutory interpretation rather than specific outcomes for Amy. When pressed by the justices regarding the educational standards required, he contended that the district court opinion went too far: "the emphasis is not on potential or shortfall from potential, but on the making available to handicapped children the same opportunities that are available to non-handicapped children to benefit from the regular educational program that the state or local school authorities provide." The justices brought up an issue Kuntz, for the petitioner, touched on: "what's this court supposed to do? Independently make its own judgment or ... [say] all I'm allowed to do is to decide whether the school acted arbitrarily?" Essentially, should the court rule on whether aspects of the individual education program allow a disabled child to reach their full potential or is the approval of an individual education program sufficient to satisfy the act. Schulder argues a middle ground: "We don't think the court has to measure potential, but we do believe that the court has to make an independent determination whether, in this particular case, for example, the plan as developed provides the child in question access to the same educational opportunity available to non-handicapped children."

On rebuttal, Kuntz argued against the district court's contention that Amy only understands 59% of what occurs in the classroom. He contended that their evidence was more persuasive to show that Amy was understanding everything without a sign language interpreter. The district court based its finding on a word discrimination test conducted outside the classroom. Their experts, who observed Amy in the classroom, had determined "Amy understands nearly all of what transpires in her classroom."

=== Opinion of the Court ===
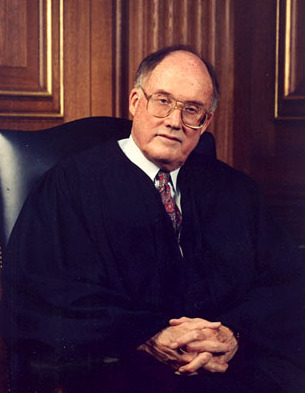
Justice William Rehnquist wrote for the majority.

On June 28, 1982, the Court handed down a 6–3 decision in favor of the petitioners. Justice William Rehnquist wrote for the majority, with Justice Byron White writing the principal dissent joined by Justices William Brennan Jr. and Thurgood Marshall. The Court answered two questions: "what is meant by the act's requirement of a 'free appropriate public education'? And what is the role of state and federal courts in exercising the review granted by 20 U.S.C. § 1415?"

The Court held that both District and Appeals Courts were wrong in their contention that the intent of the law was to provide for disabled children's full potentials but rather to simply give them access. They specifically overruled the District Court's finding that "The act itself does not define 'appropriate education'", with Justice Rehnquist quoting the text of the statute itself: "The term 'free appropriate public education' means special education and related services" followed by further definitions of those terms. Instead, the text of the legislation and the legislative intent show that the purpose of the law was not to allow each child to achieve their full potential, but to simply provide sufficient resources for disabled children to access education. Rehnquist pointed to the text of the act creating a prioritization of how resources are to be allocated: "States receiving money under the act must provide education to the handicapped by priority, first "to handicapped children who are not receiving an education" and second "to handicapped children ... with the most severe handicaps who are receiving an inadequate education." In his concurrence, Justice Blackmun disagreed with the majority's finding of legislative intent, quoting his previous concurrence in Pennhurst State School v. Halderman: "it seems plain to me that Congress, in enacting this statute, intended to do more than merely set out politically self-serving but essentially meaningless language about what the handicapped deserve at the hands of state authorities." He agreed with the final judgement of the Court, however, as he, like the majority, believed the District Court should not have prescribed its own remedy but "should have given greater deference than they did to the findings of the School District's impartial hearing officer and the State's Commissioner of Education".

They next tackled the question of the role of the Courts in the judicial review process. Under the act, parents are provided a civil cause of action in courts when other administrative appeals are exhausted. The Court rejected the petitioners' contention that this right to judicial review only applied to procedural review of the administrative appeals and whether the decision was based on sufficient evidence. However they likewise stopped short of the de novo review that the Rowleys had advocated for which would allow the courts to prescribe particular educational methods like the District Court had. Rather, the majority held that a court must assess two question: "First, has the State complied with the procedures set forth in the act? And second, is the individualized educational program developed through the act's procedures reasonably calculated to enable the child to receive educational benefits? If these requirements are met, the State has complied with the obligations imposed by Congress, and the courts can require no more." Quoting San Antonio Independent School District v. Rodriguez, the Court reiterated that the judicial branch lacks the expertise "to resolve persistent and difficult questions of educational policy."

== Subsequent developments ==
Since the Supreme Court made its ruling on the basis of a statute (the EAHCA), not the Constitution, the precedent is only controlling so long as the relevant language of the law remains in effect. There is significant debate today over whether the standard enunciated in Board of Education v. Rowley has been superseded by such legislative changes. Amendments to IDEA during the 1997 and 2004 reauthorizations, the No Child Left Behind Act of 2002 and Common Core all include standards that potentially replace the judiciary standard. In J.L. and M.L., and their minor daughter, K.L. v. Mercer Island School District (2006), U.S. District Court Judge Marsha J. Pechman wrote that the IDEA reauthorization of 1997 represents "such a significant departure from the previous legislative scheme that any citation to pre-1997 case law on special education is suspect," though Judge Pechman's decision was overturned by the Ninth Circuit Court of Appeals in 2010.

The Rowleys had already decided to move to New Jersey and one year after losing the Supreme Court case did so. Rowley stated decades later that when the school district found out they were moving, they put a lien on the house to recover their costs in litigation. In New Jersey, Amy was enrolled in a day school for the deaf where deaf students were mainstreamed. She completed a PhD. in Second Language Education at the University of Wisconsin, Milwaukee in 2014 and is presently Associate Professor and Coordinator of the American Sign Language Program in the Modern Languages and Literatures Department at California State University, East Bay.

In 2004 the Rowley family donated their papers pertaining to the case to Syracuse University Library.

== Commentary and analysis ==
Board of Education v. Rowley is the most significant court case concerning the interpretation of the Individuals with Disabilities Education Act. It was the only occasion the U.S. Supreme Court has ruled on the requirement of public schools to provide an appropriate education to students with disabilities until Endrew F. v. Douglas County School Dist. RE–1 was decided in 2017. It is estimated that it has been cited by at least 3,279 cases. In a 2008 article published in the Journal of Law and Education, Julie F. Mead and Mark A. Paige described Rowley as "the primary precedent whenever the educational rights of children with disabilities are considered." Likewise, in a 2012 article, Mark C. Weber wrote that Rowley "remains the most important American special education case ever decided." Joyce O. Eckrem and Eliza J. McArthur stated in 2001 that Rowley has been described as a "seminal case", though they also recognized that the case did not "provide clarity on the issue of appropriateness" and that the Court only "cryptically addressed" the question of how to measure benefits for students. In a 2005 article published in the Suffolk University Law Review, Lester Aron also noted that circuit courts of appeal have issued conflicted rulings when interpreting Rowley.

Several scholars, including Elizabeth Drake, Scott F. Johnson and Maureen A. MacFarlane, have observed that some courts have moved away from Rowley's "some educational benefit" standard and have instead adopted a heightened "meaningful educational benefit" standard. Some commentators, such as Charlene K. Quade, argue that this "expanded reading" of Rowley reflects "sound" policy. Similarly, Scott F. Johnson has argued that the "some educational benefit" standard should be disfavored because it leads to "a system where schools do not necessarily have to do what is best for the child", though Johnson recommends pursuing legislative revisions rather than further reinterpretations of Rowley. On the other hand, some commentators, such as Terry Jean Seligmann, have argued that courts interpreting Rowley should give "due weight" to administrative determinations made by school boards and that courts should generally defer to the judgment of these administrators.

== See also ==
- Education for All Handicapped Children Act
- Individuals with Disabilities Education Act
- Free Appropriate Public Education
- Individualized Education Program
- Least restrictive environment

=== Select subsequent case law effecting Rowley ===
- Polk v. Central Susquehana Intermediate Unit 16 (1988)
- Cypress-Fairbanks Independent School District v. Michael F. (1997)
- Endrew F. v. Douglas County School District (2017)

== Bibliography ==
=== Court documents ===
- Amy Rowley, by her parents and natural guardians, Clifford and Nancy Rowley, and Clifford and Nancy Rowley, in their own right, Plaintiffs, v. The Board of Education of the Hendrick Hudson Central School District, Westchester County, and the Commissioner of Education of the State of New York, Defendants, 483 F. Supp. 528 (U.S. District Court for the Southern District of New York January 15, 1980).

=== Secondary sources ===
- "Enforcing the Right to an "Appropriate" Education: The Education for All Handicapped Children Act of 1975". Harvard Law Review. 92 (5). Harvard Law Review Association: 1103–1127. March 1979. doi:10.2307/1340453. JSTOR 1340453.
- James, Paul F. (Fall 1983). "The Education For All Handicapped Children Act of 1975: What's Left After Rowley". Willamette Law Review. 19 (4). Willamette University, College of Law: 715–736.
- Kaufmann, Andrea Kayne; Blewett, Evan (January 2012). "When Good Enough Is No Longer Good Enough: How the High Stakes Nature of the No Child Left Behind Act Supplanted the Rowley Definition of a Free Appropriate Public Education". Journal of Law and Education. 41 (1). University of South Carolina Law Center: 5–23.
- Kleiman, Dena (March 24, 1982). "First Deaf Lawyer Goes Before Supreme Court". The New York Times. New York.
- Lanear, John A.; Frattura, Elise M. (July 2008). "Prologue—Rowley Reconsidered: Revisiting Special Education's Landmark Case after 25 Years". Journal of Law and Education. 37 (3). University of South Carolina Law Center: 307–310.
- MacFarlane, Maureen A. (January 2012). "The Shifting Floor of Educational Opportunity: The Impact of Educational Reform on Rowley". Journal of Law and Education. 41 (1). University of South Carolina Law Center: 45–69.
- Mead, Julie F.; Paige, Mark A. (July 2008). "Board of Education of Hendrick Hudson v. Rowley: An Examination of its Precedential Impact". Journal of Law and Education. 37 (3). University of South Carolina Law Center: 329–345.
- Ravel, Judith A. (Fall 1983). "Board of Education v. Rowley: Landmark Roadblock or Another Signpost on the Road to State Courts". Connecticut Law Review. 16 (1). University of Connecticut, School of Law: 149–177.
- Rowley, Amy June (July 2008). "Rowley Reconsidered: A Persona Narrative". Journal of Law and Education. 37 (3). University of South Carolina Law Center: 311–328.
- Seligmann, Terry Jean (January 2012). "Sliding Doors: The Rowley Decision, Interpretation of Special Education Law, and What Might Have Been". Journal of Law and Education. 41 (1). University of South Carolina Law Center: 71–94.
- Smith, Dorothy (Spring 1989). "Communication in the Courtroom: Technology is Helping to Provide Equal Access to the Law" (PDF). Gallaudet Today. Gallaudet University: 19–21. Archived from the original (PDF) on March 4, 2016.
- Smith, R.C. (1996). A Case About Amy. Philadelphia, Penn.: Temple University Press. ISBN 1-56639-411-2.
- Tucker, Bonnie Poitras (April 1983). "Board of Education of the Hendrick Hudson Central School District v. Rowley: Utter Chaos". Journal of Law and Education. 12 (2). University of South Carolina Law Center: 235–245.
- Weber, Mark C. (January 2012). "Forward: Board of Education v. Rowley After Thirty Years". Journal of Law and Education. 41 (1). University of South Carolina Law Center: 1–4.
- Wright, Peter W. D.; Wright, Pamela (January 22, 2007). "Rebutting Rowley? Independence and Self-Sufficiency Are New Standards for FAPE". Wrightslaw.
- Yell, Mitchell L.; Katsiyannis, Antonis; Hazelkorn, Michael (May 2007). "Reflections on the 25th Anniversary of the U.S. Supreme Court's Decision in Board of Education v. Rowley" (PDF). Focus on Exceptional Children. 39 (9). Denver, Colo.: Love Publishing Company: 1–12. doi:10.17161/foec.v39i9.6876. Archived from the original (PDF) on 1 October 2015.
