= Winkelman v. Parma City School District =

- Supreme Court of the United States

Argued February 27, 2007 Decided May 21, 2007
- Full case name: Jacob Winkelman, a Minor, By and Through His Parents and Legal Guardians, Jeff and Sandee Winkelman, et al., Petitioners v. Parma City School District
- Citations: 550 U.S. 516 (more) 127 S. Ct. 1994; 167 L. Ed. 2d 904; 2007 U.S. LEXIS 5902; 75 U.S.L.W. 4329; 20 Fla. L. Weekly Fed. S 287

Case history
- Prior: Judgment for Defendants, N.D. Ohio; appeal dismissed, No. 05–3886, 6th Cir., Nov. 4, 2005; cert. granted, 549 U.S. ___ (2006)

Holding
- Parents can file suits under IDEA pro se because they are vindicating parental rights, rather than simply enforcing the rights of their children.

Court membership
- Chief Justice John Roberts Associate Justices John P. Stevens · Antonin Scalia; Anthony Kennedy · David Souter; Clarence Thomas · Ruth Bader Ginsburg; Stephen Breyer · Samuel Alito

Case opinions
- Majority: Kennedy, joined by Roberts, Stevens, Souter, Ginsburg, Breyer, Alito
- Concur/dissent: Scalia, joined by Thomas

Laws applied
- 20 U.S.C. § 1400(d)(1)(A); Individuals with Disabilities Education Act

Winkelman v. Parma City School District, 550 U.S. 516 (2007), is a civil suit under the Individuals with Disabilities Education Act decided by the Supreme Court of the United States. Justice Kennedy held for the seven-justice majority that parents may file suit under IDEA pro se. Justice Kennedy declined to reach the question whether parents may represent the interests of their children pro se, instead concluding that IDEA created a set of independently enforceable rights in parents.
