= IDEA Fairness Restoration Act =

The IDEA Fairness Restoration Act is an American legislative proposal first introduced in the United States House of Representatives on November 14, 2007, as H.R.4188. The bill was most recently reintroduced on March 17, 2011, in the Senate as S.613 and in the House as H.R. 1208 The primary sponsors are Senator Tom Harkin (D-IA), Chair of the Senate Health Education Labor and Pensions Committee, Congressmen Chris Van Hollen (D-CT), and Congressman Pete Sessions (R-TX). The bill would enable parents of children with disabilities to recover their expert witness fees in due process hearings under the Individuals with Disabilities Education Act (IDEA).

== Background ==
When a school district fails its legal obligations to students with disabilities, the Individuals with Disabilities Education Act permits the parent to seek a hearing before an impartial hearing officer. A school district may also request a due process hearing against parents. Hearings are rare. Only 5 in 10,000 students seek a hearing.

Expert witnesses have a critical role at due process hearings. They provide the technical expertise about the student’s disability and the care and educational services the student needs in the classroom.

In 1986, Congress passed the Handicapped Children’s Protection Act, allowing parents who prevail in due process hearings and litigation under the IDEA to recover their legal fees and costs. The language was modeled on similar provisions in the Civil Rights Act of 1964 (42 U.S.C. 2000e-5k). Congress’ Joint Conference Committee Report explained that the courts would have discretion to award attorneys’ fees as part of the costs of litigation. It noted that “The conferees intend that the term ‘attorneys’ fees as part of the costs’ include reasonable expenses and fees of expert witnesses and the reasonable costs of any test or evaluation which is found to be necessary for the preparation of the parent or guardian’s case in the action or proceeding.” The statute also directed the GAO to study the costs to parents, including costs of “attorneys and consultants” in IDEA proceedings.

In 2006, however, the Supreme Court decided the case of Arlington Central School Dist. Bd. of Ed. v. Murphy. The Court ruled that because the statutory text of the IDEA did not explicitly state that expert witness fees were covered, parents could not recover them. The Court reasoned that because the IDEA was enacted under the Spending Clause of the Constitution, Article I, Section 8, the law must “unambiguously” give notice in its statutory text that parents could recover fees. This meant Congress had to declare in the body of the statute that parents could recover expert witness fees. The IDEA Fairness Restoration Act will amend the statutory text of the IDEA to permit recovery of expert witness fees. Until Congress does, parents must pay their own expert witness fee expenses, even when they prevail.

== Description of the Bill ==
The IDEA permits parents who prevail in IDEA cases to recover reasonable attorneys’ fees. The IDEA Fairness Restoration Act will enable them to also recover the reasonable costs of expert witnesses. It will amend Section 615(i)(3) of the IDEA by adding the following at the end, “Inclusion of expert witness fees and other expenses as attorneys' fees. In this paragraph, the term ‘attorneys' fees’ shall include the fees of expert witnesses, including the reasonable costs of any test or evaluation necessary for the preparation of the parent or guardian's case in the action or proceeding.” Parents can recover expert witness fees only when they prevail, and the school system has been found, after an impartial hearing, to have wrongfully denied a child an appropriate education as defined in IDEA. fees. Parents cannot recover fees if they do not prevail.

The bill will align the IDEA with other civil rights statutes that permit recovery of expert witness fees, including Title VII, and the Americans with Disabilities Act of 1990. Several federal laws permit recovery of expert witness fees, including the Voting Rights Act of 1965, the Consumer Product Safety Act, the Toxic Substances Control Act, the Petroleum Marketing Practices Act, the Telemarketing and Consumer Fraud Abuse and Prevention Act, the Endangered Species Act, the Patent and Copyright Acts, the PROTECT Act, the Congressional Accountability Act of 1995, the Presidential and Executive Office Accountability Act, and the Whistleblower Protections for Contractor Employees of Department of Defense, Coast Guard, and National Aeronautics and Space Administration Act.

== Statement of Senator Harkin on introduction ==
When Senator Harkin introduced the bill, he explained the reasons for enactment. He said, “This critical legislation will remove the financial barrier that families, especially low- and middle-income families, face as they pursue their children's rights to the free, appropriate public education they deserve and are entitled to under the Fourteenth Amendment...There are . . .times when schools have not fulfilled their responsibilities to provide an appropriate education. In these cases, IDEA provides parents the right to challenge the schools through mediation and due process. To make their argument, families often need access to expert witnesses who can assess the student's needs and testify about whether the current IEP meets those needs. These expert witnesses are a resource that many families cannot afford, but without access to them, families may be unable to make their case. ” A 2002 study found that more than 1/3 of children with disabilities lived in households with incomes of $25,000 or less, compared to 24% of the general population, and 2/3 of children with disabilities lived in families that earned less than $50,000 a year.

== Legislative history ==
Congress	Short title	Bill number(s)	Date introduced	Sponsor(s)	# of cosponsors	Latest status
110th Congress	IDEA Fairness Restoration Act	H.R. 4188	November 14, 2007	Chris Van Hollen (D-MD)	42	Died in committee
111th Congress	IDEA Fairness Restoration Act	H.R. 2740	June 4, 2009	Chris Van Hollen (D-MD)	25	Died in committee
112th Congress	IDEA Fairness Restoration Act	H.R. 1208	March 17, 2011	Chris Van Hollen (D-MD)	18	Died in committee
112th Congress	IDEA Fairness Restoration Act	S. 613	March 17, 2011	Tom Harkin (D-IA)	7	Died in committee
113th Congress	IDEA Fairness Restoration Act	S. 2790	September 10, 2014	Tom Harkin (D-IA)	1	Died in committee

The IDEA Fairness Restoration Act was first introduced the House of Representatives in 2007 by Congressman Van Hollen and Congressman Sessions. The bill was introduced again in 2009. The bill was most recently re-introduced on March 17, 2011, in both the House and Senate as S.613 and H.R. 1208.
