= Individuals with Disabilities Education Act =

United States law

- Long title: Individuals with Disabilities Education Act
- Acronyms (colloquial): IDEA
- Enacted by: the 101st United States Congress

Citations
- Public law: Pub.L. 101-476
- Statutes at Large: 104 Stat. 1142

Codification
- Acts amended: Education for All Handicapped Children Act
- Titles amended: 20 U.S.C.: Education
- U.S.C. sections amended: 20 U.S.C. ch. 33, subch. I § 1400 et seq.

Legislative history
- Introduced in the Senate as S.1824 by Tom Harkin (D–IA) on October 31, 1989; Committee consideration by Committee on Labor and Human Resources; Passed the Senate on November 16, 1989 (voice vote); Passed the House on June 18, 1990 (without objection); Reported by the joint conference committee on October 1, 1990; agreed to by the Senate on October 2, 1990 (voice vote) and by the House on October 15, 1990 (voice vote); Signed into law by President George H. W. Bush on October 30, 1990

Major amendments
- No Child Left Behind Act; Individuals with Disabilities Education Improvement Act of 2004, P.L. 108-446

United States Supreme Court cases
- Zobrest v. Catalina Foothills School District, 509 U.S. 1 (1993); Florence County School Dist. Four v. Carter, 510 U.S. 7 (1993); Board of Education of Kiryas Joel Village School District v. Grumet, 512 U.S. 687 (1994); Agostini v. Felton, 521 U.S. 203 (1997); Cedar Rapids Community School District v. Garret F., 526 U.S. 66 (1999); Schaffer v. Weast, 546 U.S. 49 (2005); Arlington Central School Dist. Bd. of Ed. v. Murphy, 548 U.S. 291 (2006); Winkelman v. Parma City School Dist., 550 U.S. 516 (2007); New York City Board of Education v. Tom F., 552 U.S. 1 (2007); Forest Grove School Dist. v. T.A., 557 U.S. 230 (2009); Fry v. Napoleon Community Schools, No. 15-497, 580 U.S. ___ (2017); Endrew F. v. Douglas County School Dist. RE–1, No. 15-827, 580 U.S. ___ (2017); Luna Perez v. Sturgis Public Schools, No. 21-887, 598 U.S. ___ (2023)

The Individuals with Disabilities Education Act (IDEA) is a piece of American federal legislation that requires that students with a disability be provided with a Free Appropriate Public Education (FAPE) that is tailored to their individual needs. IDEA was known as the Education for All Handicapped Children Act (EHA) from 1975 to 1990. In 1990, the United States Congress reauthorized EHA and changed the title to IDEA. Overall, the goal of IDEA is to provide children with disabilities the same opportunity for education as those students who do not have a disability.

IDEA is composed of four parts, the main two being part A and part B. Part A covers the general provisions of the law; Part B covers assistance for education of all children with disabilities; Part C covers infants and toddlers with disabilities, including children from birth to age three; and Part D consists of the national support programs administered at the federal level. Each part of the law has remained largely the same since the original enactment in 1975.

In practice, IDEA is composed of six main elements that illuminate its main points. These six elements are: Individualized Education Program (IEP); Free and Appropriate Public Education (FAPE); Least Restrictive Environment (LRE); Appropriate Evaluation; Parent and Teacher Participation; and Procedural Safeguards. To go along with those six main elements, there are also a few other important components that tie into IDEA: Confidentiality of Information, Transition Services, and Discipline. Throughout the years of IDEA's being reauthorized, these components have become key concepts when learning about IDEA.

== Background and historical context ==
=== Historical context ===
In 1954, the established educational format in the United States of segregating black and white students into separate schools was declared unconstitutional by the United States Supreme Court in Brown v. Board of Education of Topeka. This declaration caused a great deal of unrest in the political sphere and marked a gateway moment in the Civil Rights Movement. Education was an important aspect of the Civil Rights Movement.

The 1960s and early 1970s were marked by strife in the United States, from the assassination of John F. Kennedy in 1963 to the Vietnam War ongoing from 1955 until 1975. On top of those events, the Civil Rights Movement was in full force in the United States. From schools being integrated to the Montgomery bus boycott, from the Greensboro sit-ins to the march on Washington, equal rights for all was a prevalent ideal. President John F. Kennedy showed interest in cognitive impairment studies and President Lyndon Johnson used Federal funds to increase research on "at-risk" youth. Early intervention programs for children living in low socioeconomic situations, such as the Head Start Program, began showing up around the country. Education was soon at the forefront of many political agendas.

As of the early 1970s, U.S. public schools accommodated 1 out of 5 children with disabilities. Until that time, many states had laws that explicitly excluded children with certain types of disabilities from attending public school, including children who were blind, deaf, and children labeled "emotionally disturbed" or "mentally retarded." At the time, 3.5 million disabled children attended school but were "warehoused" in segregated facilities and received little or no effective instruction. More than 1 million children had no access to the public school system, with many of them living at state institutions where they received limited or no educational or rehabilitation services. About 75% of deaf or blind children attended state institutions.

=== Education for Handicapped Children (1975) ===
The first legislation to provide relief was the Rehabilitation Act of 1973.

Congress then enacted the Education for All Handicapped Children Act in 1975 to alleviate the financial burden created by litigation pursuant to the Rehabilitation Act. Public schools were required to evaluate children with disabilities and create an educational plan with parent input so as to emulate as closely as possible the educational experience of non-disabled students. Students should be placed in the least restrictive environment, one that allows the maximum possible opportunity to interact with non-impaired students. Separate schooling may occur only when the nature or severity of the disability is such that instructional goals cannot be achieved in the regular classroom. Finally, the law contains a due-process clause that guarantees an impartial hearing to resolve conflicts between the parents of disabled children and the school system.

The act also required that school districts provide administrative procedures so that parents of disabled children could dispute decisions made about their children's education. Once the administrative efforts were exhausted, parents were then authorized to seek judicial review of the administration's decision.

=== IDEA (1990) ===
In 1990, the Individuals with Disabilities Education Act replaced the EHA in order to place more focus on the individual, as opposed to a condition that individual may have. The IDEA also had many improvements on the EHA, such as promoting research and technology development, details on transition programs for students post-high school and programs that educate children in their neighborhood schools, as opposed to separate schools.

By 2003, only 25% of deaf or blind children were educated at state institutions.

As of 2006, more than 6 million children in the U.S. received special education services through IDEA.

== Six pillars of IDEA ==
=== Individualized Education Program (IEP) ===
The IDEA requires that public schools create an Individualized Education Program (IEP) for each student who is found to be eligible under both the federal and state eligibility/disability standards. The IEP describes the student's present levels of academic achievement and functional performance, and how the student's disabilities affect or would affect the child's involvement in the general education curriculum. The IEP also specifies the services to be provided and how often, and it specifies accommodations and modifications to be provided for the student.

The U.S. Supreme Court has described the IEP as "the centerpiece of the statute's education delivery system for disabled children". Honig v. Doe, 484 U.S. 305, 311 (1988) The IEP is the "basis for the handicapped child's entitlement to an individualized and appropriate education," and the school system must design the IEP "to meet the unique needs of each child with a disability." Phillip C. v. Jefferson County Bd. of Educ., 701 F. 3d 691, 694 (11th Cir. 2012), citing Doe v. Ala. State Dep't of Educ., 915 F.2d 651, 654 (11th Cir. 1990) and Winkelman v. Parma City Sch. Dist., 550 U.S. 516, 524 (2007). An IEP must be designed to meet the unique educational needs of that child in the Least Restrictive Environment appropriate to the needs of that child.

When a child qualifies for services, an IEP team is convened to design an education plan. In addition to the child's parents, the IEP team must include at least:

- one of the child's regular education teachers (if applicable);
- a special education teacher;
- someone who can interpret the educational implications of the child's evaluation, such as a school psychologist;
- any related service personnel deemed appropriate or necessary; and
- an administrator or CSE (Committee of Special Education) representative who has adequate knowledge of the availability of services in the district and the authority to commit those services on behalf of the child.

Parents are considered to be equal members of the IEP team along with the school staff. Based on the full educational evaluation results, this team collaborates to write for the individual child an IEP that will provide a free, appropriate public education.

=== Free Appropriate Public Education (FAPE) ===
Guaranteed by the IDEA, Free Appropriate Public Education (FAPE) is defined as "special education and related services that:

- A) are provided at the public's expense, under public supervision and direction, and without charge;
- B) meet the standards of the State educational agency;
- C) include an appropriate preschool, elementary, or secondary school education in the State involved; and
- D) are provided in conformity with the individualized education program under section 614(d). (Pub. L. No. 94-142, § 602(9))"

To provide FAPE, schools must provide students with an "education that emphasizes special education and related services designed to meet their unique needs and prepare them for further education, employment, and independent living."

The IDEA includes requirements that schools provide each disabled student an education that:

- is designed to meet the unique needs of that one student;
- provides "access to the general curriculum to meet the challenging expectations established for all children" (that is, it meets the approximate grade-level standards of the state educational agency.)
- is provided in accordance with the Individualized Education Plan (IEP) as defined in 1414(d)(3).
- results in educational benefit to the child.

=== Least restrictive environment (LRE) ===
The U.S. Department of Education, 2005a regulations implementing IDEA requires that "to the maximum extent appropriate, children with disabilities including children in public or private institutions or care facilities, are educated with children who are nondisabled." The regulations further state that "special classes, separate schooling or other removals of children with disabilities from regular educational environment occurs only if the nature or severity of the disability is such that education in regular classes with the use of supplementary aids and services cannot be achieved satisfactorily." In other words, the Least Restrictive Environment (LRE) is the environment most like that of typical children in which the child with a disability can succeed academically (as measured by the specific goals in the student's IEP).

The court in Daniel R. R. v. State Board of Education, relying on Roncker, developed a two-part test for determining whether the LRE requirement is met:

1. Can an appropriate education in the general education classroom with the use of supplementary aids and services be achieved satisfactorily?
2. If a student is placed in a more restrictive setting, is the student "integrated" to the "maximum extent appropriate"? (Standard in AL, DE, GA, FL, LA, MS, NJ, PA, TX).

=== Appropriate evaluation ===
Children become eligible to receive special education and related services through an evaluation process. If the evaluation is not appropriately conducted or does not monitor the information that is needed to determine placement, it is not appropriate. The goal of IDEA's regulations for evaluation is to help minimize the number of misidentifications; to provide a variety of assessment tools and strategies; to prohibit the use of any single evaluation as the sole criterion of whether a student is placed in special education services; to provide protections against evaluation measures that are racially or culturally discriminatory. Overall, the goal of appropriate evaluation is for students who need help to receive appropriate assistance and to help them reach the goals set by their respective IEP teams.

=== Parent and teacher participation ===
A good family-professional partnership is key for a student to receive the education necessary for success. Parents and teachers need to be willing to communicate and work together to determine the best ways of working with and providing information for a student. Both the family and the teacher work together on the IEP team to determine goals, the LRE, and to discuss other important considerations for each individual student. Throughout the whole IEP and special education process, parents and families should be updated and kept informed of any decisions made about their specific student. Parents should also be able to provide valuable input about their child to determine placement and other educational goals.

=== Procedural safeguard ===
Parents, as well as teachers, are able to challenge any decisions that they feel are inappropriate for the student. IDEA includes a set of procedural safeguards designed to protect the rights of children with disabilities and their families and to ensure that children with disabilities receive a FAPE.

IDEA guarantees to parents the following access to information:

- Access to their child's educational records;
- Parent participation in all IEP team meetings regarding identification, placement, and educational decisions;
- Prior written notice (Anytime anything will be changed in a student's IEP, their parents must be notified first.);
- Procedural safeguards written notice;
- Understandable language (Translators must be provided when needed.);
- Informed consent (Before any evaluations or services are provided, the student's parents must be informed and agree in writing before the school can move forward.); and
- Right to request independent educational evaluations at public expense,

For parents who disagree with the school's decisions, IDEA outlines the following dispute resolution guidelines:

- "Stay Put" rights (If parents disagree with the school's decision, the student can stay put while the parents and school go through dispute resolution.)
- Due process hearings (If a parent has a dispute with the school about their student's special education placement or teaching, a process called due process is used to resolve issues; both parties are then able to tell their sides of the story in a court-like setting.)
- Mediation (This is an alternative to due-process hearings.)
- Civil litigation (If due-process results are not to the liking of the parent or the school, a civil lawsuit can be filed)

== Other important issues ==
=== Litigation and costs ===
Several U.S. Supreme Court cases have outlined how litigation works under the IDEA. Parents have independent enforceable rights under the IDEA and may appear pro se on behalf of their children. Winkelman v. Parma City School District, 550 U.S. 516. Under the IDEA, the party that requests a hearing has the burden of proof in such an action. Schaffer v. Weast, 546 U.S. 49. Prevailing parents may not recover expert witness fees as part of the costs under 20 U.S.C.§ 1415(i)(3)(B). Arlington Central School Dist. Bd. of Ed. v. Murphy, 548 U.S. 291.

=== Confidentiality of information ===
Throughout the entire IEP process, the school must protect the confidentiality of the student. Some schools may think that providing a teacher with the IEP is a violation of the student's confidentiality, but the Family Educational Rights and Privacy Act States that "if the disclosure is to other school officials, including teachers, within the educational institution or local education agency who have been determined by the agency or institution to have legitimate educational interests", the school does not need written consent from a parent. For more information about confidentiality, see the Family Educational Rights and Privacy Act of 1974 (FERPA).

=== Transition services ===
At the age of 16, students are required to be invited to IEP meetings to discuss transition services with the IEP team. Transition services can be started earlier if the IEP team deems it necessary, but the student must be invited to the meeting, or appropriate measures must be taken to account for student preference. Transition services coordinate the transition between school and post-school activities, such as secondary education, vocational training, employment, independent living, etc. These transitional decisions should be based on the student's strengths/weaknesses, preferences, and the skills possessed by the individual. Once a decision has been made on the transition service, a plan should be formed to allow the student to be able to fully reach this goal. In order for this to happen, objectives, instruction needed, and other skills should be assessed and taken into account to prepare the individual for this transition.

=== Discipline of a child with a disability ===
Pursuant to IDEA, when disciplining a child with a disability, one must take that disability into consideration to determine the appropriateness of the disciplinary actions. For example, if a child with Autism is sensitive to loud noises, and she runs out of a room filled with loud noises due to sensory overload, appropriate disciplinary measure for that behavior (running out of the room) must take into account the child's disability, such as avoiding punishments that involve loud noises. Moreover, an assessment should be made as to whether appropriate accommodations were in place to meet the needs of the child. According to the United States Department of Education, in cases of children with disabilities who have been suspended for 10 or more days for each school year (including partial days), the local education agency (LEA) must hold a manifestation determination hearing within 10 school days of any decision to change the placement of a child resulting from a violation of code of student conduct. The Stay Put law states that a child shall not be moved from their current placement or interim services into an alternative placement if the infraction was deemed to cause danger to other students. The LEA, the parent, and relevant members of the individualized education program (IEP) team (as determined by the parent and LEA) shall review all relevant information in the student's file, including the child's IEP, any teacher observations, and any relevant information provided by the parents to determine whether the conduct in question was:

- caused by, or had a direct and substantial relationship to, the child's disability; or
- the direct result of the LEA's failure to implement the IEP.

If the LEA, the parent, and relevant members of the IEP team make the determination that the conduct was a manifestation of the child's disability, the IEP team shall:

- conduct a functional behavioral assessment and implement a behavioral intervention plan for such child, provided that the LEA had not conducted such assessment prior to such determination before the behavior that resulted in a change in placement described in Section 615(k)(1)(C) or (G);
- in the situation where a behavioral intervention plan has been developed, review the behavioral intervention plan if the child already has such a behavioral intervention plan, and modify it, as necessary, to address the behavior; and
- except as provided in Section 615(k)(1)(G), return the child to the placement from which the child was removed, unless the parent and the LEA agree to a change of placement as part of the modification of the behavior intervention plan.

If it is determined that a student's behavior is a manifestation of their disability, then he or she may not be suspended or expelled. However, under IDEA 2004, if a student "brings a weapon to school or a school function; or knowingly possess, uses, or sells illegal drugs or controlled substances at school or a school function"; or causes "serious bodily injury upon another person," he or she may be placed in an interim alternate educational setting (IAES) for up to 45 school days. This placement allows the student to continue receiving educational services while the IEP team has time to determine the appropriate placement and the appropriate course of action including reviewing the FBA and the BIP.

=== Prohibition on mandatory medication ===
Due to allegations that school officials coerced parents into administering medication such as Ritalin to their child, an amendment to the IDEA was added called prohibition on mandatory medication. Schools may not require parents to obtain a controlled substance as a condition of:

- attending school
- receiving an evaluation or reevaluation
- receiving special education services

== Alignment with No Child Left Behind ==
The reauthorization of IDEA in 2004 revised the statute to align with the requirements of the No Child Left Behind Act (NCLB). NCLB allows financial incentives to states who improve their special education services and services for all students. States who do not improve must refund these incentives to the federal government, allow parents choice of schools for their children, and abide by other provisions. Some states are still reluctant to educate students who are eligible for services under IDEA and seek remedies through the courts. However, IDEA and NCLB are still the laws of the land to date.

In looking to align NCLB and the 2004 reauthorization of IDEA, there are a few key areas of alignment: requirement of highly qualified teachers; an establishment of goals for students with disabilities; and assessment levels for these students. The alignment of NCLB and IDEA requires that all special education teachers be highly qualified. While the standards for being highly qualified may differ between state or school district, the minimum requirements are that a teacher hold a bachelor's degree from a four-year college, be certified and licensed to teach by the state and have taken the necessary tests to indicate competency in one's subject area, although special education teachers are often exempt from such testing. These requirements for highly qualified teachers do not always exist for private schools, elementary or secondary. Next, goals and assessments must be provided to align with students' educational needs. A state is allowed to develop alternate or modified assessments for students in special education programs, but benchmarks and progress must still be met on these tests that indicate adequate yearly progress (AYP). In addition, these goals and assessments must be aligned similarly to students enrolled in general education. Finally, in order to make AYP, schools may additionally require that schools meet state standards of student retention in terms of dropout rates and graduate rates for their special education students.

== Early intervention ==
The Education for All Handicapped Children Act of 1975 started the course of action for early intervention programs. In this Act, public schools that received federal funding were required to provide equal access to education for children with disabilities. Services for infants and toddlers were not included in the Act until the reauthorization in 1986.

On September 6, 2011, the US Department of Education updated the IDEA to include specific interventions for children of ages 2 and under who have disabilities. This section of the IDEA is entitled Part C and serves children with developmental delays or children who have conditions that may lead to future developmental delays. Part C is a $436-million initiative that will be administered at the state level.

On September 28, 2011, the Department of Education published an article in the Federal Register detailing the updates that have been made to Part C of the IDEA. The regulations are effective on October 28, 2011. Major changes in the regulations are detailed below:

- The definition of multidisciplinary has been revised to respect aspects of an updated individualized family service plan (IFSP) team.
- Native language is the language normally used by the parents of the child for any child who is deemed limited English proficient.
- A state's application must include how the State plans to follow the payor-of-last-resort requirements in Section 303.511
- A state's application must distinguish between pre-referral, referral, and post-referral IFSP activities such as screening, evaluations, assessments, IFSP development, etc.
- Such an application must specify that early identification information be provided in the native languages of various population groups in the State.
- A state must report to the public the performance of each Early Intervention System program in relation to the State's Annual Performance Report.

More specific details on Early Intervention requirements are found below.

== Part C of IDEA ==
=== Individualized Family Service Plan (IFSP) ===
An Individualized Family Service Plan (IFSP) is a strengths-based plan of care for the infant/toddler having a developmental delay or disability. The plan is based on a child and family assessment of strengths and needs as well as the results of multidisciplinary evaluations administered by qualified professionals meeting their state's certification guidelines. The IFSP is similar to an IEP in that it addresses specific services; who will provide them and when/where, how often, etc.; is monitored and updated frequently. Unlike an IEP, however, the IFSP addresses the needs of not only the child but also the family to meet their family goals and specified outcomes as relates to assisting in their child's development. All infants and toddlers receiving early intervention services under Part C of IDEA are required to have an IFSP in order to receive services. Part C of IDEA is the program that awards grants to every state in the United States to provide early intervention services to children from birth to age 3 who have disabilities and to their families. Part C of IDEA also allows states to define "developmental delay" (either as a standard deviation or a percent delay in chronological months) for eligibility. States provide early intervention services to the children who have medically diagnosed disabilities as well as children who exhibit developmental delays. Some states opt to expand services to "at risk" infants and toddlers and define in state statutes what constitutes a child at risk for developmental delay. In order to receive funding, participating states must provide early intervention to every eligible child and the respective family, regardless of pay source. Lastly, services from Part C are not necessarily free – early intervention programs, as the payor of last resort, make use of public and private insurance, community resources, and some states implement a "sliding scale" of fees for services not covered by public or private insurance.

=== Goals for an IFSP ===
The goal of an IFSP is to assist the family in meeting their child's developmental needs in order for the infant or toddler (birth to age three) to increase functional abilities, gain independence and mobility, and be an active participant in his/her family and community. Another goal of early intervention in general is to improve a child's functional abilities, particularly in the domains of communication, cognitive ability, and social/emotional well-being in preparation for preschool and later kindergarten so that extensive special education services will not be necessary for the child's academic success. Once an infant/toddler is determined eligible (each state setting its own eligibility requirements), the family identifies whom they would like to participate as part of the IFSP team. The Individuals with Disabilities Education Act (IDEA) Part C requires that the IFSP team consist of the family and at least two early intervention professionals from different disciplines (one being the service coordinator) – consistent with CFR §303.343(a)(1)(iv). However, the family may choose to include other members on the team such as the child's pediatrician, an early- intervention service provider who may be working with the child, a parent advocate or trusted friend/family member.

The IFSP team works with the family to create a "service plan" to address the deficits of the infant or toddler and to assist the family in meeting their goals for their child's (and family's) development. The team uses information that the family provides as well as the results of at least two evaluations, all available medical records, and the informed clinical opinion of the professionals serving on the IFSP team. An initial IFSP is then created with the family. An IFSP will outline the following:

1. the child's current levels of physical, cognitive, communication, social or emotional, and adaptive development;
2. the family's resources, priorities, and concerns to help in their child's development;
3. the desired result for the child and for the family (goals/outcomes), as well as the steps needed to achieve said result (objectives). The plan will be monitored and evaluated quarterly to gauge progress. If the family chooses to revise the goals or the plan, they include updates as revised additions to the plan.
4. the early intervention services for the child and the family, including how often and the method of how the child and the family will receive the services, the different environments in which the services will be provided and justification for services not provided in the "natural environment" as defined by IDEA (the location where a child without a disability would spend most of his/her time). For example, the family might have requested to receive services for the child at a day-care center or in their home.
5. the date the services will begin and their anticipated duration.
6. the identification of the service coordinator from the profession most immediately relevant to the infant's or toddler's family's needs, the person who will be responsible for the implementation and coordination of the plan with the other agencies and persons.
7. For toddlers approaching the third birthday, the IFSP will include a transition plan outlining the steps, activities, and services needed to support the transition of the toddler with a disability to preschool or other appropriate services.

In summary, a key to an effective IFSP is to include outcomes that "address the entire family's well-being and not only outcomes designed to benefit the child's development." For this reason, the IFSP will inherently have goals that are designed for the family as well as for the child. The service coordinator will help the early-intervention team of service providers write objectives that meet the family's priorities and concerns.

=== Differences between IFSP and IEP ===
When writing the IFSP for a child, the IFSP can (but will not always) outline services that are not one of the seventeen mandated early-intervention services under Part C of the IDEA. For example, a parent may need counseling services to overcome debilitating depression in order to better care for the infant or toddler, and these services will be written into the family's plan. The IEP (Individualized Education Plan) cannot include services to meet "family goals" but must focus solely on what the child needs to achieve academic success in an educational setting (whether the class or activity is academic or extra-curricular in nature).

The Individualized Family Service Plan is different compared to an Individual Education Plan in other key ways:

1. Eligibility for early intervention (birth to three) under Part C of IDEA is set by each state individually and is often different from eligibility for special education (3–22) under Part B of IDEA.
2. The IFSP will have goals and outcomes for the family and for the infant's/toddler's development.
3. Goals on the IFSP may be in non-academic areas of development such as mobility, self-care, and social/emotional well-being. The IEP has goals and outcomes for the child only and related entirely to his/her ability to adapt to and progress in an educational setting.
4. The IFSP includes services to help a family in natural environment settings (not just in daycare/preschool) but at home, in the community, etc. Services and activities on the IFSP could be tailored to include "nap time," "infant swimming lessons at the YMCA," "church outings," etc. The IEP provides services solely on what happens in a pre-school or K-5 school environment or school-sponsored field trip/activity
5. The IFSP team involves a service coordinator who assists the family in developing and implementing the IFSP. The IEP team also involves the family, but the school district generally does not provide a professional who represents them and provides case management/service coordination. The family will have to communicate with the special education department's designee.

=== Child Abuse Prevention and Treatment Act ===
The Keeping Children and Families Safe Act of 2003 (P.L. 108–36) amended CAPTA by requiring that cases of abused and neglected children, or those pre- or post-natally exposed to illegal substances, be referred to early intervention services using IDEA Part C funds. This provision is also reflected in the 2004 revision of IDEA. Specifically, states can apply for grant money from IDEA for specific identification and referral programs.

Abused and neglected children are included under IDEA part C due to the growing body of evidence showing increased risk of developmental delay among children in the child welfare system. In 2013, there were an estimated 679,000 victims of child abuse and neglect. Nearly half (47%) were five years or younger. The results of the 2008 National Survey of Child and Adolescent Well-Being (NSCAW) reported that children in Child Welfare had below average cognitive, behavioral, daily living, language, social-emotional and social skills compared to their peers. Slightly less than half of children five and under showed developmental delay. A social and emotional assessment given to caretakers of these children showed 34.1% had a possible problem, and 27.0% had a possible social/emotional deficit or delay compared to 25% and 15%, respectively, in a standardized population. Neurodevelopmentally, children in the child welfare system have risks similar to those of premature and low-birth-weight infants. Children in this population scored nearly one standard deviation below the mean of the early-cognitive-development tool used for assessment. Language skills fell almost one standard deviation below the norm as well. Overall, 42.6% of children aged one to five years showed a need for developmental support, making them potentially eligible for early intervention services.

In order to track the adherence to the law, the Child Abuse Prevention and Treatment Act Reauthorization Act of 2010 (P.L. 111–320) required that eligible children and those actually referred to EI be reported by each state beginning in 2014. A 2008 survey of 30 participating states by the IDEA Infant and Toddler Coordinators Association showed that 65% of children under three who are abused or neglected are being routinely screened for developmental delays. Fifty percent of respondents did not know whether their referrals for Part C had increased or decreased in the prior year. As noted by many respondents to this survey, the referral system needs more funding and better communication among child welfare personnel.

== Relationship between IDEA and Section 504 ==
Section 504 of the Rehabilitation Act of 1973 is another law which assures certain protections to certain students with disabilities. §504 states that:

"No otherwise qualified individual with a disability in the United States . . . shall, solely by reason of her or his disability, be excluded from the participation in, be denied the benefits of, or be subjected to discrimination under any program or activity receiving Federal financial assistance . . . .". 29 U.S.C. 794(a).

Recipients of this Federal financial assistance include public school districts, institutions of higher education, and other state and local education agencies. The regulations implementing Section 504 in the context of educational institutions appear at 34 C.F.R. Part 104 D. §504 applies to all programs or activities, including schools, that receive federal financial assistance. See 29 U.S.C. 794(b)(2)(B) (defining "program or activity" to include the operations of "local educational agenc[ies]").

Eligibility under §504 is different from that under IDEA. While IDEA recognizes thirteen categories of disability, §504 defines individuals with disabilities to include any individual with a physical or mental condition which substantially limits at least one major life activity. 29 U.S.C. 705(20). It also includes persons with a history of such a disability and those who are perceived to have a disability. Most, if not all, children eligible under IDEA are also entitled to §504's protections. Regulations promulgated by the Department of Education offer additional guidance regarding the statute's prohibitions in the context of this case. See 34 C.F.R. 104 et seq.

Like IDEA, §504's regulations include "child find" provisions. Thus, public school districts have an affirmative duty to identify and evaluate every qualified child with disabilities residing in the recipient's jurisdiction who is not receiving a public education and take appropriate steps to notify persons with disabilities and their parents or guardians of the recipient's duties under §504. 34 C.F.R. 104.32.

The Section 504 regulations require a school district to provide a "free appropriate public education" (FAPE) to each qualified student with a disability who is in the school district's jurisdiction, regardless of the nature or severity of the disability. Under Section 504, FAPE consists of the provision of regular or special education and related aids and services designed to meet the student's individual educational needs as adequately as the needs of nondisabled students are met.

== Legislative history ==
1975— The Education for All Handicapped Children Act (EAHCA) became law. It was renamed the Individuals with Disabilities Education Act (IDEA) in 1990.

1990— IDEA first came into being on October 30, 1990, when the "Education of All Handicapped Children Act" (itself having been introduced in 1975) was renamed "Individuals with Disabilities Education Act." (Pub. L. No. 101-476, 104 Stat. 1142). IDEA received minor amendments in October 1991 (Pub. L. No. 102-119, 105 Stat. 587).

1997— IDEA received significant amendments. The definition of disabled children expanded to include developmentally delayed children between three and nine years of age. It also required parents to attempt to resolve disputes with schools and Local Educational Agencies (LEAs) through mediation, and provided a process for doing so. The amendments authorized additional grants for technology, disabled infants and toddlers, parent training, and professional development. (Pub. L. No. 105-17, 111 Stat. 37).

2004— IDEA was amended by the Individuals With Disabilities Education Improvement Act of 2004, now known as IDEIA. Several provisions aligned IDEA with the No Child Left Behind Act of 2001, signed by President George W. Bush. It authorized fifteen states to implement 3-year IEPs on a trial basis when parents continually agree. Drawing on the report of the President's Commission on Excellence in Special Education, the law revised the requirements for evaluating children with learning disabilities. More concrete provisions relating to discipline of special education students were also added. (Pub. L. No. 108-446, 118 Stat. 2647).

2008— Americans with Disabilities Act Amendments Act was signed into law in September.

2009— Following a campaign promise for "funding the Individuals with Disabilities Education Act", President Barack Obama signed the American Recovery and Reinvestment Act of 2009 (ARRA), including $12.2 billion in additional funds.

2009— Americans with Disabilities Act Amendments Act became effective on January 1, 2009

== Selected U.S. Supreme Court decisions ==
=== Cedar Rapids Community School Dist. v. Garret F. ===
Cedar Rapids Community School Dist. v. Garret F. 526 U.S. 66 (1999) was a Supreme Court case in which the Court, relying heavily on Irving Independent School Dist. v. Tatro, 468 U. S. 883 (1984), ruled that the related IDEA services provision required public school districts to fund "continuous, one-on-one nursing care for disabled children" such as the ventilator-dependent child in this case, despite arguments from the school district concerning the costs of the services." There is no undue burden exemption. Under the Court's reading of the IDEA's relevant provisions, medical treatments such as suctioning, ventilator checks, catheterization, and others which can be administered by non-physician personnel come within the parameters of the special education law's related services. Disability advocates considered the Court decision to be a "substantial victory for families of children with disabilities." Amendments were made in the Education Flexibility Partnership Act of 1999 to increase IDEA funding as a result of the case.

=== Forest Grove School District v. T.A. ===
The case of Forest Grove School District v. T.A., 129 S.Ct. 2484 (2009) addressed the issue of whether the parents of a student who has never received special education services from a public school district are potentially eligible for reimbursement of private school tuition for that student under the IDEA. The Supreme Court held that parents of disabled children can seek reimbursement for private education expenses regardless whether their child had previously received special-education services from a public school. By a vote of six to three, the Court held that the IDEA authorizes reimbursement whenever a public school fails to make a free appropriate public education (FAPE) available to a disabled child.

=== Endrew F. v. Douglas County School District ===
Endrew F. v. Douglas County School District is a Supreme Court case about "the level of educational benefit school districts must provide students with disabilities as defined by IDEA. The case is described by advocates as "the most significant special-education issue to reach the high court in three decades." On March 22, 2017, the Supreme Court ruled 8–0 in favor of students with disabilities saying that meaningful, "appropriately ambitious" progress goes further than what the lower courts had held.

The U.S. Supreme Court heard the "potentially groundbreaking case" brought by a "Douglas County couple who claim that their autistic son was not provided an adequate education in the public school system as required by federal law." Access to public education through IDEA was affirmed in 1982 in Board of Education v. Rowley, but the quality of guaranteed education for students with disabilities under IDEA had not been addressed. This Supreme Court case has the potential to "affect the education of 6.7 million children with disabilities" as the Court "struggles "to decide whether it should require public schools to do more under a federal law that calls for them to provide a free education that addresses the children's needs. There are others who contend that the Endrew case may be applicable to all of the 76 million students enrolled in U.S. public schools due to the 14th Amendment Equal Protection Clause. The right to an equal educational opportunity is one of the most valuable rights you have, says ACLU.org. ""

In 2010, Endrew, who was in public school in Douglas County School District RE-1, began to exhibit "severe behavioral issues." The parents removed their child from the public school and enrolled him in a private specialized school for children with autism with an annual tuition of $70,000. The family requested reimbursement for the tuition claiming the Douglas County School District had not fulfilled the requirements of IDEA. They lost their case before the United States District Court for the District of Colorado, and before the Appeals Court. Their argument was that "the federal statute only requires that schools provide students with "some educational benefit.""

Supreme Court Justices Stephen G. Breyer, Samuel Alito, and Anthony M. Kennedy expressed concerns about the implications of implementing IDEA with changes in quality of education standards. Breyer cautioned about potential rising costs of litigation, for example, extraneous lawsuits. Kennedy questioned the financial cost to districts with severely disabled students; Alito considered the burden on poorer school districts.

Only two of the circuit courts had set "meaningful educational benefit" standard. The Supreme Court will decide whether a uniform standard should apply nationally.

Justice Ruth Bader Ginsburg cited the Board of Education v. Rowley (1982) 458 U.S. 176 (1982) in which the Court held that public schools were "not required by law to provide sign language interpreters to deaf students who are otherwise receiving an equal and adequate education."

The parents claimed that schools should provide "substantially equal educational opportunities" and that "[IDEA] does not permit cost to trump what the act otherwise requires. Schools should provide "a level of educational services designed to allow the child to progress from grade to grade in the general curriculum."

== See also ==
- Family Educational Rights and Privacy Act (FERPA)
- Learning disability
- IDEA Fairness Restoration Act
- Related services under IDEA
