= Education for All Handicapped Children Act =

USA law granting equal access to education for children with disabilities

- Long title: Education for All Handicapped Children Act
- Acronyms (colloquial): EAHCA/EHA
- Enacted by: the 94th United States Congress

Citations
- Public law: Pub. L. 94-142

Codification
- Titles amended: 20 U.S.C.: Education

Legislative history
- Passed the Senate on June 18, 1975 (83-10); Passed the House on July 29, 1975; Reported by the joint conference committee on November 14, 1975; agreed to by the House on November 18, 1975 (404-7) and by the Senate on November 19, 1975 (87-7); Signed into law by President Gerald Ford on November 29, 1975

Major amendments
- Individuals with Disabilities Education Act

United States Supreme Court cases
- Board of Education of the Hendrick Hudson Central School District v. Rowley, 458 U.S. 176 (1982); Irving Independent School Dist. v. Tatro, 468 U.S. 883 (1984); Smith v. Robinson, 468 U.S. 992 (1984); Honig v. Students of Cal. School for Blind, 471 U.S. 148 (1985); Burlington School Comm. v. Mass. Dept. of Ed., 471 U.S. 359 (1985); Honig v. Doe, 484 U.S. 305 (1988); Dellmuth v. Muth, 491 U.S. 223 (1989)

The Education for All Handicapped Children Act (sometimes referred to using the acronyms EAHCA or EHA, or Public Law (PL) 94-142) was enacted by the United States Congress in 1975. This act required all public schools accepting federal funds to provide equal access to education. Public schools were required to evaluate children with disabilities and create an educational plan with parent input that would emulate as closely as possible the educational experience of non-disabled students. The act was an amendment to Part B of the Education of the Handicapped Act enacted in 1966.

The act also required that school districts provide administrative procedures so that parents of disabled children could dispute decisions made about their children's education. Once the administrative efforts were exhausted, parents were then authorized to seek judicial review of the administration's decision. Prior to the enactment of EHA, parents could take their disputes straight to the judiciary under the Rehabilitation Act of 1973. The mandatory system of dispute resolution created by EHA was an effort to alleviate the financial burden created by litigation pursuant to the Rehabilitation Act.

PL 94-142 also contains a provision that disabled students should be placed in the least restrictive environment-one that allows the maximum possible opportunity to interact with non-disabled students. Separate schooling may only occur when the nature or severity of the disability is such that instructional goals cannot be achieved in the regular classroom. Finally, the law contains a due process clause that guarantees an impartial hearing to resolve conflicts between the parents of disabled children to the school system.

The law was passed to meet four huge goals:

1. To ensure that special education services are available to children who need them
2. To guarantee that decisions about services to students with disabilities are fair and appropriate
3. To establish specific management and auditing requirements for special education
4. To provide federal funds to help the states educate students with disabilities

EHA was revised and renamed as the Individuals with Disabilities Education Act in 1990 for improvement of special education and inclusive education.

== Functional relationship between EHA, the Rehabilitation Act, and the equal protection clause ==
The Supreme Court decided that EHA would be the exclusive remedy for disabled students asserting their right to equal access to public education in Smith v. Robinson, 468 U.S. 992 (1984). The petitioner, Tommy Smith, was an eight-year-old student who had cerebral palsy. The school district in Cumberland, Rhode Island originally agreed to subsidize Tommy's education by placing him in a program for special needs children at the Emma Pendleton Bradley Hospital. The school district later decided to remove Tommy from that program and send him to the Rhode Island Division of Mental Health, Retardation and Hospitals, which was severely understaffed and underfunded. This transfer would have effectively terminated Tommy's public education. Tommy's parents appealed the school district's decision through the administrative process created by EAHCA. Once the administrative process was exhausted, the Smiths sought judicial review pursuant to the EAHCA, § 504 of the Rehabilitation Act, and 42 U.S.C. § 1983.

The United States Supreme Court held that the administrative process created by EHA was the exclusive remedy for disabled students asserting their right to equal access to education. "Allowing a plaintiff to circumvent the EHA administrative remedies would be inconsistent with Congress’ carefully tailored scheme...We conclude, therefore, that where the EHA is available to a disabled child asserting a right to a free appropriate public education, based either on the EHA or on the Equal Protection Clause of the Fourteenth Amendment, the EHA is the exclusive avenue through which the child and his parents or guardian can pursue their claim." The court based its decision on a contextual analysis of the applicable statutes. To permit a student to rely on § 504 or the § 1983 would be to effectively eliminate the EHA, because it would circumvent the EHA’s requirement that petitioners first exhaust their administrative options before seeking judicial intervention.

In the face of this Supreme Court decision, the United States Congress passed an amendment to the EHA which explicitly overruled the Supreme Court's decision in two ways: (1) The amended law allowed parents to collect attorney's fees upon winning a case against the school. (2) The amended law permitted parents to bring a lawsuit under either EHA, § 504, or § 1983 once the administrative remedies had been exhausted.

== Attempt to weaken EHA ==
In the 1980s, the Reagan administration attempted to weaken EHA, but Patrisha Wright and Evan Kemp Jr. (of the Disability Rights Center) led a grassroots and lobbying campaign against this that generated more than 40,000 cards and letters. In 1984, the administration dropped its attempts to weaken EHA; however, they did end the Social Security benefits of hundreds of thousands of disabled recipients.
