= Gravamen =

A gravamen (from Latin gravare, to weigh down; gravis, heavy), (plural gravamens or gravamina) is a complaint or grievance, the ground of a legal action, and particularly the more serious part of a charge against an accused person. In legal terms, it is the essential element of a lawsuit.

In English the term is used chiefly in legal submissions and judicial opinions. The word is commonly misspelled gravaman.

Apart from the normal usage of the word, the gravamen test is used in contract law to distinguish between the sale of goods and services in "hybrid" transactions. Under the test each component of the sale is isolated and individually determined to be either a good or a service. The more common approach used by courts is the predominant purpose test which looks at the general thrust of the exchange rather than each individual component.

The term is also used in ecclesiastical courts, being the technical designation of a memorial presented from the Lower to the Upper House of Convocation, setting forth grievances to be redressed, or calling attention to breaches in church discipline.

== See also ==
- Easement
