= Abuse in special education =

Type of institutional abuse

Abuse in special education includes the use of restraint and seclusion in special education settings for disabled students, but can also refer to students being threatened with violence or staff withholding food. This abuse often leaves students with trauma and can leave the parents feeling guilt for the abuse.

Abuse in special education also includes physical and sexual abuse by educators and other staff members.

== Types of abuse ==
=== Aversives ===
Special educators sometimes use aversive techniques as a way to change the behavior of disabled students. Aversives used in special education include lemon juice, noxious odors, and electric shock. Use of aversive techniques can be effective in behavior modification and is sometimes recommended for severe self-injurious behavior. However, there are significant concerns associated with its use, including "withdrawal, aggression, generalization, imitation, and negative self-statements."

=== Restraints and seclusion ===
Restraints are used in special education to prevent unwanted student behavior or to impose punishment. Physical restraints can include tie-downs or forced holding. Risks associated with restraint use in special education include physical and psychological injury to students and staff members. Many students have gone home with bruises from being restrained by staff often without being properly reported and leaving the student with trauma.

Although restraints can be used in general education settings, they are disproportionately used in special education. Research in the United States indicated that 80% of students who were restrained at school in the 2017–2018 school year received special education services. Additionally, most identified cases of abuse or death resulting from physical restraint at school in the United States between 1990 and 2009 involved disabled students.

Students are also locked in what are called seclusion rooms or padded cells. The U.S. Civil Rights Data Collection initiative defines seclusion as "the involuntary confinement of a student alone in a room or area from which the student is physically prevented from leaving." In 2015, an 8-year-old student at a California school was dragged down his school's hallways by three staff members and locked in a windowless seclusion room; he was later found laying in his own blood. Research in the United States indicated that 80% of students who were subjected to seclusion at school in the 2017–2018 school year received special education services.

One infamous incident of restraint use in special education resulting in death was a 2018 case involving an autistic 13-year-old boy named Max Benson, who was held in a prone physical restraint by staff at his K-12 private school Guiding Hands School in El Dorado County. The restraint occurred for 90 minutes and Benson became unconscious after urinating and vomiting on himself. Staff performed CPR to no avail, so Benson was rushed to the Folsom UC David Medical Center. He was pronounced dead two days later. Following Benson's death, Guiding Hands School lost state certification and was shut down in January 2019.

=== Sexual abuse ===
Research about abuse in disabled children indicates that many face sexual abuse while in educational settings. Students with vision and hearing impairment in special education schools in Botswana reported sexual abuse including groping and rape. The same study also reported physical abuse and financial exploitation.

== Underlying causes ==
Multiple factors contribute to the increased risk of abuse faced by disabled children in special educational settings, including:

- Conditioning to "comply with authority"
- Perception of students as "easy targets"
- Students being unable to recognize abuse
- Students being unable to report abuse
- Limited access to information on sexual abuse prevention

== See also ==
- Disability abuse
- Institutional abuse
- Seclusion and restraint practices in the U.S. education system
