= Christopher J. Mruk =

American psychologist, educator, author, and clinical practitioner

Christopher J. Mruk is an American psychologist, educator, author, and clinical practitioner whose research focuses on psychology of self-esteem, humanistic psychology, and positive psychology. He is professor emeritus of psychology at Bowling Green State University. His work is associated with the development of the Existential Humanistic Two-Factor Theory of Self-Esteem.

He was elected a Fellow of the American Psychological Association in 2017 and served as an associate editor of The Humanistic Psychologist.

== Education and career ==
Mruk received a B.S. in psychology from Michigan State University in 1971 and a Ph.D. in clinical psychology from Duquesne University in 1981.

Before entering academia, Mruk worked in clinical and community mental health settings, including heroin addiction treatment, crisis intervention, and counseling. He joined Bowling Green State University in 1984 as a professor of psychology at Firelands College, where he taught and conducted research for more than four decades. He received the university's Professorship of Teaching Excellence, Lifetime Achievement Award, and Legacy Faculty Award.

== Research ==
Mruk's research focuses on self-esteem, humanistic psychology, and positive psychology. He developed the Two-Factor Theory of Self-Esteem, which conceptualizes self-esteem as the interaction of competence and worthiness.

His work has also examined existential and humanistic approaches to psychology, qualitative and quantitative research, authenticity, and the relationship between humanistic and positive psychology.

== Selected publications ==
=== Books ===
- Mruk, Christopher J. (1984). Facilitating the Acquisition of Computer Skills for Adults: A Handbook of Findings and Recommendations. Office of Human Development Services.
- Mruk, Christopher J. (2013-03-28). Self-Esteem and Positive Psychology, 4th Edition: Research, Theory, and Practice. Springer Publishing Company. ISBN 978-0-8261-0899-9.
- Mruk, Christopher J. (2003). Zen & Psychotherapy: Integrating Traditional and Nontraditional Approaches. Springer Publishing Company. ISBN 978-0-8261-2034-2.
- Hippler, Rachelle Kristof; Mruk, Christopher J. (2017). COMPUTING-BASED SELF-ESTEEM: THE INTERPLAY OF COMPETENCE AND WORTHINESS. Bowling Green State University.
- Mruk, Christopher J. (2019). Feeling Good by Doing Good: A Guide to Authentic Self-esteem and Well-being. Oxford University Press. ISBN 978-0-19-063716-3.
- Mruk, Christopher J.; Moor, John C. (2020). Succeeding at Your Internship: A Handbook Written for and with Students. Bowling Green State University Libraries.

=== Journals ===
- Mruk, Christopher J. (2008). "The psychology of self-esteem: A potential common ground for humanistic positive psychology and positivistic positive psychology". The Humanistic Psychologist. 36 (2): 143–158. doi:10.1080/08873260802111176. ISSN 1547-3333.
- Mruk, Christopher J. (2010). "Integrated description: A qualitative method for an evidence-based world". The Humanistic Psychologist. 38 (4): 305–316. doi:10.1080/08873267.2010.519976. ISSN 1547-3333.
- Mruk, Christopher J. (2013-06-01). "Defining Self-Esteem as a Relationship between Competence and Worthiness: How a Two-Factor Approach Integrates the Cognitive and Affective Dimensions of Self-Esteem". Polish Psychological Bulletin. 44 (2): 157–164. doi:10.2478/ppb-2013-0018. ISSN 0079-2993.
- Churchill, Scott D.; Mruk, Christopher J. (2014). "Practicing what we preach in humanistic and positive psychology". American Psychologist. 69 (1): 90–92. doi:10.1037/a0034868. ISSN 1935-990X.
- Mruk, Christopher J.; Skelly, Travis (2017). "Is self-esteem absolute, relative, or functional? Implications for cross-cultural and humanistic psychology". The Humanistic Psychologist. 45 (4): 313–332. doi:10.1037/hum0000075. ISSN 1547-3333.
- Mruk, Christopher J. (1983). "Toward A Phenomenology of Self-Esteem". Duquesne Studies in Phenomenological Psychology. 4: 137–149. doi:10.5840/dspp1983411. ISSN 2328-5311.
