= Padded cell =

Room in a psychiatric hospital

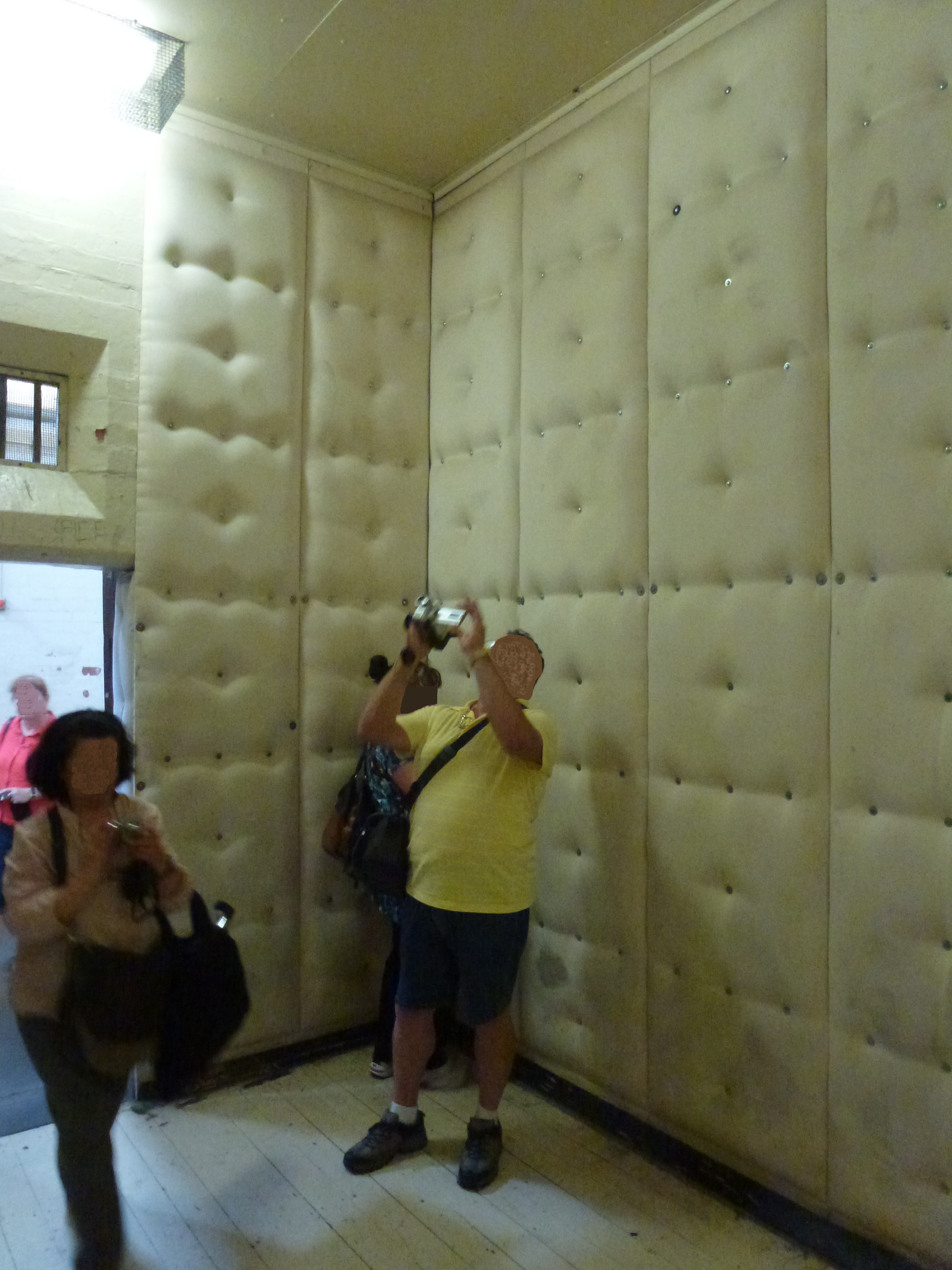
A no-longer-in-use padded cell at the Old Melbourne Gaol in Melbourne, Australia. Photographed in 2012.

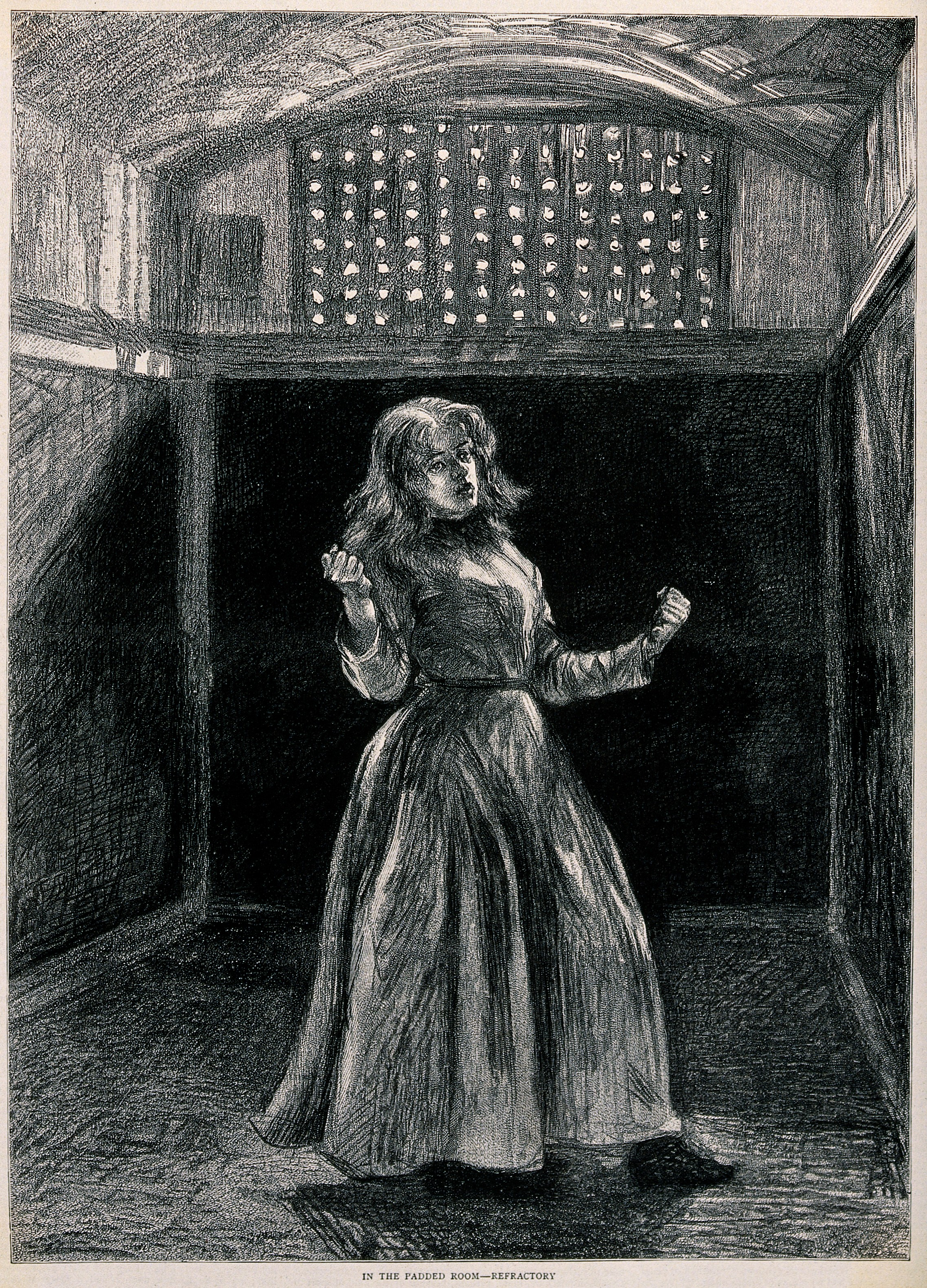
A woman in a seclusion room, 1889

A padded cell or seclusion room is a controversial enclosure used in a psychiatric hospital or a special education setting in a private or public school, in which there are cushions lining the walls and sometimes the floor as well. The padding is used in an attempt to prevent patients from hurting themselves by hitting their head (or other body parts) on the hard surface of the walls. In most cases, an individual's placement in a padded cell is involuntary.

Other names used are rubber room, padded room, time-out room, calming room, quiet room, or personal safety room.

== History ==
The padded cell was first envisioned by the physician John Conolly in 1844. Conolly believed in the non-restraint method of treatment for asylum patients, though he recognised that this was not possible for all patients. The padded cell was designed as a room with soft walls and floor, which would prevent patients from hurting themselves. Patients were often temporarily put in padded cells when they were agitated, and the space served as a place where they could calm down in isolation. John Charles Bucknill and Daniel Hack Tuke also suggested that padded rooms could be used to hold patients that were liable to wandering in the night and injuring themselves.

Conolly's padded cell at Hanwell Asylum was described by Andrew Howe and Faisil Sethi: "The floor and the walls within the reach of the patient were all padded with soft material made from cocoa-nut fibre. It contained no furniture apart from pillows. There was a window but this was covered by a blind. Clothing and bedding were both made of thick material so they could not be torn and made into ligatures." Inspectors reported that the padded cell at Hanwell Asylum benefited patients by calming them. In 1897, a patient named George W. wrote to the superintendent of Bethlem Hospital from inside a padded cell: he complained about the smell of the cell, boredom and difficulty sleeping.

At Bethlem Hospital, seclusion in a padded cell became preferable to restraining a patient. According to Sarah Chaney, most asylums likely had more than one padded cell. As asylum populations increased, county asylums came to rely on restraint methods like padded cells to cope with overcrowding and poor staffing.

The use of padded cells declined alongside the prevalence of psychiatric asylums. Padded cells are now frequently present in mind museums and asylum museums.

== Use ==
The length of time patients are kept in a padded cell varies greatly. Some patients remained locked in a padded cell for several days. A patient might also be made to wear a straitjacket if they are considered at risk of self-harm.

The use of padded cells and straitjackets declined drastically following the introduction of psychotropic drugs in the 1950s. Personal Safety Rooms are still used throughout the world and can be beneficial in providing a safe environment for not only occupants but also staff, and can prevent work-related injuries in the facilities.

== Current practice ==
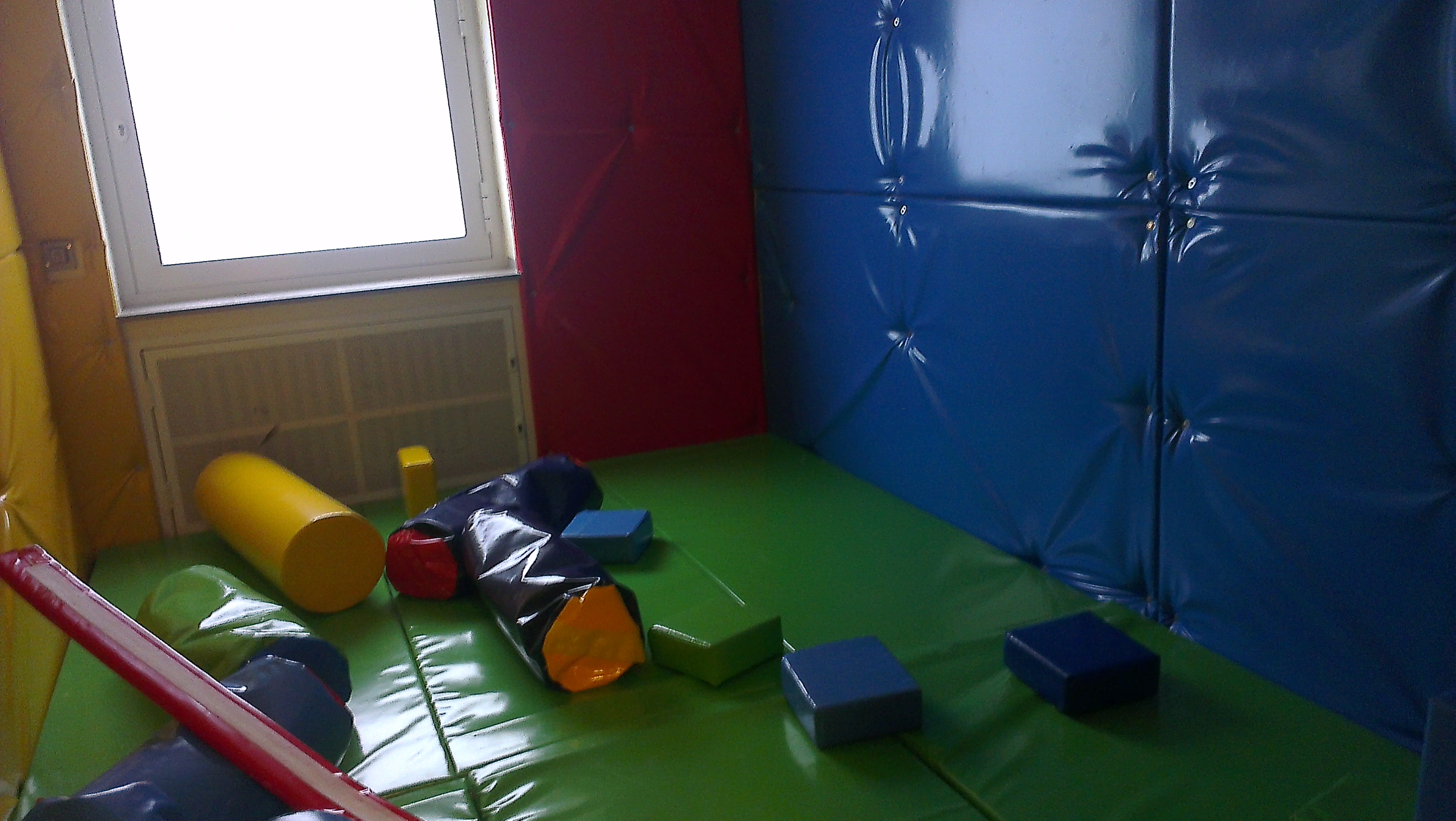
Seclusion room in a psychiatric hospital in Germany

In the UK, seclusion is defined by the Mental Health Act 1983 Code of Practice as: "the supervised confinement of a patient in a room, which may be locked. Its sole aim is to contain severely disturbed behavior that is likely to cause harm to others." The Code of Practice (paragraph 26.109) says that a seclusion room should only be used for that purpose and should have the following features as summarized in the guide published by the Care Quality Commission:

- "Allow for communication with the patient when the patient is in the room and the door is locked, for example, via an intercom"
- "Include limited furnishings, which should include a bed, pillow, mattress and blanket or covering"
- "Have no apparent safety hazards"
- "Have robust, reinforced window(s) that provide natural light (where possible the window should be positioned to enable a view outside)"
- "Have externally controlled lighting, including a main light and subdued lighting for night time"
- "Have robust door(s) which open outwards"
- "Have externally controlled heating and/or air conditioning, which enables those observing the patient to monitor the room temperature"
- "Have no blind spots and alternate viewing panels should be available where required"
- "Always have a clock visible to the patient from within the room"
- "Have access to toilet and washing facilities"

== Criticism ==
There is evidence that seclusion rooms and padded cells are used as punishment for minor behavioral problems in public schools and special education programs. There have also been cases of students being locked in seclusion rooms only to be found covered in blood later.

In the United States, there have been multiple unsuccessful attempts to ban the use of seclusion rooms in schools by Congress.

In 2021, 500 hours of footage of autistic children from Whitefield School secluded in padded rooms was discovered. Inspectors described the rooms as lacking natural light and that "occupants are unable to see outside or hear clearly". Some families reported that the secluded children developed PTSD after being placed in these rooms. Whitefield School's use of padded rooms was later reported on in the programme The School Prison Cells which was broadcast by the BBC in 2024.

In 2024, Irabina Autism Services in Australia was sued for using illegal forms of restraint on children with learning disabilities. As part of the "Severe Behaviour Program", children were kept in a small padded room for several hours.

== See also ==
- Abuse in special education
- Restraint and seclusion
- Keeping All Students Safe Act
