= Keeping All Students Safe Act =

Proposed legislation

The Keeping All Students Safe Act or KASSA (H.R. 3474, S. 1858) is designed to protect children from the abuse of restraint and seclusion in school. The first Congressional bill was introduced in the United States House of Representatives on December 9, 2007, and named the Preventing Harmful Restraint and Seclusion in Schools Act. The primary sponsors of the two bills are Senator Tom Harkin (D-IA), Chair of the Senate Health, Education, Labor, and Pensions Committee, Congressman George Miller (D-CA), Ranking Member of the House Education and Workforce Committee, and Congressman Gregg Harper (R-MS).

== Background and legislative history ==
Congress	Short title	Bill number(s)	Date introduced	Sponsor(s)	# of cosponsors	Latest status
111th Congress	Keeping All Students Safe Act	H.R. 4247	December 9, 2009	George Miller (D-CA)	40	Passed House (262-153)
111th Congress	Keeping All Students Safe Act	S. 3895	September 29, 2010	Chris Dodd (D-CT)	1	Died in committee
112th Congress	Keeping All Students Safe Act	H.R. 1381	April 6, 2011	George Miller (D-CA)	57	Died in committee
112th Congress	Keeping All Students Safe Act	S. 2020	December 16, 2011	Tom Harkin (D-IA)	0	Died in committee
113th Congress	Keeping All Students Safe Act	H.R. 1893	May 8, 2013	George Miller (D-CA)	66	Died in committee
113th Congress	Keeping All Students Safe Act	S. 2036	February 24, 2014	Tom Harkin (D-IA)	4	Died in committee
114th Congress	Keeping All Students Safe Act	H.R. 927	February 12, 2015	Don Beyer (D-VA)	42	Died in committee
115th Congress	Keeping All Students Safe Act	H.R. 7124	November 14, 2018	Don Beyer (D-VA)	40	Died in committee
115th Congress	Keeping All Students Safe Act	S. 3626	November 14, 2018	Chris Murphy (D-CT)	3	Died in committee
116th Congress	Keeping All Students Safe Act	H.R. 8782	November 19, 2020	Don Beyer (D-VA)	81	Died in committee
116th Congress	Keeping All Students Safe Act	S. 4924	November 30, 2020	Chris Murphy (D-CT)	15	Died in committee
117th Congress	Keeping All Students Safe Act	H.R. 3474	May 25, 2021	Don Beyer (D-VA)	92	Referred to Education and Labor and Armed Services
117th Congress	Keeping All Students Safe Act	S. 1858	May 26, 2021	Chris Murphy (D-CT)	14	Referred to Health, Education, Labor and Pensions

Restraint involves immobilizing an individual and preventing them from moving their arms, legs, body, or head freely. Seclusion involves the involuntary confinement of an individual in a room or area from which the individual is physically prevented from leaving, whether the room is locked or the door is blocked by furniture.

In 2009, the United States Government Accountability Office (GAO) undertook a nationwide study of the use of restraint and seclusion in schools and its effects. The GAO found "hundreds of cases of alleged abuse and death related to the use of these methods on schoolchildren during the past two decades." Most of the incidents involved children with disabilities who were enrolled in special education, the GAO reported.

The GAO documented 20 deaths of children from restraint. The GAO also reported about restraints that resulted in broken arms, and kindergartners who were tied to chairs with duct tape and who suffered bloody noses. One teenager hanged himself in a seclusion room, while a teacher sat outside the room. Before the final episode, he was confined 19 times in a concrete 8 foot by 8 foot room for an average of 94 minutes each time. His parents were never informed. The GAO found that a New York child was placed alone in a seclusion room 75 times in 6 months for whistling and slouching. The National Disability Rights Network and the Council of Parents Attorneys and Advocates also documented the nationwide use of restraint and seclusion in 2009. NDRN documented the use of restraint and seclusion in 2/3 of states in 2009.

On May 19, 2009, the House Education and Labor Committee held hearings about the use of restraint and seclusion, chaired by Congressman George Miller.

One witness testified that her 14-year-old son was killed when restrained by his 230-pound teacher, who smothered him by lying on top of him in a restraint during a disagreement about lunch. Another witness testified that her 7-year-old daughter was bruised when she was restrained face down for playing with her tooth, but the parent was never informed by the school. She also testified that her child was later restrained again, and received a severe abrasion, but she was not informed of the restraint. She testified that other children were denied access to food, water, and the bathroom while isolated in seclusion confinement rooms.

The GAO presented testimony about its report and findings about restraint and seclusion, and the risk of death and injury. The GAO also reported that restraint and seclusion have been used to control minor student misbehaviors such as speaking out of turn or refusing to remain in one's chair. Another hearing witness testified that restraint may be needed in emergencies. He noted that sometimes educators need to use restraint in emergency situations, where there is a risk that a child will injure themself or others and nothing else will work to prevent the immediate danger. Teachers may use restraint and seclusion appropriately in those circumstances, the witness testified. An Illinois State Board of Education representative presented data from Illinois showing that implementing school-wide positive behavioral supports reduced the use of restraint and seclusion significantly.

The United States House of Representatives reported that children, most often children with disabilities, are subjected to seclusion and restraint at much higher rates than adults, and are at greater risk of injury as a result of these practices. The House further reported that children under the age of 12 are restrained or secluded at higher rates than any other age group. The House of Representatives also reported that, "the use of restraint and seclusion often exacerbates the behaviors that staff are trying to eliminate."

Because there is no federal law, state restraint and seclusion laws control. A 2012 report by Jessica Butler for the Autism National Committee summarized state seclusion and restraint laws and policies. It reported that only 14 states limited the use of restraint to emergencies involving threats of physical injury. Only 11 either banned all forms of seclusion or restricted it to emergency threats of physical harm. There are 27 states that have no requirement to notify parents when a child is restrained or secluded and only 12 states that require same day or next day notification.

As there is no national clearinghouse that gathers data on the use of the techniques, the exact number of children subjected to restraint and seclusion in school is unknown. The GAO found that only five states kept records. In two of them, Texas and California, there were over 33,000 cases in 2007–08. Many of the children had cognitive disabilities, autism, mental health disabilities, attention deficit disorder and other disabilities. Professor Reece Peterson testified at the House Education and Labor hearing about the need for federal law requiring data collection nationwide.

On December 9, 2009, six months after the House hearing, the first national restraint and seclusion bill was introduced by Congressman George Miller. It was cosponsored by Congresswoman Cathy McMorris Rodgers. A companion bill was introduced in the Senate by Senator Chris Dodd.

The 2009 House bill was numbered H.R. 4247 and entitled "Preventing Harmful Restraint and Seclusion in Schools Act." The Senate bill was numbered S. 2860 and had the same title.

On March 3, 2010, the House of Representatives passed H.R. 4247 (now renamed the Keeping All Students Safe Act). The vote was 262–153, with 238 Democrats and 24 Republicans voting in favor. The bill did not pass the Senate. A revised Senate bill, S.3895, was introduced on September 29, 2010, and cosponsored by Senator Dodd and Senator Burr. It did not pass the Senate. Because passage by both houses of Congress is required for the President to consider a bill in America, both bills died at the end of the 111th Congress in December 2010.

Restraint and seclusion bills were introduced again in the 112th Congress in 2011. On April 6, 2011, Congressman George Miller (D-CA), Ranking Member of the House Education and Workforce Committee, reintroduced the Keeping All Students Safe Act, cosponsored by Congressman Greg Harper (R-MS). On December 16, 2011, the second anniversary of Congressman Miller's first bill, Senator Tom Harkin, Chairman of the Senate Health Education Labor and Pensions Committee, introduced a slightly different version of the Keeping All Students Safe Act, S. 2020.

== Description of the Keeping All Students Safe Act ==
This section of the article focuses on the two newest bills introduced in the 112th Congress in 2011. The House and Senate versions of the Keeping All Students Safe Act differ.

The House bill prohibits physical restraint except in emergencies when there is an imminent threat of physical injury and less restrictive measures will not resolve the situation. The Senate bill bars physical restraint unless there is an immediate threat of serious bodily injury and less restrictive measures will not solve the situation. Both bills would forbid the use of restraint or seclusion for destruction of property, educational disruption, failing to follow instructions, and for coercion, discipline, or in place of proper educational planning.

The House bill also forbids seclusion unless there is an immediate threat of physical injury and less restrictive methods will not resolve the situation. The House bill will require staff to continuously visually monitor (watch) children who are confined to seclusion rooms to ensure that they are safe. The Senate bill bans all seclusion of children, which is defined as locking children in rooms or other spaces or blocking the door so they cannot leave (e.g., with furniture).

Both bills require restraint to end when the emergency ends, and the House bill requires seclusion to end when the emergency ends. Both bills ban the use of mechanical restraints, meaning devices that lock and restrain children, or taping or tying them to chairs or furniture. Both bills ban chemical restraints and restraints that impair breathing or otherwise threaten life.

Both bills require schools to notify parents in writing within 24 hours of restraint and verbally the same day. There are 27 states that do not have legal requirements for schools to tell parents a child was restrained/secluded.

Both bills impose training requirements to ensure that staff who use restraint and seclusion are trained in evidence-based techniques and that the techniques are not misused in even more dangerous manners. Both bills prohibit putting physical restraint as a planned intervention in Individual Education Programs, 504 plans, behavioral intervention plans, student safety plans, or other educational planning documents for individual students. The bills also require the collection of data nationwide and disaggregating the data by such categories as race, sex, income, and disability status.

The Senate bill also bans restraints that interfere with the ability to communicate. The GAO reported on at least four cases in which verbal children who died or were injured in restraint told staff that they could not breathe. Numerous children cannot speak or have difficulty doing so, and rely on sign language or augmentative communications devices. Additionally, the Senate bill requires that a debriefing be held, where school staff, the parents, and the student may attend. Debriefings are intended to reduce and eliminate restraint and seclusion, by determining what caused the event and how to avoid it in the future, and by analyzing, planning for, and implementing positive interventions.

== Statement of Congressman Miller on introduction ==
When Congressman Miller re-introduced the House bill in 2011, he described his reasons for doing so, "In 2009, the Government Accountability Office told our committee of the shocking wave of abuse by untrained school staff who were misusing emergency interventions. Most of these victims were children with disabilities. Some were 3 and 4 years old. In some cases, children died. Restraint and seclusion should be used only as a last resort and by trained professionals, but the GAO found that was not the case. . . . A media report out yesterday highlights that these horrific abuses continued through this past year. In Chicago, a 4-year-old boy's wrists were taped together with painter's tape and then duct tape because he refused to take a nap and he didn't wash his hands."

== Statement of Senator Harkin on Introduction ==
Senator Harkin introduced his bill and explained the reasons for doing so. He said, "I am pleased to introduce today the Keeping All Students Safe Act. This important legislation will protect school children against ineffective harmful and life threatening seclusion and restraint practices. . . . Restraint and seclusion-related fatalities and injuries most often involve children with disabilities. This vulnerable population must especially be protected from this type of abuse, and this legislation seeks to do just that. . . .The act does allow for the use of restraint in emergency situations to prevent serious bodily injury to the student, other students in the classroom, or staff, it also requires State-approved crisis intervention training program as to how to approach these types of emergency situations."

Senator Harkin also addressed data issues, "Another issue uncovered by the GAO study was that no web site, Federal agency, or other entity currently collects comprehensive data related to the use of restraint and seclusion in our Nation's schools. This Act will remedy this situation, as it requires each State educational agency to prepare and submit a report documenting" the use of restraint and seclusion."

== Related events ==
In March 2012, the Office of Civil Rights of the United States Department of Education presented a report about its Civil Rights Data Collection. It reported that students with disabilities made up 12% of students in its data collection sample, but nearly 70% of the students who are physically restrained by adults in school. For those schools which reported data, there was a total of 38,792 incidents of physical restraint. CRDC also found racial and ethnic disproportionality in restraint and seclusion use. African-American students were 21% of students with disabilities under served under the IDEA, but 44% of students with disabilities subjected to mechanical restraint. Hispanic children were disproportionately subjected to seclusion.
