= Disability Day of Mourning =

Annual filicide commemoration

The Disability Day of Mourning is observed annually on 1 March to commemorate disabled people who were murdered by their caregivers, especially their parents. First observed in 2012 and propagated by disability rights organizations such as Not Dead Yet and the Autistic Self Advocacy Network, the day aims to bring attention to the issue of filicide of disabled children and adults and the degree to which such murders are treated as different from or more socially acceptable than similar murders of abled people.

The day has become a significant part of the disability rights movement, attracting attention from politicians and the media. In addition to its pioneering by disability rights groups, it has gained attention and support amongst mainstream disability support-focused organizations.

== History ==
The Disability Day of Mourning was created in 2012 by Zoe Gross, director of advocacy at the Autistic Self Advocacy Network. However, the broader concept of vigils held to memorialise murdered disabled people originated in the early 2000s, itself as an extension of lists of murder victims passed around advocacy communities for years prior. The primary inciting incident for the day was the coverage of the murder of George Hodgins, a 22-year-old autistic man killed by his mother Elizabeth in a murder-suicide; mainstream news coverage focused on Elizabeth as a "devoted and loving" mother while treating George as a "low functioning and high maintenance" burden whose disability apparently justified his death.

The day also exists in part as a reaction to disability-related days that focus on the abled perspective, such as Disability Awareness Day, a pedagogical phenomenon where abled students use disability simulators to try and mimic the experience of being disabled (e.g., blindfolds to learn about the experience of blind people). Such simulations are controversial amongst disability rights activists due to their poor relationship with the lived experience of disabled people.

== Observance ==
The Disability Day of Mourning is observed on 1 March by holding vigils in cities worldwide and cataloguing disabled murder victims on disability rights websites. Many are held on college campuses, such as Syracuse University and the University of Maryland. Outside of the United States, vigils have been held in places such as Canada, Scotland, Australia, and China. In 2021, due to the impact of the COVID-19 pandemic, global vigils were held online.

The vigils feature the reading of names of murdered disabled people; due to the number of names, readings may be restricted only to those added to the list since the previous vigil. Many vigils also feature disabled survivors of abuse, such as lunatic asylum survivors, talking about their experiences. The Disability Memorial website collects a more complete list of names, stretching back to 1980. Other common aspects include a moment of silence and the lighting of candles. Another major focus is the media coverage of such murders, which frequently quotes friends and relatives of the murderers, and even other caregivers of disabled people, as being sympathetic to the crime. A particular focus is on the perception of bias relating to murders of disabled people, such as situations in which murder have been reduced to manslaughter with disability as a mitigating factor. According to statistics from the Ruderman Family Foundation, on average, one disabled person was murdered by a family member or caregiver each week in North America in 2011–2015; many of the murderers are acquitted or serve little to no prison time. Similarly, a paper by the Florida A&M University Law Review found approximately half of all filicides were "altruistic", or motivated by the parental belief that killing their child was necessarily to 'end suffering'; these murders were primarily of disabled children.

The primary organization involved in the day is the Autistic Self Advocacy Network, and the day was initially organized by its members. However, people of many disabilities, not just autism, organize and attend these events. Other organizations involved in popularising and hosting events include Not Dead Yet, the Center for Disability Rights, the National Council on Independent Living, and the Disability Rights Education and Defense Fund.

== Impact ==
When Gross first originated the Disability Day of Mourning concept, she was surprised to receive pushback, with opponents describing the concept as "anti-parent" and as stigmatizing towards the parents of disabled children. Over time, the perception of the day has grown more positive. In 2016, the White House liaison to the disability community read a statement from then-President Barack Obama at the Washington D.C. event.

The Autistic Self Advocacy Network provides an "Anti-Filicide Toolkit", which aims to prevent murders of disabled children and adults and to offer ways to discuss such murders if they happen in a reader's community. The Disability Day of Mourning has popularised usage of the term filicide, the word for the murder of one's child, to refer to disability-related murders by family members or caregivers.

The existence of the day, and the murders that cause it to exist, have been discussed as a sign of the pervasive nature of ableism. For instance, the necessity of the day was discussed in the reception to Sia's controversial film Music, about an autistic girl, and the scenes of the character being physically restrained against her will – something that has resulted in the deaths of many disabled and autistic people.

Since the origin of the day, media coverage of disabled people has become more positive, and self-advocacy in such coverage – with disabled writers discussing the disabled experience from an inside view – has become more common. The Disability Day of Mourning has been accepted by mainstream disability groups, such as Arc and Easter Seals.

== See also ==
- Matthew Shepard and James Byrd Jr. Hate Crimes Prevention Act, the first United States hate crime legislation to include disability as a protected class
- Euthanasia
- Death of Max Benson
- Tracy Latimer
