= Crisis intervention =

Intervention for immediate personal crisis stabilization

Crisis intervention is a time-limited intervention with a specific psychotherapeutic approach to immediately stabilize those in crisis.

== Cross-national approaches ==
Across different countries, crisis intervention following mass trauma events such as natural disasters relies on trained professionals who provide immediate support, coping strategies, and resource coordination to help individuals navigate psychological distress. Intervention process often begins with an assessment. In countries such as the Czech Republic, crisis intervention is an individual therapy, usually lasting four to six weeks, and includes assistance with housing, food, and legal matters. Long waiting times for resident psychotherapists and in Germany, explicit exclusions of couples therapy and other therapies complicate implementation. In the United States, licensed professional counselors (LPCs) provide mental health care to those in need. Licensed professional counselors focus on psychoeducational techniques to prevent a crisis, consultation to individuals, and research effective therapeutic treatment to deal with stressful environments.

== Crisis and Intervention ==
A crisis can have physical or psychological effects. Usually significant and more widespread, the latter lacks the former's obvious signs, complicating diagnosis. It is defined as a breakdown of psychological equilibrium, and being unable to benefit from normal methods of coping. Three factors define crisis: negative events, feelings of hopelessness, and unpredictable events. People who experience a crisis perceive it as a negative event that generate physical emotion, pain, or both. They also feel helpless, powerless, trapped, and a loss of control over their lives. Crisis events tend to occur suddenly and without warning, leaving little time to respond and resulting in trauma.

In intervention for individuals facing personal or societal crises, there are five universal principles to guide the process. Prompt intervention is essential as victims are initially at high risk for maladaptive coping or immobilization. Stabilization involves mobilizing resources to help victims regain a sense of order and normalcy, promoting independent functioning. Comprehension of the traumatic event is facilitated to aid the individual in understanding and expressing their feelings about the experience. Problem-solving is a crucial aspect where counselors assist victims in resolving issues within their unique circumstances, promoting self-efficacy and self-reliance. Lastly, the goal is to help individuals return to normalcy by actively facilitating problem-solving, supporting the development of appropriate coping strategies, and assisting in their implementation. This approach aims to empower individuals to regain independence and resilience.

== Critical incident debriefing ==
Critical incident debriefing is a widespread approach to support those who experienced crisis. This technique is done in a group setting 24–72 hours after the event occurred, and is typically a one-time meeting that lasts 3–4 hours, but can be done over numerous sessions if needed. Debriefing is a process by which facilitators describe various symptoms related PTSD and other anxiety disorders that individuals are likely to experience due to exposure to a trauma. The group setting allows participants to process negative emotions surrounding the traumatic event collectively in a safe environment. Facilitators also guide participants through techniques that involve active cognitive engagement while introducing attentional tasks that may serve to distract and ground individuals as they recount distressing experiences, allowing for less stressful emotional processing.

However, critical incident debriefing has been the subject of substantial academic criticism regarding its effectiveness in reducing the impact of harm from crisis situations. Some studies show that individuals exposed to debriefing are actually more likely to exhibit symptoms of PTSD at a 13-month follow-up than those who received no intervention. Most recipients of debriefing reported that they found the intervention helpful. However, further studies found that individuals who received no debriefing intervention also reported improvement, and the reported improvement with intervention was considered a misattribution, as the progress may reflect a natural recovery process rather than the effects of the intervention itself.

== Models of Crisis Intervention ==
=== SAFER-R ===
The SAFER-R Model, with Roberts 7 Stage Crisis Intervention Model, is model of intervention much used by law enforcement. The model approaches crisis intervention as an instrument to help the client to achieve their baseline level of functioning from the state of crisis. This intervention model for responding to individuals in crisis consists of 5+1 stages.

They are:

1. Stabilize
2. Acknowledge
3. Facilitate understanding
4. Encourage adaptive coping
5. Restore functioning or,
6. Refer

The SAFER-R model can be used in conjunction with the Assessment Crisis Intervention Trauma Treatment. ACT is a 7-stage crisis intervention model. This model, along with the SAFER-R model, is used to restore one's mental state, but it is also used to prevent any trauma that may occur psychologically during a crisis. It can also help experts determine a solution for those who suffer from mental illness. The seven stages/steps are:

1. Assess: Evaluate lethality and establish rapport with the client.
2. Explore: Identify the crisis situation and empower the client to share their story.
3. Understand: Develop a conceptualization of the client's coping style.
4. Confront: Address feelings, explore emotions, and challenge maladaptive coping.
5. Solutions: Collaboratively explore coping alternatives and educate the client.
6. Plan: Develop a concrete treatment plan, empowering the client and finding meaning.
7. Follow-Up: Arrange for post-crisis evaluation, and potential booster sessions to prevent relapse or recidivism.

The crisis intervention stage of Roberts' ACT model aims to resolve the client's present problems, stress, psychological trauma, and emotional conflicts using a time-limited and goal-directed approach with minimal contacts. It involves a seven-step process, including assessing the situation, building rapport, exploring the crisis, empowering the client, understanding coping styles, confronting feelings, challenging maladaptive coping, exploring solutions, educating on coping strategies, developing a concrete treatment plan, and arranging follow-up for ongoing evaluation and support.

Other models include Lerner and Shelton's 10 step acute stress & trauma management protocol. They are:

1. Assess: Evaluate danger/safety for all parties involved.
2. Mechanisms: Consider physical and perceptual injury mechanisms, evaluating whether a person has been hurt or has experienced harm to their body or senses.
3. Responsive: Evaluate the victim's level of responsiveness.
4. Medical: Address any medical needs.
5. Signs: Identify signs of traumatic stress in the individual.
6. Introduce: Build rapport by introducing oneself and establishing a connection.
7. Story: Allow the person to share their story for grounding. Grounding in crisis intervention refers to a practice that helps individuals deal with distressing feelings by refocusing their thoughts on the present moment, utilizing both physical and mental techniques to soothe stress and reduce symptoms of trauma.
8. Support: Provide empathetic listening and support.
9. Normalize: Validate emotions, stress, and adaptive coping styles.
10. Future: Bring the person to the present, describe future events, and provide referrals.

Lerner and Shelton's ten-step acute stress and trauma management protocol provides a comprehensive approach to treating trauma. The steps involve assessing danger/safety, addressing physical and perceptual injury, evaluating responsiveness, providing medical care, identifying signs of traumatic stress, building rapport, grounding through storytelling, offering support, normalizing emotions and coping styles, and helping the person focus on the present and future with necessary referrals. The aim is to eliminate stress symptoms and treat the traumatic experience after crisis interventions and assessments have been carried out.

== Crisis Intervention Practices ==
=== School-based ===
The primary goal of school-based crisis intervention is to help restore the crisis-exposed student's basic problem-solving abilities and in doing so, to return the student to their pre-crisis levels of functioning. Crisis intervention services are indirect. People often find school psychologists working behind the scenes, ensuring that students, staff, and parents are well-positioned to realize their natural potential to overcome the crisis. School psychologists are trained professionals who meet continuing education requirements after receiving their degree. They help maintain a safe and supportive learning environment for students by working with other staff, such as school resource officers, law enforcement officers trained as informal counselors, and mentors.

At a school-based level, when a trauma occurs, like a student death, school psychologists are trained to prevent and respond to crisis through the PREPaRE Model of Crisis Response, developed by NASP. PREPaRE provides educational professionals training in roles based on their participation in school safety and crisis teams. PREPaRE is one of the first comprehensive nationally available training curriculums developed by school-based professionals with firsthand experience and formal training.

=== Mobile Crisis Team Intervention ===
Mobile Crisis Response teams (MCR) offer intervention to individuals that are experiencing a mental health crisis somewhere within the community including but not limited to their school, work or home. For safety purposes it is important that two people go out together to assess the individual who experiencing a crisis. MCRS support Emergency medical services (EMS) and work together to come up with the best solution for the person who is experiencing a crisis.

In many countries police negotiators will be called to respond to those experiencing a mental health crisis, particularly where suicide is a risk. However offers of help are frequently rejected in these situations, because they have not been directly sought by the person in crisis, who wants to maintain a level of independence. Supporting those in crisis to make independent decisions and adapting terminology, for example using the phrase ‘sort (x) out’ can aid in minimising resistance to the help being offered.

== Criticism ==
When using crisis intervention methods for the disabled individual, every effort should first be made to first find other, preventative methods, such as giving adequate physical, occupational and speech therapy, and communication aides including sign language and augmentative communication systems, behavior and other plans, to first help that individual to be able to express their needs and function better. Crisis intervention methods including restraining holds are sometimes used without first giving the disabled more and better therapies or educational assistance. Often school districts, for example, may use crisis prevention holds and "interventions" against disabled children without first giving services and supports: at least 75% of cases of restraint and seclusion reported to the U.S. Department of Education in the 2011–12 school year involved disabled children. Also, school districts hide their disabled child's restraint or seclusion from the parents, denying the child and their family the opportunity to recover. In the U.S., Congress, with bipartisan support, has proposed bills such as the "Keeping All Students Safe Act" to legislate restrictions on the use of restraint and seclusion in school districts.

== See also ==
- Mental health first aid
- Psychological first aid
- Suicide prevention
- Mobile Crisis

== Sources ==
- Greenstone, J.L. & Leviton, Sharon. (1993, 2002,2011). Elements of crisis intervention: Crises and how to respond to them, Third Edition. Pacific Grove, CA: Brooks/Cole Publishing Company, Thomson Learning.
- Greenstone, J.L. (2005). The elements of police hostage and crisis negotiations: Critical incidents and how to respond to them. Binghamton, New York: The Haworth Press, Inc.
- Greenstone, J.L.(2008). The Elements of disaster Psychology: Managing psychosocial trauma – An integrated approach to force protection and acute care. Springfield, Illinois: Charles C. Thomas, Publishers.
- Greenstone, J.L. & Leviton, Sharon (1981). Hotline: Crisis intervention directory. New York: Facts on File.
- Greenstone, J.L. & Leviton, Sharon (1982). Crisis intervention: Handbook for interveners. Dubuque: Kendall-Hunt.
- Greenstone, J.L.& Leviton, Sharon. (1983). Crisis intervention. In Raymond Corsini (ED) Encyclopedia of Psychology. New York: John Wiley and Sons.
