= Seclusion and restraint practices in the U.S. education system =

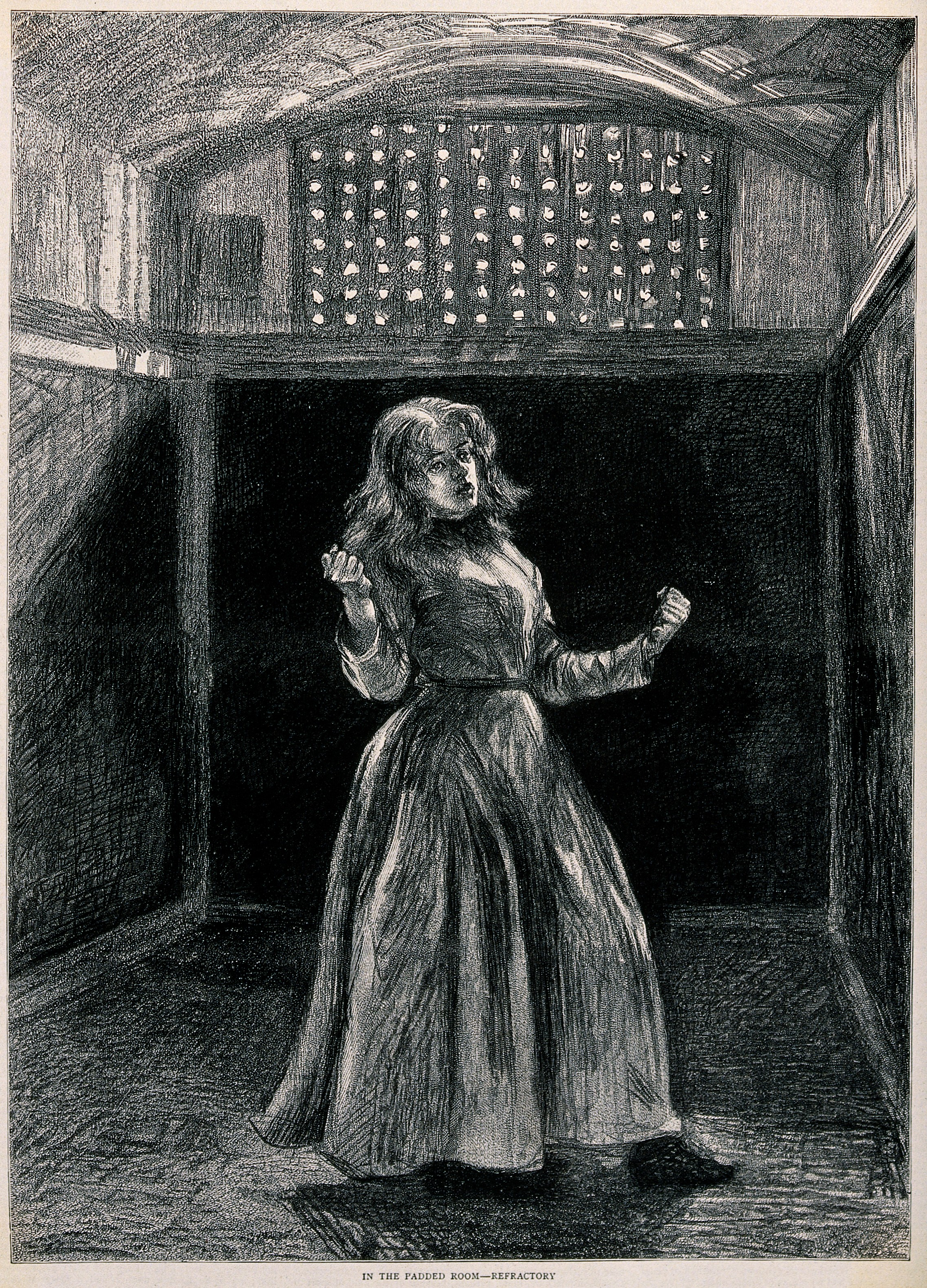
Woman in padded cell/seclusion room

Restraint and seclusion is a highly controversial practice in the special education system involving holding students down physically or involuntarily locking students in seclusion rooms. In United States public schools, the practices of restraint and seclusion are not regulated on the federal level. All but four of the 50 U.S. states have regulations on portions of these practices.

== Misuse of restraint and seclusion ==
Seclusion and restraint are often misused in both public and private schools, causing severe injury and trauma for students. Restraint and seclusion are often used as punishment for minor behavioral problems. These issues have caused people to call the practices a human rights issue, disability rights issue, children's and youth rights issue, and civil rights issue. In a 2015 recorded surveillance video in Maryland, an 8-year-old was dragged by 3 staff members into a seclusion room/padded cell with no windows. After the door had been opened he was found laying in his own blood. His mother had called it a battle between adults and a child and said "I challenge the experts to show us anywhere how this helps the behavior. How this isn’t traumatizing. Because you can’t. There is no positive thing that comes from this," Linda said. "It doesn't change behavior. It re-traumatizes children. And it opens them up to injuries and all other kinds of things. Why are you continuing to do this?"

== Types of rooms for seclusion ==
Seclusion can occur in any room someone can be locked alone in. Most fit the definition for padded cells. While most seclusion rooms could be called padded cells, not all are padded.

=== Types of seclusion room ===
- small padded rooms
- utility closets
- padded cells
- areas blocked off with gym mats
- empty administrative offices

== Practices ==
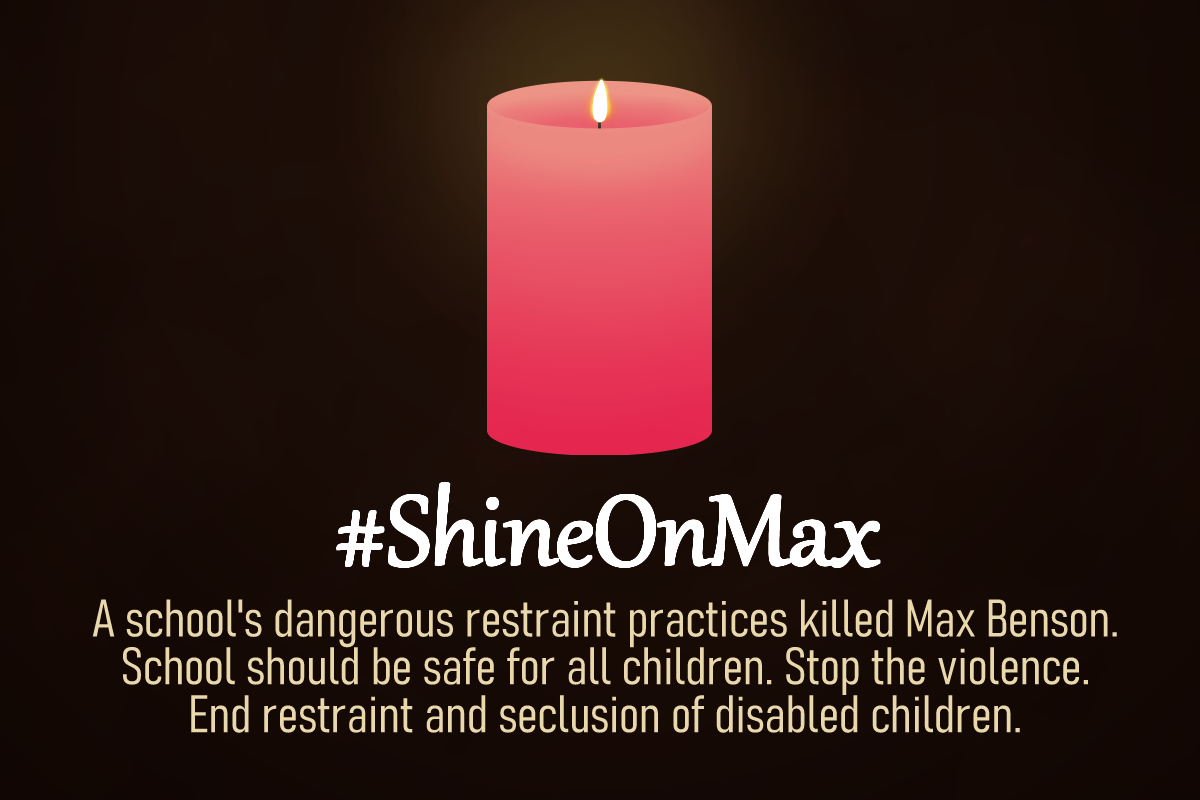
Poster protesting the school practices, relating to the death of Max Benson

Restraints are defined by the U.S. Department of Education as "a personal restriction that immobilizes or reduces the ability of a student to move his or her torso, arms, legs, or head freely".

Prone restraints are a practice where students are physically held, face-down, on the floor.

Seclusion is defined by the Department of Education as "the involuntary confinement of a student alone in a room or area from which the student is physically prevented from leaving".

== Legality by state ==
Although these practices are not regulated at the federal level, federal guidelines suggest these practices should never be used except if a student's behavior "poses imminent danger of serious physical harm to self or others".

=== Connecticut ===
Restraint and seclusion are legal in Connecticut. The acts were recorded to have taken place tens of thousands of times per year for over a decade, especially to Black students and students with autism. A bill introduced in 2023, SB 1200, would replace seclusion with a time-out in an unlocked room and limit when restraint is allowed.

=== New York ===
In 2024, the Salmon River Central School District in upstate New York was investigated after photos revealed wooden “timeout boxes” in classrooms, raising concerns that the structures constituted prohibited seclusion, particularly for students with disabilities. The district removed the boxes, placed multiple administrators on leave, and faced condemnation from state officials and the Saint Regis Mohawk Tribal Council, highlighting the legal ban on seclusion and its disproportionate harm to marginalized students.

=== Vermont ===
Prone restraints are permitted in Vermont, though strictly limited. In 2022, Harwood Union Unified School District put a temporary halt to the practice while a task force would examine the district's use of the tactics.

=== Summary of state laws ===
State laws on seclusion and restraint:

State laws	Regulation against use	Seclusion ban	Prone restraint ban	Mechanical restraint ban	Chemical restraint ban
Alabama	Partial	Partial	check	check	check
Alaska	Partial	Partial	check	check	check
Arizona	Partial	Partial	check	Partial	Partial
Arkansas	Partial	Partial	check	check	check
California	Partial	Partial	check	Partial	Partial
Colorado	Partial	Partial	(Note: Colorado is unique among states in defining prone restrains as lasting more than five minutes, unless it is in the prone position.)	check	check
Connecticut	Partial	Partial	check	Partial	Partial
Delaware	Partial	check	check	Partial	check
District of Columbia	Partial	Partial	check	Partial	Partial
Florida	Partial	check	Partial	check	Partial
Georgia	check	check	check	check	check
Hawaii	check	check	check	check	check
Idaho	☒	☒	☒	☒	☒
Illinois	Partial	Partial	check	check	check
Indiana	Partial	Partial	Partial	check	check
Iowa	Partial	Partial	check	check	check
Kansas	Partial	Partial	check	check	check
Kentucky	Partial	Partial	check	check	check
Louisiana	Partial	Partial	Partial	check	Partial
Maine	Partial	Partial	check	check	check
Maryland	Partial	Partial (Note: Banned in public schools and limited in non-public schools.)	check	check	Partial
Massachusetts	check	check	check	check	check
Michigan	Partial	Partial	check	check	check
Minnesota	Partial	Partial	check	Partial	Partial
Mississippi	Partial	Partial	check	check	check
Missouri	Partial	Partial	check	Partial	(Note: State officials "would not recommend" the use of chemical restraints, but have not banned the practice.)
Montana	Partial	Partial	Partial	check	Partial
Nebraska	☒	☒	☒	☒	☒
Nevada	Partial	check	Partial	Partial	Partial
New Hampshire	Partial	Partial	check	check	check
New Jersey	Partial	Partial	Partial	Partial	Partial
New Mexico	Partial	Partial	check	Partial	Partial
New York	Partial	check	Partial	Partial	Partial
North Carolina	Partial	Partial	Partial	Partial	Partial
North Dakota (Note: A spokesperson for the North Dakota Department of Public Instruction stated: "North Dakota has no state laws or regulations about the use of restraint or seclusion in schools. The North Dakota Legislature has [repeatedly] declined to approve bills on this subject. ... [There is] a North Dakota School Boards Association suggested policy on restraint and seclusion which many of our school districts have adopted. The existence of the School Boards Association’s suggested policy on seclusion and restraint, and the fact that many districts have adopted it, has been used in the Legislature as a reason not to adopt a state law on the same subject. A School Boards Association manual that includes the suggested policy raises this point. 'One way to preserve local control of the restraint or seclusion policy is to demonstrate to lawmakers that North Dakota schools have, on their own, adopted restraint and seclusion policies that contain reasonable and practical protections for students and staff,' the statement says.")	☒	☒	☒	☒	☒
Ohio	Partial	Partial	check	check	check
Oklahoma	Partial	Partial	check	check	check
Oregon	Partial	Partial	check	check	check
Pennsylvania	Partial	check	check	Partial	Partial
Rhode Island	Partial	Partial	Partial	Partial	check
South Carolina	☒	☒	☒	☒	☒
South Dakota	Partial	Partial	check	Partial	Partial
Tennessee	Partial	Partial	check	check	check
Texas	Partial	Partial	check	Partial	check
Utah	Partial	Partial	check	check	check
Vermont	Partial	Partial	check	check	check
Virginia	Partial	Partial	check	check	check
Washington	Partial	Partial	check	Partial	Partial
West Virginia	Partial	check	check	check	Partial
Wisconsin	Partial	Partial	Partial	check	check
Wyoming	Partial	Partial	check	check	Partial

== See also ==
- Padded cell
- School detention, a more lenient form of punishment
