= Special education =

Educating students with special needs

Special education, also called SPED, special ed, aided education, alternative provision, exceptional student education, or special day class (SDC), is the practice of educating students in a way that accommodates their individual differences, disabilities, and special needs. This involves the individually planned and systematically monitored arrangement of teaching procedures, adapted equipment and materials, and accessible settings. These interventions are designed to help individuals with special needs achieve a higher level of personal self-sufficiency and success in school and in their community. This may not be available if the student were given only access to typical classroom education.

Special education aims to provide accommodated education for students with disabilities such as learning disabilities or difficulties (such as dyslexia), communication disorders, emotional and behavioral disorders, physical disabilities (such as osteogenesis imperfecta, down syndrome, and muscular dystrophy), developmental disabilities (such as autism spectrum disorder, and intellectual disabilities) and other disabilities. Students with disabilities are likely to benefit from additional educational services such as different approaches to teaching, the use of technology, a specifically adapted teaching area, a resource room, or a separate classroom altogether.

In the Western world, educators modify teaching methods, curriculum materials, and environments so that the maximum number of students are served in general education environments. Integration can reduce social stigmas and improve academic achievement for many students.

== Different kinds of education ==
Gifted education is sometimes confused with special education. Gifted education is tailored to intellectual giftedness, which is a difference in learning. These students can also benefit from specialized teaching techniques or different educational programs, but the term "special education" is generally used to specifically indicate instruction of students with disabilities.

Whereas special education is designed specifically for students with learning disabilities, remedial education can be designed for any students, with or without special needs. The defining trait is simply that they have reached a point of unpreparedness, regardless of why. For example, a person's education may have been disrupted by internal displacement during civil disorder or a war.

The opposite of special education is general education, also known as mainstream education. General education is the standard curriculum presented without special teaching methods or supports. Sometimes special education classrooms and general education classrooms mix. This is called an inclusive classroom.

== History ==
Back in the 1970s, children with cognitive, physical, or other disabilities were not ensured a seat in school. Often these children receive little to no education because majority of the time they were dismissed or neglected from the schools. And if they were accepted, they were separated from their classmates and put into different buildings, literally away from the other "normal" students. Over 7 million children with disabilities were omitted from public education. In 1975, the Individuals with Disabilities Education Act was passed by President Gerald Ford, protecting and educating children from 3-21 years old.

== Individual needs ==
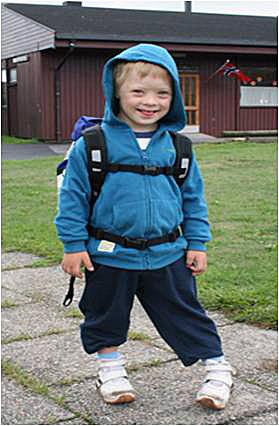
A six-year-old boy in Norway with Down syndrome is ready for his first day of school.

A special education program should be customized to address each student's needs. Special educators provide a continuum of services, in which students with various disabilities receive multiple degrees of support based on their individual needs. It is crucial for special education programs to be individualized so that they address the unique combination of needs of a given student.

In the United States, Canada, and the UK, educational professionals use a student's Individualized Education Program (IEP). Another name for a student's Individualized Education Plan is a student's Individual Learning Plan (ILP).

In the US, for children who are not yet three years old, an Individual Family Service Plan (IFSP) serves as the service document and, like an IEP, includes present levels of development and plans for services the child and family will receive.

Students with all forms of special needs are assessed to determine their specific strengths and weaknesses. The earlier these students with special needs are assessed, the faster they get the accommodations that they need, and the better it is for their education. Placement, resources, and goals are determined on the basis of the student's needs. Accommodations and modifications to the regular program may include changes in the curriculum, supplementary aids or equipment, and the provision of specialized physical adaptations that allow students to participate in the educational environment as much as possible. Students may need this help to access subject matter, physically gain access to the school, or meet their emotional needs. For example, if the assessment determines that the student cannot write by hand because of a physical disability, then the school might provide a computer for typing assignments, or allow the student to answer questions verbally instead. If the school determines that the student is severely distracted by the normal activities in a large, busy classroom, then the student might be placed in a smaller classroom such as a separate classroom or resource room.

== Methods of provision ==
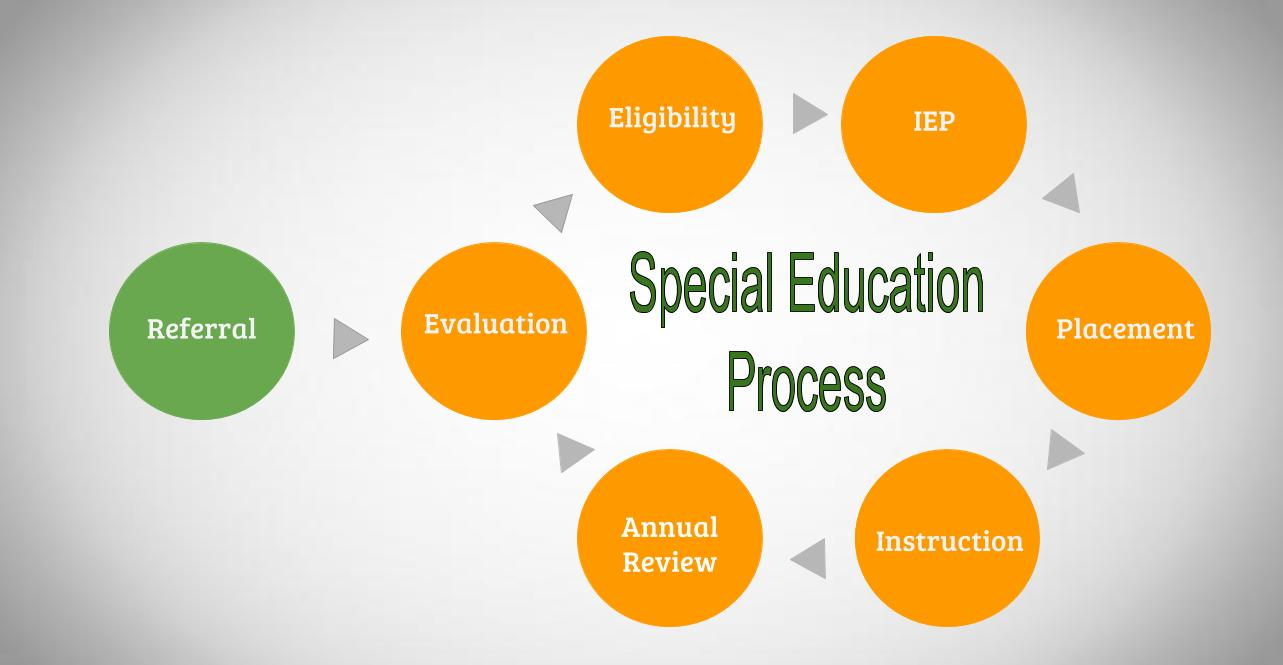
Procedure that a person must follow in order to receive special education accommodations

In most developed countries, schools use different approaches to providing special education services to students. These approaches can be broadly grouped into four categories, according to how much contact the student with special needs has with non-disabled students (using North American terminology):

- Inclusion: In this approach, students with special needs spend all, or most, of the school day with students who do not have special needs. Due to the fact that inclusion can require substantial modification of the general curriculum, most schools use it only for selected students with mild to moderate special needs, which is accepted as a best practice. Some of the modifications include a slow pace of instruction, more breaks, sensory toys, et cetera. Specialized services may be provided inside or outside the regular classroom, depending on the type of service. Students may occasionally leave the regular classroom to attend smaller, more intensive instructional sessions in separate classrooms usually referred to as "resource rooms". They may also receive other related services that require specialized equipment and would be disruptive to the rest of the class. Such services include speech and language therapy, occupational therapy, physical therapy, or rehabilitation counseling. They might also leave the regular classroom for services that require privacy, such as counseling sessions with a social worker.
- Mainstreaming refers to the practice of educating students with special needs in classes with non-disabled students during specific time periods. This is based on their skills. Students with special needs are segregated in separate classrooms exclusively for adapted education for the rest of the school day.
- Another method is segregation in a separate classroom or special school for students with special needs. In this model, students with special needs do not attend classes with non-disabled students. Segregated students may attend the same school where regular classes are provided, but they spend all instructional time exclusively in a separate classroom for students with various disabilities. If their special class is located in a typical school, they may be provided opportunities for social integration outside the classroom, such as by eating meals with students without disabilities. Alternatively, these students may attend a special school. It may also occur when a student is in a hospital, housebound, or detained by the criminal justice system. These students may receive one-on-one instruction or group instruction. Students who have been suspended or expelled are not considered segregated in this same sense.
- Co-teaching: In this setting, students with special needs are placed in a general education classroom to learn along with their disabled peers and non-disabled peers. A general education teacher and a special education teacher work as partners in instruction. Types of co-teaching include "one teaching/one helping" in which one teacher instructs while the other circulates around the class to evaluate and offer help, "parallel teaching" in which both teachers teach the same content to two groups of students of equal size, "station teaching" in which both teachers present differing content to different groups of students simultaneously and students rotate through each station, "alternative teaching" in which one teacher works with a smaller group or individual students while the other works with the rest of the class, or "team teaching" in which both teachers plan and teach a lesson together.
- Multi-Tiered System of Supports (MTSS) is an educational framework increasingly adopted to meet the academic, behavioral, and social-emotional needs of all students, including those receiving special education services. MTSS typically consists of three tiers of support:

Tier 1: High-quality, universal instruction for all students.

Tier 2: Targeted interventions for students at risk of academic or behavioral challenges.

Tier 3: Intensive, individualized support, often overlapping with special education services.

This approach promotes early identification of needs and reduces inappropriate referrals to special education by providing timely, data-driven support within general education settings. MTSS is also aligned with Response to Intervention (RTI) models and is increasingly integrated with Positive Behavioral Interventions and Supports (PBIS) to support inclusive practices across school systems.

=== Effective instruction for students with disabilities ===
- Goal-directed: Each child must have an Individualized Education Program (IEP) that distinguishes their particular needs. The child must get the services that are designed for them. These services will allow them to reach their annual goals which will be assessed at the end of each term along with short-term goals that will be assessed every few months.
- Research-based methods: A lot of research has been conducted on how best to teach students with disabilities. Testing, IQs, interviews, the discrepancy model, et cetera should all be used to determine where to place the child. Once that is determined, the next step is the best way for the child to learn. There are a number of different programs such as the Wilson Reading Program and Direct Instruction.
- Guided by student performance: While the IEP goals may be assessed every few months to a year, constant informal assessments must take place. These assessments will guide instruction for the teacher. The teacher will be able to determine if the material is too difficult or too easy.

=== Special schools ===
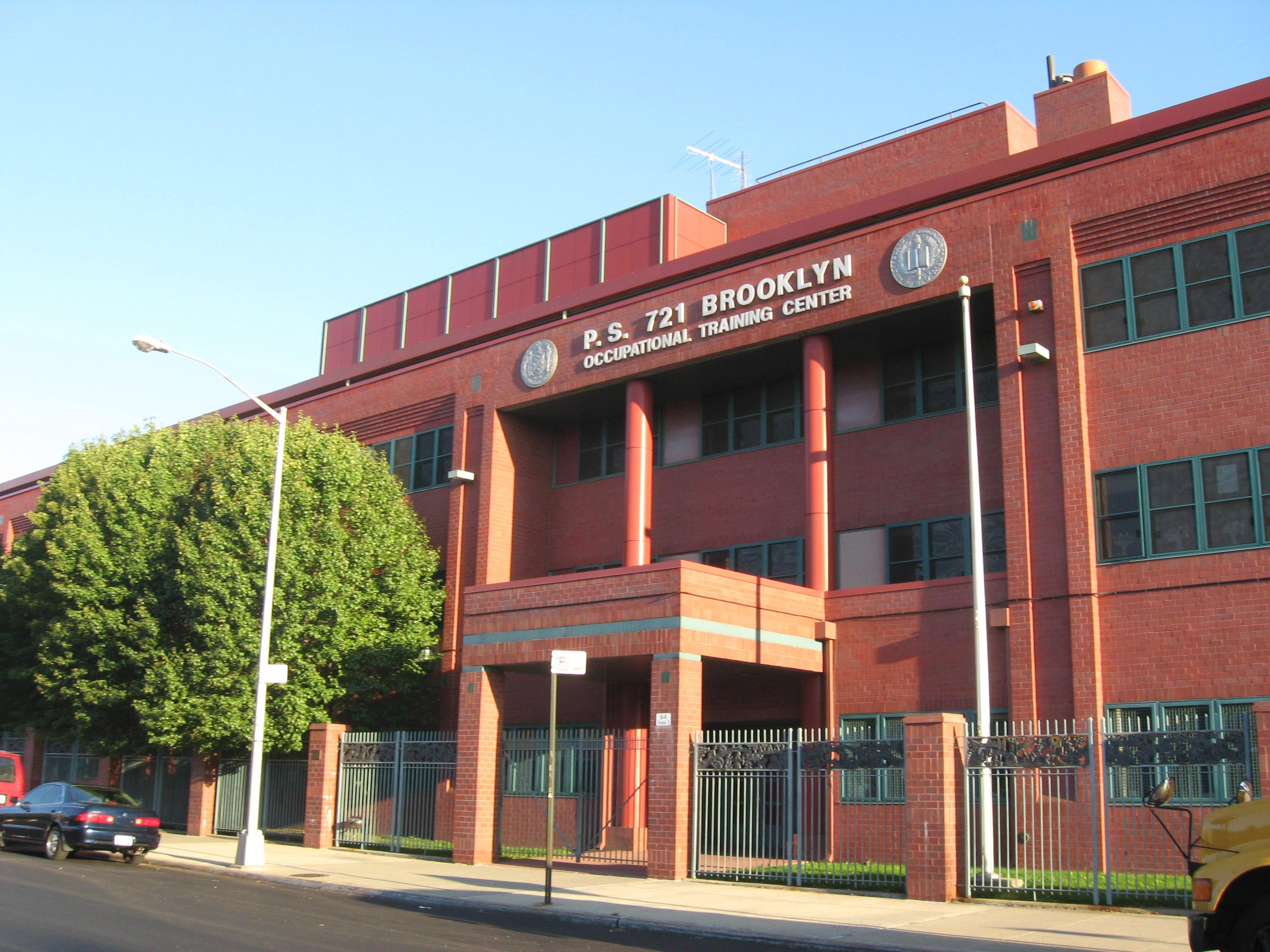
PS 721, a special school in Brooklyn, New York, exclusively for the education of students with special needs

A special school is a school catered for students who have special educational needs due to learning difficulties, physical disabilities, or behavioral problems. Special schools may be specifically designed, staffed, and resourced to provide appropriate special education for children with additional needs. Students attending special schools generally do not attend any classes in mainstream schools.

Special schools provide individualized education with the ability to address specific needs. Student to teacher ratios are kept low, often 6:1 or lower, depending upon the needs of the children. Special schools will also have other facilities for children with special needs, such as soft play areas, sensory rooms, or swimming pools, all of which are necessary for treating students with certain conditions.

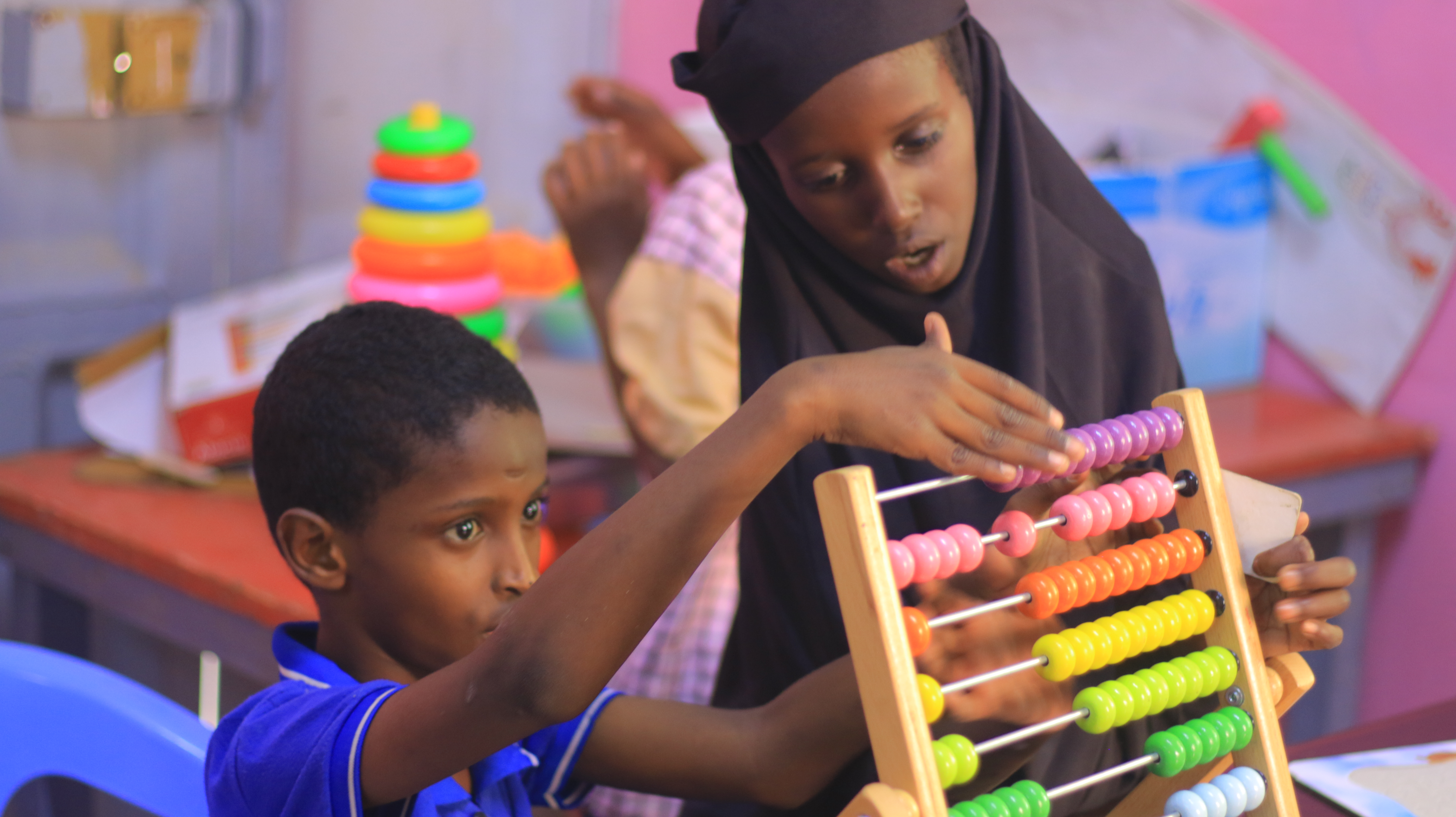
This school in Somalia serves children with autism, cerebral palsy, ADHD, and other special educational needs.

In recent times, places available in special schools are declining as more children with special needs are educated in mainstream schools. However, there will always be some children, whose learning needs cannot be appropriately met in a regular classroom setting and will require specialized education and resources to provide the level of support they require. An example of a disability that may require a student to attend a special school is intellectual disability. However, this practice is often frowned upon by school districts in the US in the light of the least restrictive environment as mandated in the Individuals with Disabilities Education Act.

An alternative is a special unit or special classroom, also called a self-contained classroom, which is a separate classroom dedicated solely to the education of students with special needs within a larger school that also provides general education. This classroom is typically staffed by a specially trained teacher, who provides specific, individualized instruction to individuals and small groups of students with special needs. Separate classrooms, because they are located in a general education school, may have students who remain in the separate classroom full-time, or students who are mainstreamed in certain general education classes. An alternative to the separate classroom full-time for a student would be a one-to-one aide in the general education setting. In the United States, a one-on-one aide for a student with a disability is called a paraprofessional. In the United States a part-time choice that is appropriate for some students is sometimes called a resource room. Another option would be attending a separate classroom for a specific subject such as social studies.

Seclusion is the practice of involuntarily locking a student in an isolated room, utility closet or office alone without the ability to leave until school staff allows. The use of a seclusion room is often misused as a form of punishment for disrespecting staff or leaving the classroom.

==== History of special schools ====
One of the first special schools in the world was the Institut National des Jeunes Aveugles in Paris, which was founded in 1784. It was the first school in the world to teach blind students. The first school in U.K. for the Deaf was established in 1760 in Edinburgh by Thomas Braidwood, with education for visually impaired people beginning in the Edinburgh and Bristol in 1765.

In the 19th century, people with disabilities and the inhumane conditions where they were supposedly housed and educated were addressed in the literature of Charles Dickens. Dickens characterized people with severe disabilities as having the same, if not more, compassion and insight in Bleak House and Little Dorrit.

Such attention to the downtrodden conditions of people with disabilities resulted in reforms in Europe including the re-evaluation of special schools. In the United States, reform came more slowly. Throughout the mid half of the 20th century, special schools, termed institutions, were not only accepted, but they were encouraged. Disabled students were housed with people with mental illnesses, and they were not educated much, if at all.

Deinstitutionalization proceeded in the US beginning in the 1970s following the exposes of the institutions. It has taken some time before the Education for All Handicapped Children's Act of 1974, Individuals with Disabilities Education Act (IDEA) and Individuals with Disabilities Educational Improvement Act (IDEIA) to come into fruition. School integration was supported as early as the 1970s, and teacher preparation programs in higher education have carefully taught and instructed graduates on inclusion at the individual, classroom, school, and district levels for decades resulting in dual certification of "regular teachers".

With the Amendments to the Individuals with Disabilities Education Act of 1997, school districts in the United States began to slowly integrate students with moderate and severe special needs into regular school systems. This changed the form and function of special education services in many school districts and special schools subsequently saw a steady decrease in enrollment as districts weighed the cost per student. It also posed general funding dilemmas to certain local schools and districts, changed how schools viewed assessments, and formally introduced the concept of inclusion to many educators, students and parents.

== Instructional strategies ==
The student can be taught in either a classroom or outside environment. Both environments can be interactive for the student to engage better with the subject. Different instructional techniques are used for some students with special educational needs. Instructional strategies are classified as being either accommodations or modifications.

=== Accommodation ===
An accommodation is a reasonable adjustment to teaching practices so that the student learns the same material, but in a format that is more accessible to the student. Accommodations may be classified by whether they change the presentation, response, setting, or scheduling of lessons. For example, the school may accommodate a student with visual impairments by providing a large-print textbook. This is a presentation accommodation.

Examples of accommodations

- Response accommodations: typing homework assignments rather than hand-writing them (considered a modification if the subject is learning to write by hand) or having someone else write down answers given verbally
- Presentation accommodations: listening to audiobooks rather than reading printed books (these may be used as substitutes for the text, or as supplements intended to improve the students' reading fluency and phonetic skills), designating a person to read to the student, or providing text to speech software (this is considered a modification if the purpose of the assignment is reading skills acquisition), designating a person to take notes during lectures, or using a talking calculator rather than one with only a visual display
- Setting accommodations: taking a test in a quieter room, moving the class to a room that is physically accessible (e.g., on the first floor of a building or near an elevator), arranging seating assignments to benefit the student (e.g., by sitting at the front of the classroom)
- Scheduling accommodations: rest breaks or extended time on tests (may be considered a modification, if speed is a factor in the test), use a timer to help with time management, students with a disability that can flare up unexpectedly may be allowed to turn in an assignment or take a test shortly after the episode has resolved, (this system, called flexible deadlines, treats an occasional, unexpected episode of illness or incapacity caused by a disability similar to an equivalent episode of an unexpected viral infection, these students or their families should inform the teachers of the problem and turn in the missed work soon after the student is well enough to return to school- typically, one to three days after the return to class).
- Students can be offered a flexible setting in which to take tests. These settings can be a new location to provide for minimal distractions.

All developed countries permit or require some degree of accommodation for students with special needs, and special provisions are usually made in examinations which take place at the end of formal schooling.

=== Modification ===
A modification changes or adapts the material to make it simpler. Modifications may change what is learned, how difficult the material is, what level of mastery the student is expected to achieve, how the student is assessed if at all, or any other aspect of the curriculum. For example, the school may modify a reading assignment for a student with reading difficulties by substituting a shorter, easier book. A student may receive both accommodations and modifications.

Examples of modifications

- Skipping subjects: students may be taught less information than typical students- skipping over material that the school deems inappropriate for the student's abilities or less important than other subjects (for example, students with poor fine motor skills may be taught to print block letters, but not cursive handwriting)
- Simplified assignments: students may read the same literature as their peers but have a simpler version, such as Shakespeare with both the original text and a modern paraphrase available
- Shorter assignments: students may do shorter homework assignments or take shorter tests
- Extra aids: if students have deficiencies in working memory, a list of vocabulary words, called a word bank, can be provided during tests, to reduce lack of recall and increase chances of comprehension, students might use a calculator when other students do not
- Extended time: students with a slower processing speed may benefit from extended time for assignments and tests in order to have more time to comprehend questions, recall information, and synthesize knowledge

=== Non-academic services ===
In addition to how the student is taught the academic curriculum, schools may provide non-academic services to the student. These are intended ultimately to increase the student's personal and academic abilities. Related services include developmental, corrective, and other supportive services as are required to assist a student with learning disabilities. These services include, but are not limited to, speech and language pathology, audiology, psychological services, physical therapy, occupational therapy, counseling services, or music therapy. In some countries, most related services are provided by the schools. In other countries, they are provided by the normal healthcare and social services systems.

As an example, students who have poor impulse control, behavioral challenges, or are autistic may learn self-management techniques, be kept closely on a comfortingly predictable schedule, or be given extra cues to signal activities.

An educational field, termed severe disabilities, is taught throughout the US university sector in schools. Advanced instruction is based upon community-referenced instruction, and alignment with transition to adulthood and progressive community practices.

Rehabilitation counseling personnel are often association with supported employment services, and typically with "transition to adulthood" in which multi-decade recommendations for better coordination between the school and the community service sectors have been made at the federal and university levels.

== Integrating technology in special education classrooms ==
=== Autism ===
Autism, or Autism Spectrum Disorder (ASD), refers to a range of conditions. These conditions involve challenges with social skills, repetitive behaviors, speech and nonverbal communication. They also involve unique strengths and differences.

Autism is a disability that impairs the social interactions and communication skills of a person. People who are autistic tend to think and act differently from others. Many autistic children find themselves comfortable with a device in their hands. For students with autism, there are apps called "visual scene displays" that are most helpful for children who are having difficulty with verbal skills, according to Jules Csillag, a speech–language pathologist who focuses on special ed tech. Apps such as SceneSpeak and Speech with Milo help autistic children develop storytelling skills with text-to-speech voice and interactive storybooks. Using apps like these in a classroom can improve autistic student's verbal skills.

There are several controversies surrounding the diagnoses and causes of autism. It is now believed that there is no single cause of autism. Research seems to suggest that autism is normally the result of both genetic and environmental influences.

=== Down syndrome ===
If a student has Down syndrome, assistive technology can help with their learning experience. Author of Down Syndrome: A Promising Future, Together, Terry Hassold, who got his PhD in human genetics, explains that students with Down syndrome have delays with cognitive ability. Their brains have a late reaction when their neurological system sends a message for any task. Because of this late reaction, they tend to take longer to complete a task than an average student. Assistive technology is crucial in helping students with Down syndrome with their writing ability. Children with Down syndrome tend to have shorter fingers and a lowered thumb making their ability to write more difficult. Also, some of the usual wrist bones are not formed, making it difficult to hold objects. Slanted desks are one type of assisted technology that can aid in the successful ability to write. A three-ring binder can be used to create a slanted desk by turning the binder sideways. Also, students with Down syndrome often try to hold their pencils by anchoring them against the thumb rather than using the tip of their thumb. Shortened pencils or triangular-shaped pencils encourage students to hold them correctly. Using any of these assistive technologies can help students with Down syndrome during their educational process.

== Special education and sports ==
=== Benefits ===
Many people with special needs are denied when they want to participate in a sport. In the U.S., the Office for Civil Rights ensures students with disabilities always have opportunities to participate in extracurricular athletics equal to other students. Special education students can benefit from sports in many ways. For example, studies show it boosts self confidence and improves the participant's skills in relationship building and working as part of a team.

=== Types of sports ===
Almost any sport can be altered for individuals with special needs. Some of the popular sports are swimming, wheelchair soccer, handball, gymnastics, surf therapy, and weightlifting.

=== Organizations and programs ===
Many competitive organizations are available for special needs student-athletes. For example, the Special Olympics is an annual, world-wide competition held for intellectually disabled children that want to participate in sports. Other organizations include the Paralympic Games and Unified Sports, the latter of which pairs participants with and without intellectual disabilities on the same team. Educational institutions can also promote Adapted Physical Education, which tailors sports for students with certain disabilities. Organizations like S.T.R.I.D.E. Adaptive Sports help educational institutions in providing opportunities for special education student athletes. Some of these sports might include wheelchair basketball or sledge hockey.

Some sports even have their own organizations. For example, in baseball, athletes can participate in the Miracle League or Little League Challenger Division. Another organization that athletes can participate in is the US Youth Soccer TOPSoccer or Just for Kicks.

Other sports which can be played or adapted include track and field, quad rugby, tennis, bowling, and skiing.

== Identifying students or learners with special needs ==
Some children are easily identified as candidates for special needs due to their medical history. For example, they may have been diagnosed with a genetic condition that is associated with intellectual disability, may have various forms of brain damage, may have a developmental disorder, may have visual or hearing disabilities, or other disabilities.

On the other hand, for students with less obvious disabilities, such as those who have borderline intellectual disability or specific learning difficulties (dyslexia, dyscalculia, etc.), two primary methods have been used for identifying them: the discrepancy model and the response to intervention model. The discrepancy model depends on the teacher noticing that the students' achievements are noticeably below what is expected, at which point the teacher may make the decision for the student to receive support from a special education specialist. Before doing so, the teacher must show documentation of low academic achievement. The response to intervention model advocates early intervention.

In the discrepancy model, a student receives special education services for a specific learning difficulty (SLD) if the student has at least normal intelligence but the student's academic achievement is below what is expected of a student with his or her IQ. Although the discrepancy model has dominated the school system for many years, there has been substantial criticism of this approach (e.g., Aaron, 1995, Flanagan and Mascolo, 2005) among other researchers. One reason for criticism is that diagnosing SLDs on the basis of the discrepancy between achievement and IQ does not predict the effectiveness of treatment. Low academic achievers who also have low IQ's appear to benefit from treatment just as much as low academic achievers who have normal or high intelligence. This is because, while specific diagnoses may not be discovered, certain discrepancies can be identified early on, thus giving students the opportunity to receive early intervention.

The alternative approach, response to intervention, identifies children who are having difficulties in school in their first or second year after starting school. They then receive additional assistance such as participating in a reading remediation program. The response of the children to this intervention then determines whether they are designated as having a learning disability or otherwise. Those few who still have trouble may then receive designation and further assistance. Sternberg (1999) has argued that early remediation can greatly reduce the number of children meeting diagnostic criteria for learning disabilities. He has also suggested that the focus on learning disabilities and the provision of accommodations in school fails to acknowledge that people have a range of strengths and weaknesses and places undue emphasis on academics by insisting that students should be supported in this area and not in music or sports.

== Criticism ==
=== Access to special education ===
While the number of students with disabilities who are denied education has been decreasing, there is still a relevant number of children who are not getting the education they deserve because of their disabilities. The collection of data on children with disabilities is not straightforward, but data is vital to ensure that policies are in place to address the constraints these children face.

By one estimate, 93 million children under age 14, or 5.1% of the world's children, were living with a 'moderate or severe disability' in 2004. According to the World Health Survey, in 14 of 15 low and middle income countries, disabled people of working age were about one-third less likely to have completed primary school. For example, in Bangladesh, 30% of people with disabilities had completed primary school, compared with 48% of those with no disabilities. The corresponding shares were 43% and 57% in Zambia; 56% and 72% in Paraguay.

It has been shown that children with a higher disability are far more likely to be denied a chance to go to school. In Bangladesh, Bhutan and Iraq, children with mental impairments were most likely to be denied this right. In Iraq, for instance, 10% of 6- to 9-year-olds with no risk of disability had never been to school in 2006, but 19% of those with a hearing impairment and 51% of those with a mental disability had never been to school. In Thailand, almost all 6- to 9-year-olds who had no disability had been to school in 2005–2006, and yet 34% of those with walking or moving impairments had never been to school.

Children with disabilities require access to services that can support them throughout their time in school. According to the United Nations Centre for Human Rights, about 2% of children with disabilities have access to these services. Those without access to these services are excluded from education and unable to attend school. Due to the need of certain services and facilities, the estimated cost of providing education for a disabled child is 2.3 times higher than a child without disabilities. Given the poverty levels in a variety of developing countries, the education of children with disabilities does not become a priority. Children with an intellectual ability are even less likely to attend school than children with physical disabilities. In the Global South, 90% of children with some form of disability do not receive any form of structured education. While current initiatives toward inclusive education internationally have been implemented, such as the Education for All program, some countries in the Global South still challenge the lack of ability to provide children with disabilities access to education due to issues such as lack of resources and schools being overcrowded.

One large issue is limited resources enabling individuals with special needs to receive an education in the developing world. As a consequence, 98 percent of children with special needs in developing countries do not have access to education. Funding cuts can affect special education students who do not have access to proper equipment or education. The National Coalition for Personal Shortages conducted a survey, and nearly 100% of the teachers said that they were not able to give the proper resources to disabled children. There is a financial debate that covers the use and allotment of special education government funding. The three views on this topic are that too much money is already spent, not enough money is being spent, or that the money that is given is not spent properly. The argument for the first is that the amount of money spent on one special needs child is enough to cover a large group of general education students. Sometimes budget cuts even cause several students to lose resources for general programs in order to support one child with special needs. The evidence for special education not having enough money is the lack of teachers, burnt-out teachers and a limited variety of teaching tools for each student. The argument to spend the money differently states that there is a lot of money set aside, but that it is being wasted by spending too much time on paperwork, inefficient IEP meetings or spending money on things that do not actually benefit the child.

=== Eligibility criteria ===
Some parents, advocates, and students have concerns about the eligibility criteria and their application. In some cases, parents and students protest the students' placement into special education programs. For example, a student may be placed into the special education programs due to a mental health condition such as obsessive compulsive disorder, depression, anxiety or panic attacks. However, the student and their parents might believe that the condition is adequately managed through medication and outside therapy. In other cases, students whose parents believe they require the additional support of special education services are denied participation in the program based on the eligibility criteria.

=== Inclusion ===
The practice of inclusion in mainstream classrooms has been criticized by advocates and some parents of children with special needs because some of these students require instructional methods that differ dramatically from typical classroom methods. Critics assert that it is not possible to deliver effectively two or more very different instructional methods in the same classroom. As a result, the educational progress of students who depend on different instructional methods to learn often fall even further behind their peers.

Parents of general education children sometimes fear that the special needs of a single "fully included" student will take critical levels of attention and energy away from the rest of the class and, thereby, impair the academic achievements of all students.

Linked to this, there is debate about the extent to which disabled students, whether in mainstream or special settings, should have a specific pedagogy, based on the scientific study of particular diagnostic categories, or whether general instructional techniques are relevant to all students including those with special needs.

=== Watered-down ===
Some special education classes such as a separate classroom or resource room have been criticized for a watered-down curriculum. This is because students are expected to simply memorize the facts rather than truly understand the information.

=== At-risk students ===
At-risk students with educational needs that are not associated with a disability are often placed in classes with disabled students. Critics assert that placing at-risk students in the same classes as disabled students may impede the educational progress of individuals with disabilities.

=== Seclusion and restraint practices ===
The use of seclusion and restraint practices is a highly controversial practice in the special education system involving the physical restraint of students or involuntarily locking students in seclusion rooms.

== National approaches ==
=== Africa ===
==== Nigeria ====
The Federal Ministry of Education constituted a committee to develop exclusively the first broad-based National Policy on Special Needs Education (SNE) in Nigeria. The constitution of the drafting committee with the mandate to formulate a national policy on special-needs education gave birth to the National Situation Analysis Report. This implies that the status has changed to a national policy on special education in 2015 (an expanded version), thereby widening its scope and activities.

==== South Africa ====
White papers in 1995 and 2001 discuss special education in the country, and local schools are given some independent authority.

Both modifications and accommodations are recommended but not required, depending on the student's individual needs.

=== Asia ===
==== China ====
China holds the largest system of education in the world and features a state run public school system under the order of the Ministry of Education.

==== Iran ====
For special needs children, the education bureau has a special education organization, and Behzisti helps operate some trainable rehabilitation and empowerment schools.

==== Japan ====
Japanese students with special needs are placed in one of four different school arrangements: special schools, special classrooms with another school, resource rooms (which are called tsukyu), or regular classrooms. Some local areas such as Koto Ward in Tokyo are expanding these tsukyu (or, as of 2019, tsubasa classrooms) to cover all junior high schools within the next few years.

Special schools are reserved for students with severe disabilities who cannot be accommodated in their local school. They do not use the same grading or marking systems as mainstream schools, but, instead, they assess students according to their individualized plans.

Special classes are similar, and may vary from the national curriculum as the teachers see fit. Tsukyu are resource rooms that students with milder difficulties use part-time for specialized instruction individually in small groups. These students spend the rest of the day in the mainstream classroom. Some students with special needs are fully included in the mainstream classroom, with accommodations or modifications as needed.

Depending on the local authority, state elementary schools may also hold a naka-yoshi (中よし, 'close friends') class group in addition to the six grades, where students who struggle to adapt to mainstream classrooms are gathered and given life skills as well as completing their studies at a more adaptable pace. This is different from tsukyu in that although all-school activities are regularly held together, the majority of time is spent as a class.

Training of disabled students, particularly at the upper-secondary level, emphasizes vocational education to enable students to be as independent as possible within society after completing their schooling. Vocational training varies considerably depending on the student's disability, options being limited for some. It is clear that the government is aware of the necessity of broadening the range of possibilities for these students. Advancement to higher education is also a goal of the government, and it struggles to have institutions of higher learning accept more disabled students.

==== Pakistan ====
After independence (1947), Pakistan had some serious challenges, due to which no proper emphasis was given to special education and even education. Among other reasons, lack of both financial and physical resources was the major challenge in this context. The need and importance of special education was felt in different educational policies of Pakistan in different times. In its first report, the Commission on National Education (1959) highlighted the importance of special education. After that, the Education Policy (1972) and the National Policy and Implementation Programme (1979) gave some importance to this sector. The same was also reflected in different medium-term (five-year) plans. This was felt more seriously when the Directorate General of Special Education, Islamabad, formulated a draft National Policy for Special Education in 1986 and revised it in 1988 to bring it in-line with the emerging needs of the disabled population. After that, a special education policy was launched in 1999. The Government of Pakistan has launched a new National Policy for Persons with Disabilities in 2002, which is being implemented dynamically.

==== Philippines ====
In the Philippines there is a lack of experts and healthcare professionals such as developmental pediatricians to conduct assessments for learners with disabilities. In 2024 there are only 96 developmental and behavioral pediatrics experts nationwide.

The Department of Education (DepEd) proposed in the budget for 2026 an allocation more than 1 billion pesos for its Special Needs Education program.

Republic Act No. 11650 or the "Instituting a Policy of Inclusion And Services for Learners with Disabilities in Support of Inclusive Education Act" was signed into law on March 11, 2022. The law provides for the initial establishment of an Inclusive Learning Resource Centers (ILRC) in every city and municipality.

In the Province of Isabela, the Municipality of Cabagan constructed an Inclusive Learning Resource Center (ILRC) funded through the FY Seal of Good Local Governance Incentive Fund (SGLGIF) from the Department of Interior and Local Government (DILG).

Initial conversion SPED Centers into prototype Inclusive Learning Resource Centers was mandated by DepEd Order No. 45-2021.

==== Singapore ====
Special education is regulated centrally by the Singapore Ministry of Education. Both special schools and integration into mainstream schools are options for students with special educational needs, but most students with disabilities are placed in special schools.

Students with disabilities who want accommodations on national exams must provide appropriate documentation to prove that they are disabled. Accommodations, but not modifications (e.g., simpler questions) are normally approved if they are similar to the accommodations already being used in everyday schoolwork. The goal of this is to maintain the exam's integrity while not having students unfairly disadvantaged by factors that are unrelated to what is being tested. The accommodations are listed on the Primary School Leaving Exam.

=== Australia ===
Australian Association of Special Education Inc (AASE)'s position is informed by the Disability Standards for Education 2005 which requires that students with disabilities are treated on the same basis as other students in regards to enrollment and participation in education.

With respect to standardized tests, special consideration procedures are in place in all states for students with disabilities. Students must provide documentation. Not all desired forms of accommodations are available. For example, students who cannot read, even if the inability to read is due to a disability, cannot have the exam read to them because the exam results should accurately show that the student is unable to read. Reports on matriculation exams do not mention whether the student received any accommodations in taking the test.

=== Europe ===
Each country in Europe has its own special education support structures. 31 European countries are covered by the European Agency for Special Needs and Inclusive Education.

==== Czech Republic ====
Schools must take students' special education needs into account when assessing their achievements. Students with disabilities are normally included in their neighborhood school, although they may be placed in special schools.

==== Denmark ====
In Denmark, 99% of students with specific learning difficulties such as dyslexia are educated alongside students without any learning challenges.

==== Finland ====
Schools adapt the national guidelines to the needs of individual students. Students with special educational needs are given an individualized plan.

They may be exempted from some parts of school examinations, such as students with hearing impairments not taking listening comprehension tests. If the student receives modifications to the school-leaving exams, this is noted on the certificate of achievement. If they are not following the national core curriculum, then they are tested according to the goals of their individual educational program.

==== France ====
According to the 11 February 2005 Law, all children have the right to be enrolled in their neighborhood school, although children may be placed in medico-social institutions if their personalized plan calls for it. Each student's personalized school plan describes teaching methods, psychological, medical, and paramedical services that the school will provide for the student.

The different paths available for children with disabilities at schools in France are:

- Mainstream school: either with a one-on-one or mutualized aid, or with material or technical support.
- ULIS (unités localisées pour l'inclusion scolaire à l'école): within mainstream schools, students are separated in a special class and given an adapted curriculum according to their specific needs.

Outside of the school system, children may also attend different types of medico-social institutions run by private organizations or charities paid for by the healthcare system. These include:

- IME (instituts médicoéducatifs) for intellectual disabilities or autism
- IEM (instituts d'éducation motrice) for motor disabilities without intellectual disability
- ITEP (instituts thérapeutiques éducatifs et pédagogiques) for disabilities that do not include intellectual disability
- UEMA (Unités d’Enseignement en Maternelle pour enfants Autistes) and UEEA (Unité d’Enseignement en Elémentaire Autisme) which are medico-social classrooms within mainstream schools for children with autism from ages 3–6 and 6–12 respectively.

==== Germany ====
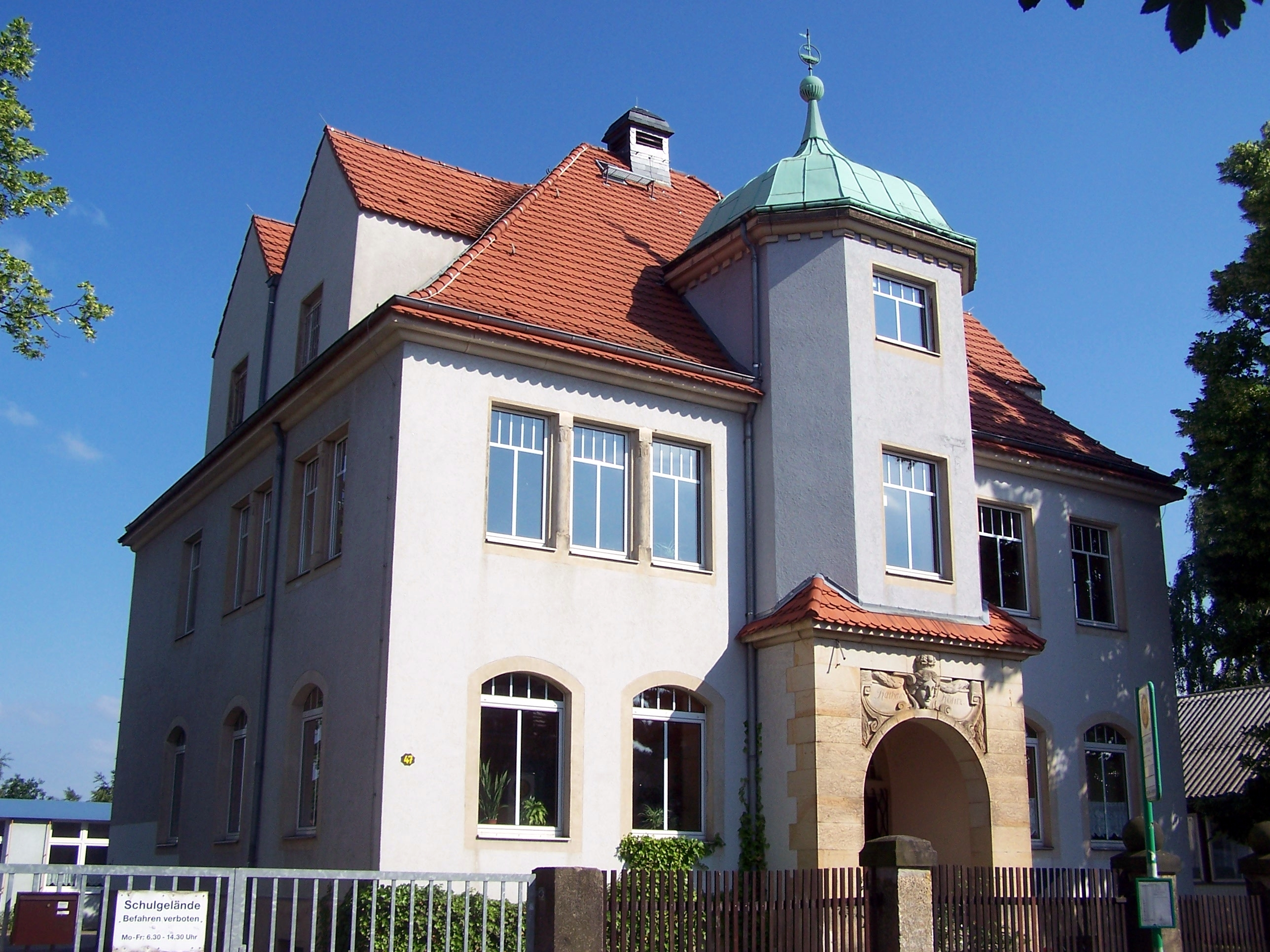
A special school for children with special emotional needs in Kötitz, Germany

Most students with disabilities in Germany attend a special school that serves only children with special needs. These include:

- Förderschule für Lernbehinderte (special school for learning disabilities): for children who have challenges that impair learning
- Förderschule mit dem Förderschwerpunkt Geistige Entwicklung (school for cognitive development): for children with very severe learning challenges
- Förderschule Schwerpunkt emotionale und soziale Entwicklung (school for emotional and social development): for children who have special emotional needs
- Förderschule für Blinde (school for the blind): for blind children
- Förderschule für Sehbehinderte (school for the visually impaired): for children who are visually disabled
- Förderschule für Gehörlose (school for the deaf): for deaf children
- Förderschule für Schwerhörige (school for the hearing impaired): for children who are hearing impaired
- Förderschule für Körperbehinderte (school for children with physical disabilities): for children with physical disabilities
- Förderschule für Sprachbehinderte (school for children with language disorders): for children with language disorders
- Förderschule für Taubblinde (school for the deafblind): for children who are deafblind
- Schule für Kranke (school for ill children): for children who are too ill to attend school or are hospitalized for a longer period of time.
- Förderschule für schwer mehrfach Behinderte (school for children with severe and multiple disabilities): for children with severe and multiple disabilities who need very special care and attention. Sometimes these children are only susceptible for very basic emotional and sensory stimulation. Thus teachers at these school (as well as at schools for the deafblind) are highly specialized professionals.

One in every 21 German students attends a special school. Teachers at these schools are trained professionals who have specialized in special needs education while in university. Special schools often have a very favorable student-teacher ratio and facilities other schools do not have.

Some special needs children in Germany do not attend a special school, but they are educated in a mainstream school such as a Hauptschule or Gesamtschule (comprehensive school).

Students with special educational needs may be exempted from standardized tests or given modified tests.

==== Greece ====
Greek students with special needs may attend either mainstream schools or special schools.

Students whose disabilities have been certified may be exempted from some standardized tests or given alternative tests. Accommodations are responsive to students' needs. For example, students with visual impairments may take oral tests, and students with hearing impairments take written tests. Accommodations and modifications are noted on the certificate of achievement.

==== Hungary ====
Special education is regulated centrally.

According to the 1993 Act on Public Education, students with special educational needs may be exempted from standardized tests or given modified tests. They have a right to extra time, a choice of formats for the tests (e.g., oral rather than written), and any equipment that they normally use during the school day.

As of 2006, disabled students received a significant bonus (eight points) on the university entrance examination, which has been criticized as unfair.

==== Republic of Ireland ====
The National Council for Special Education (NCSE) supports students with physical and intellectual disabilities.

==== Kazakhstan ====
Special and inclusive education in Kazakhstan is regulated by the Law on Education of the Republic of Kazakhstan, which guarantees access to education for children with disabilities and other special educational needs. The law provides several pathways for learners, including special schools, mainstream schools with adapted curricula and support services, and home-based instruction. Since 2023, the Department of Special and Inclusive Education, established within the Ministry of Education of Kazakhstan, coordinates and oversees the implementation of inclusive and special education policies nationwide.

Since amendments in 2011–2012, the national policy framework has formally promoted inclusive education, aiming to integrate children with special needs into general schools. In 2021, a dedicated law on inclusive education strengthened these requirements, obliging educational institutions to ensure accessible environments, provide psychological-pedagogical support, and adapt learning materials and programs.

As of 2024, 86% of Kazakh schools have introduced inclusive conditions, such as resource rooms, support centers, and specialists including special-education teachers, social pedagogues, and psychologists. A nationwide network of special education organizations—such as special kindergartens and schools, rehabilitation centers, autism centers, and psychological-pedagogical support offices—serves more than 200,000 children.

Despite a comprehensive legal framework, implementation of inclusive education in Kazakhstan remains uneven. After ratifying the UN Convention on the Rights of Persons with Disabilities in 2015, the Kazakh government pledged to ensure inclusive conditions in 70% of schools by 2019, but according to Human Rights Watch (HRW), progress has been limited. A 2019 HRW report noted that many children with disabilities still study in segregated institutions or boarding schools, especially in rural regions, while those receiving home-based instruction often get only a few hours of teaching per week, restricting later access to vocational or higher education. Even in cities with established special-education infrastructure, such as Almaty, the proportion of students with disabilities in general schools remains extremely low, with less than 1% of enrolled students identified as having special educational needs.

In 2023, over 162,000 children with special educational needs were enrolled in Kazakhstan, which constitutes 3% of the total child population.

==== The Netherlands ====
As a general rule, students with special educational needs are integrated into their regular, mainstream schools with appropriate support, under the "Going to School Together" policy (Weer Samen Naar School). Four types of disability-specific special schools exist. The national policy is moving towards "suitable education" (passend onderwijs), based on the individual's strengths and weaknesses.

A strong emphasis is placed on the specific needs and positive capabilities of the individual, rather than on limitations. Disabilities are normally documented by experts.

==== Norway ====
The National Support System for Special Needs Education (Statped) is managed by the Norwegian Directorate for Education and Training. The general objective for Statped is to give guidance and support to those in charge of the education in municipalities and county administrations to ensure that children, young people and adults with major and special educational needs are secured and well-advised with educational and developmental provisions. The institutions affiliated with Statped offer a broad spectrum of services. Statped consists of 13 resource centres owned by the state, and four units for special education, where Statped buys services. These centres offer special educational guidance and support for local authorities and county administrations.

==== Portugal ====
Disabled students have a "guaranteed right" to appropriate accommodations on assessments. Schools are generally considered autonomous.

==== Slovenia ====
On national tests, the National Examination Center normally grants most requests for accommodations that are supported by the local school's examination committee. Legislation opposes the use of modifications that would be unfair to non-disabled students.

==== Spain ====
Schools are required to provide services and resources to students with special educational needs so that they make progress and participate in school. If the local school is unable to provide appropriately for an individual student, then the student may be transferred to a special school.

Spanish non-governmental organizations like ONCE have traditionally provided significant services to disabled students.

==== Sweden ====
Local schools have significant autonomy, based on national guidelines. Schools are expected to help students meet the goals that are set for them.

There are special schools (Swedish: särskola) for students with low abilities receive a typical education. In 2012 and 2013, the media criticized how students with disabilities that are considered more mild, such as dyslexia, have been placed in special schools, saying that this may seriously hamper their chances on the labour market.

==== Switzerland ====
Education is controlled by the 26 cantons, so special education programs vary from place to place. However, integration is typical. Students are assessed according to their individual learning goals.

==== Turkey ====
At a young age, students who have special needs in Turkey are provided special education from The Ministry of Education, who are responsible in giving them the education that they need.

In order to get special education, a student is required to have certain documentation:

- Residency certificate
- Written application by the parents to the school administration
- Personal development report of the child (if already registered)
- Child's health report from the hospital.

All special-needs students receive an Individualized Education Program (IEP) that outlines how the school will meet the student's individual needs. The Özel Eğitim Kurumları Yönetmeliği (ÖEKY) requires that students with special needs are provided with a Free Appropriate Public Education in the Least Restrictive Environment that is appropriate to the student's needs. Government-run schools provide special education in varying degrees from the least restrictive settings, such as full inclusion, to the most restrictive settings, such as segregation in a special school.

The education offered by the school must be appropriate to the student's individual needs. Schools are required to maximize the student's potential or to provide the best possible services.

According to the Department of Education, approximately 10 percent of all school-aged children currently receive some type of special education services.

As with most countries in the world, students who are poor, ethnic minorities or do not speak the dominant language fluently are disproportionately identified as needing special education services.

Poor people and refugees are more likely to have limited resources and to employ inexperienced teachers that do not cope well with student behavior problems "thereby increasing the number of students they referred to special education." Teacher efficacy, tolerance, gender, and years of experience and special education referrals.

==== United Kingdom ====
In England and Wales, the acronym SEN (for Special Educational Needs) denotes the condition of having special educational needs, the services which provide the support and the programmes and staff which implement the education. In England, SEN PPS refers to the Special Educational Needs Parent Partnership Service. SENAS is the special educational needs assessment service, which is part of the Local Authority. SENCO refers to a special educational needs coordinator, who usually works with schools and the children within schools who have special educational needs. The Special Educational Needs Parent Partnership Services help parents with the planning and delivery of their child's educational instructions. The Department for Education oversees special education in England.

Most students have an individual educational plan, but students may have a group plan in addition to, or instead of, an individual plan. Group plans are used when a group of students all have similar goals.

In Scotland, the Additional Support Needs Act places an obligation on education authorities to meet the needs of all students in consultation with other agencies and parents. In Scotland, the term Special Educational Needs (SEN) and its variants are not official terminology although the very recent implementation of the Additional Support for Learning Act means that both SEN and ASN (Additional Support Needs) are used interchangeably in current common practice.

=== Latin America ===
Before 1978, little action was taken to educate disabled children in Colombia. Children would be left home without much interaction with the outside world. In 1985, special education was researched across the country and education programs were created. After 1990, disabled people were given access to public school classes. Awareness and recognition of this group's educational rights led to an increase in advocacy for accessibility for disabled children. While there have been improvements, development of special education programs and special education policy is still slow.

==== Colombia ====
Statistics from the National Administrative Department of Statistics (DANE) state that there are 2,624,898 disabled people who reside in Colombia, representing 6.3% of the country's population. According to research in 2010, 90% of disabled students in Colombia did not attend a mainstream school, and only 26% of them are able to attend school at all.

The history of special education in Colombia can be categorized into three time periods: the period of neglect, the period of diagnosis and planning, and the emergence of special education. The period of planning ran from the years 1978 to the year 1990. The Ministry of Colombia in 1995 implemented a national plan for the development of special education called Plan Nacional para el Desarrollo de la Educación Especial. The purpose of the plan were to create a national diagnosis of special education and to initiate programs for individuals with disabilities. In 1994, the Ministry of Education put the first law into action to introduce special classes in public schools that include disabled students, called Law 115. In 2011, Colombia entered into the Convention of Rights of Persons with Disabilities, an agreement among the United Nations Education Scientific and Culture Organization (UNESCO) to protect people living with disabilities.

The most recent development of special education in Colombia was Article 11 of Law 1618, which was passed in 2013. The law states that "the Ministry of Education will define the policy and regulate the scheme of education for persons with special educational needs, promoting educational access and quality under a system based on inclusion in the educational services". The Colombian government has also made financial strides forward in special education, investing over $12.3 million in 2015.

=== North America ===
==== Canada ====
Education in Canada is the responsibility of the individual provinces and territories. As such, rules vary somewhat from place to place. However, inclusion is the dominant model.

For major exams, Canadian schools commonly use accommodations, such as specially printed examinations for visually impaired students, when assessing the achievements of students with special needs. In other instances, disabled students may receive alternative assessments or modifications that simplify tests, or they may be exempted from the tests entirely.

==== United States ====
All special-needs students receive an Individualized Education Program (IEP) that outlines how the school will meet the student's individual needs. The Individuals with Disabilities Education Act (IDEA) requires that students with special needs be provided with a Free Appropriate Public Education in the Least Restrictive Environment that is appropriate to the student's needs. Government-run schools provide special education in varying degrees from the least restrictive settings, such as full inclusion, to the most restrictive settings, such as receiving special education services at home or hospital.

The education offered by the school must be appropriate to the student's individual needs. Educators working in special education must meet specific credentialing requirements, which vary by state. In California, for example, teachers pursue specialized certification pathways to address diverse student needs in inclusive and specialized settings.

According to the Department of Education, approximately 6 million children (roughly 10 percent of all school-aged children) currently receive some type of special education services. As with most countries in the world, students who are poor, ethnic minorities, or do not speak the dominant language fluently are disproportionately identified as needing special education services. Poor, black and Latino urban schools are more likely to have limited resources and to employ inexperienced teachers that do not cope well with student behavior problems "thereby increasing the number of students they referred to special education."

During the 1960s, in some part due to the civil rights movement, some researchers began to study the disparity of education amongst people with disabilities. The landmark Brown v. Board of Education decision, which declared unconstitutional the "separate but equal" arrangements in public schools for students of different races, paved the way for PARC v. Commonwealth of Pennsylvania and Mills vs. Board of Education of District of Columbia, which challenged the segregation of students with special needs. Courts ruled that unnecessary and inappropriate segregation of disabled students was unconstitutional. Congress responded to these court rulings with the federal Education for All Handicapped Children Act in 1975 (since renamed the Individuals with Disabilities Education Act (IDEA)). This law required schools to provide services to students previously denied access to an appropriate education.

In US government-run schools, the dominant model is inclusion. In the United States, three out of five students with academic learning challenges spend the overwhelming majority of their time in the regular classroom.

== See also ==
- Abuse of special education students
- Adapted physical education
- Padded cell
- Disability and poverty
- Disability studies
- Disadvantaged
- Early childhood intervention
- Educational inequality#Special education
- Learning environment
- Learning space
- Mainstreaming in education
- Post Secondary Transition for High School Students with Disabilities
- Reasonable accommodation
- Response to intervention
- Special Assistance Program (Australian education)
- Special needs
- Supported employment services
- Tracking (education)
- Vocational rehabilitation
- Washington County Closed-Circuit Educational Television Project

== Sources ==
This article incorporates text from a free content work. Licensed under CC-BY-SA IGO 3.0 (license statement/permission). Text taken from Rethinking Education: Towards a global common good?, 44, Box 6, UNESCO. UNESCO.
