= Death of Max Benson =

2018 death of autistic boy

On November 30, 2018, 13-year-old Max Benson (October 18, 2005 – November 30, 2018), an autistic boy from Davis, California, died from medical complications caused by being held in an extended prone physical restraint by staff at his now-defunct K-12 non-public school, Guiding Hands School in El Dorado Hills, California, where he was placed a few months prior by Davis Joint Unified School District.

While Benson was initially reported to have been 6 feet (1.8 m) tall and weigh 280 pounds (130 kg), these figures were disputed by the family, who stated that he was "8 inches shorter and 50 pounds lighter" than what the school claimed to the El Dorado County Sheriff's Office. During the extended physical restraint, Benson became unresponsive. According to the investigation conducted by the California Department of Education, which afterward suspended Guiding Hands School's certification, Benson was held in a prone restraint for over 90 minutes, during which he urinated on himself and vomited. Guiding Hands staff failed to call emergency services promptly after Benson became unconscious. Benson was taken to the UC Davis Medical Center, where he died two days later from cardiac complications allegedly caused by the restraint. Three staff from Guiding Hands School faced criminal charges in Benson's death, including felony manslaughter; a civil lawsuit was also filed against Guiding Hands School, several former employees, Davis Joint Unified School District and its employees that placed Max at the school, and other Northern California school districts that contracted with the school. In 2024, California enacted "Max Benson's Law," which prohibits the use of prone restraints on students in all schools in the state.

== Death ==
=== Cause ===
Max Benson
- Born: 18 October 2005; Sacramento, California
- Died: 30 November 2018 (aged 13); UC Davis Medical Center, Sacramento, California
- Cause of death: Suffocation from a physical restraint
- Parent: Stacia Langley

On November 28, 2018, staff at Guiding Hands school held Max Benson in a prone (face-down) physical restraint for more than 90 minutes. While being restrained, Benson vomited and urinated on himself before becoming unconscious. According to a civil lawsuit filed against Guiding Hands School, it took 10 minutes for a school nurse to arrive after staff called for help, and the school failed to call paramedics until nearly a half hour after Benson lost consciousness. Emergency services transported Benson first to Mercy Hospital in Folsom, California, then to UC Davis Medical Center in Sacramento, where Benson was pronounced dead two days after the restraint.

=== Vigils ===
In December 2018, vigils were held for Benson outside of Guiding Hands School and in Davis, California, where Benson had lived with his family. Attendees mourned his death and called for an end to the use of restraints in schools. Many attended because they knew and loved Benson and his family, while others came to call attention to what they described as a "lack of educational resources for students with autism within the school district." Max's family did not attend the vigil, but expressed through a family friend their appreciation to those who did, “and for sharing their fond memories of Max."

Another vigil was held in Placerville, California for Benson nearly a year after his death. Some people wore blue shirts with a photo of Benson and text that read, "What you permit, you promote," referring to the complicity they said schools and teachers engage in by allowing aggressive and prone restraints on students. Vigil organizers said the International Coalition Against Restraint and Seclusion announced worldwide vigils in honor and remembrance of Max. Several people, some of them strangers, sent in letters of support, and lit candles to call for justice and policy changes.

== Investigations and criminal charges ==
=== California Department of Education Investigation ===
Shortly after Benson's death, the California Department of Education (CDE) suspended Guiding Hands School's certification due to the school's failure to notify the CDE in writing of the circumstances surrounding Benson's death, and violation of multiple state rules regarding the use of physical restraints on students. The CDE had also investigated other complaints about the treatment of students at the school.

=== Criminal charges ===
On November 12, 2019, El Dorado County prosecutors filed charges, including felony involuntary manslaughter, against Guiding Hands School site administrator Cindy Keller, school principal Staranne Meyers, and Kimberly Wohlwend, the teacher accused of being among those who restrained Benson. El Dorado County Superior Court Judge Mark Ralphs ordered that the accused not teach school or daycare while the case was pending. If they had been convicted, Keller, Meyers, and Wohlwend could have faced up to four years in state prison. Charges were also filed against the school as an entity. In July 2022, a criminal grand jury in El Dorado County indicted all defendants on charges of involuntary manslaughter. In May 2025, Keller and Meyers entered "no contest" pleas to misdemeanor child abuse, and Wohlwend entered a "guilty" plea to felony involuntary manslaughter. On August 8, 2025, Judge Mark A. Ralphs sentenced Wohlwend to two years' formal probation and sentenced Keller and Meyers to four years' informal probation, ending a criminal case that lasted nearly 7 years.

=== Civil lawsuit ===
A civil suit was filed in November 2019 against Guiding Hands School and several former employees, including Meyers, Keller, and Wohlwend. The suit was filed on behalf of Benson's family and other families of Guiding Hands students and alleges that Wohlwend restrained Benson with the assistance of other school staff members, including Jill Watson, Betty Morgan and Le'Mon Thomas. The suit also names area school districts that contracted with and sent students to Guiding Hands School, along with the California Department of Education and special education administrative bodies in Yolo County and Amador County. Davis Joint Unified School District Special Education Administrators Patrick McGrew, Jennifer Galas and Riley Chessman were also named as defendants. As of September 2025, the case was pending in the U.S. District Court for the Eastern District of California.

=== U.S Department of Education Investigation ===
The U.S. Department of Education's Office for Civil Rights (OCR) announced that the Davis Joint Unified School District in California, which had placed Max at Guiding Hands School, had entered into a settlement after OCR examined whether the district's use of restraint and seclusion in the 2017-2018 and 2018-2019 school years denied its students with disabilities a FAPE in violation of Section 504 of the Rehabilitation Act of 1973 (Section 504), Title II of the Americans with Disabilities Act of 1990 (Title II), and their implementing regulations. OCR determined that the district placed three of its students with disabilities in non-public school settings and violated their rights under Section 504 and Title II because Davis Joint Unified School District:

- Failed to ensure that district staff making placement decisions for these students had access to and carefully considered information obtained about the use of physical restraint and/or seclusion with these students
- Separately failed to ensure that those making decisions regarding behavioral interventions for these students were knowledgeable about each student, the meaning of the evaluation data, and the placement
- Failed to reevaluate these students to determine whether the repeated use of restraint and seclusion for these students denied them a FAPE and if additional aids and services were appropriate to provide a FAPE
- Denied a FAPE to all three students based on the above failures and resulting harms to the students

== Related legislation: Max Benson's Law ==
On September 28, 2024, California Governor Gavin Newsom signed SB 483, also known as "Max Benson's Law," which prohibits the use of prone restraints and prone containment on students in public schools throughout the state. The bill had been introduced by California State Senator Dave Cortese, Senate District 15.

== See also ==
- Disability Day of Mourning
