= Inclusive classroom =

Inclusive classroom is a term used within American pedagogy to describe a classroom in which all students, irrespective of their abilities or skills, are welcomed holistically. It is built on the notion that being in a non-segregated classroom will better prepare special-needs students for later life. In the United States, the Rehabilitation Act of 1973 guaranteed civil rights to disabled people, though inclusion of disabled students progressed slowly until the No Child Left Behind Act of 2001, after which almost half of US students with disabilities were soon in general classrooms.

A lack of resources has placed a considerable burden on teachers and school boards, who are often unprepared and suffer from stress and frustration, affecting the success of programs. An advocated solution is co-teaching, doubling teaching staff to support an inclusive classroom.

== History of inclusion ==
=== Prior to inclusion ===
Prior to the 1970s, most schools in the United States had non-inclusive policies. Students with disabilities were often not permitted to attend public schools as it was believed that they were unable to be educated. Children who were deaf, blind, or had emotional or intellectual disabilities were instead sent to special facilities or institutions. In the late 1960s, almost 200,000 people with significant disabilities lived in state institutions that provided basic needs like food, shelter, and clothing. Those students with mild disabilities were segregated from the rest of the school, where only specially trained teachers could teach them. It was thought that integrating these students into regular classrooms would cause teachers to invest too much time with them due to their unique educational needs, which would then leave other students with little attention. Thus, the presence of students with disabilities was believed to be a burden and a nuisance to the "regular" students.

A few US states began to pass legislation that allowed, but did not require, school districts to begin educating students with certain types of disabilities. However, it was not widespread. In the 1950s, Edward H. Stullken, president and member of the Illinois Council of Exceptional Children, began to question the need to segregate students with disabilities from the public schools. This soon led to the rise of parent activists who challenged the courts. As a result, special education was expanded into public schools. After a successful court case in Pennsylvania, the state law was changed to acknowledge that it had the obligation to provide a free, appropriate education regardless of the disability. This case eventually led the United States to the 1975 creation of the Education for All Handicapped Children Act (EAHCA), which paved the way for all special education programs.

=== Timeline of inclusion ===
Inclusion in the United States began with the Rehabilitation Act of 1973, which guaranteed civil rights to all disabled people and required accommodations for disabled students in schools. The 1975 EAHCA, and its 1986 and 1992 amendments, guaranteed educational rights from any institution receiving funding, and encouraged states to develop programs for individuals with disabilities. In 1997, the EAHCA was revised as the Individuals with Disabilities Education Act (IDEA), and made it mandatory for all schools to develop and provide a free and appropriate public education for all children, in the least-restrictive environment possible. This included the use of Individual Education Plans (IEPs) for all special-education students. These requirements marked the beginning of full inclusion. The 1997 reauthorization of IDEA guaranteed more educational access for students with disabilities.

A 2004 reauthorization of IDEA aligned this act with the 2001 No Child Left Behind Act (NCLB), which supported standards-based education reform. This reauthorization included appropriate technology and more funding specifically for special education. By the early 2000s, almost half of students with disabilities were included in the general classroom. As of 2013, inclusion is still strongly endorsed by the National Association of State Boards of Education (NASBE) and is widely used in most classrooms across the United States. Although there are still controversies and debates on whether inclusion is the best practice for students with disabilities, it has become the norm in most schools in the United States.

== Classification of students ==
Inclusive classrooms have students with disabilities, behavioral issues, social issues, personal issues, intellectual disability, cognitive disabilities, and physical differences. This means every classroom could be considered inclusive. The goal is for the teacher to teach each student with similar effort, so that the nature of disability does not become disruptive to the operation of the class. Therefore, it remains that there is not complete agreement as to whether it is best to include all students with disabilities in the general education classroom or only those who are themselves able to follow a general education curriculum without modification. Where students in a given class are accessing curriculum at different levels of rigor, differentiated instruction is crucial to the successful operation of an inclusive classroom.

=== Disabilities ===
IDEA defines a child with a disability as having intellectual disabilities, hearing loss (including deafness), a speech or language impairment, a visual impairment, a serious emotional disturbance, an orthopedic impairment, autism, traumatic brain injury, another health impairment, a specific learning disability, deaf-blindness, or multiple disabilities. In many cases, students that are covered under IDEA (2004) have IEPs or 504 plans. These students are typically paired with a paraprofessional in the classroom. This person is called also called an aide, paraeducator, or teaching assistant. Research shows that students performed higher when the paraprofessional was trained in inclusive classroom management.

=== Behavioral and social issues ===
Behavioral and social problems range from talking out of turn to acts of violence. Response to intervention (RTI) and school-wide positive behavior interventions and supports (SWPBIS) models are two ways that schools are improving education for students with this type of issue.

Screening tools commonly used include:

- Behavioral Assessment Scale for Children Two (BASC-2): Behavior and Emotional Screening Scale (BESS)
- Brief Academic Competence Evaluation Scales System (BACESS)
- School-wide Information System (SWIS)
- Social Skills Improvement System (SSIS)
- Student Risk Screening Scale (SRSS)
- Student Internalizing Behavior Screening Scale (SIBSS)
- Systematic Screening for Behavior Disorders (SSBD)
- End-of-Year or Grade-to-Grade Transitional Guides

=== Personal issues ===
Students with personal issues include those with different spiritual identities, sexual identities, gender identities, religions, and cultures. Teachers are encouraged to increase representation of these groups in the curriculum through literature and other materials.

=== Cognitive disability ===
There are many types of cognitive impairments that include attention and memory, language, executive function, problem solving and reasoning, and social functioning disabilities. Many of these students will have IEPs. These students may require extra time for homework and tests, alternative testing sites, repeated instructions, and the reduction of multiple-choice answers on exams.

=== Multicultural diversities ===
Physical diversities would entail students of all races, cultures, and ethnicities. As English-language learners work on skills to become fluent in English, they also become an important focus of inclusive classrooms. Diversity should be intertwined into the classroom curriculum to teach all students effectively. Community-referenced instruction, a curriculum approach that allows educators to design lessons with multiple roles, challenges, and opportunities for learning, is a tool used to benefit all students in inclusive classrooms. Work experiences, research terms, and service learning are some examples of instruction within these inclusive classrooms.

=== Intellectual giftedness ===
According to 20 USC § 7801(27), "gifted and talented" students are those who give evidence of high achievement capability – in areas such as intellectual, creative, artistic, or leadership capacity, or in specific academic fields – and who need services or activities not ordinarily provided by the school in order to fully develop those capabilities.

A study found gifted students in suburban schools outperformed gifted students in urban schools. Institutional shortcomings, such as poor curriculums, unrelatable teachers, and general opportunity gaps, are believed to be the reasoning behind urban school students' underperformance.

== Theories and approaches ==
There are various lesson plans, layouts, and approaches to inclusive teaching that can be applied to the various scenarios and backgrounds of students.

The first step requires that teachers make an effort to understand the students who require inclusive education. As stated by Cathy LeDoux, "The consensus among the literature has been that general education teachers are inadequately prepared to work with special needs students and, therefore, not prepared for inclusion." Therefore, misunderstanding, prejudice, and isolation can result. Teachers should attempt to understand students with special needs by asking a series of questions:

- What challenges do special education students present for general education teachers in inclusive classrooms?
- What are the perceived needs of general education teachers in relation to accommodating special education students in their classrooms?
- In what ways can administration support general education teachers in accommodating special education students?

=== Co-teaching ===
One approach is to implement co-teaching, the process where two teachers work together in order to teach students within the same classroom. In the case of inclusive teaching, a general teacher usually does not have the skill nor the understanding that is needed to relate to students with disabilities. Thus, a special education teacher is used to understand the problems faced by students with special needs. In this approach, general education teachers and special education teachers need to be effective communicators to create lesson plans, homework exercises, and communication methods that revolve around the inclusion of students with special needs.

When a sound co-teaching system is in effect, there are several instructional models that can be used. One model is referred to as "selecting manageable texts" whereby teachers match students to reading materials based upon whether the student needs special assistance due to special needs. Readability, vocabulary complexity, interest level, presence of prior knowledge, and the use of text enhancement are factors that are considered when matching students with texts. Specifically, book length, chapter length, and whether or not the book will maintain a student's attention are considered. Co-teaching can also help match a student's skills and abilities related to inclusive teaching to an IEP, a program developed for every student with special needs.

=== Individualized education plans ===
An individualized education program (IEP) is a document that outlines the educational needs and goals of a student with a disability, and describes the programs and services that a school district will provide to help the student make educational progress. It defines based upon research on education and assessment of student, an approach to teaching a student with special needs and may help integrate that student into a general classroom, in advancement of a student's educational progress. An IEP may determine the proper placement of a student in inclusive education through tests, studies, and interviews with counselors and family members. Based upon the arrangement of homework assignments, team projects, and basic communication with other students and teachers, students can then learn what works best for them. Despite a student's physical, emotional, or psychological condition, a teacher must commit to understand a student's well-being in order to provide necessary and contextually appropriate support. In 2018–19, the number of students ages 3–21 who received special education services under the Individuals with Disabilities Education Act (IDEA) was 7.1 million, or 14 percent of all public school students. Among all students ages 6–21 served under IDEA, the percentage who spent most of the school day (i.e., 80 percent or more of their time) inside general classes in regular schools increased from 47 percent in fall 2000 to 64 percent in fall 2018. In contrast, during the same period, the percentage of students who spent 40 to 79 percent of the school day inside general classes decreased from 30 to 18 percent, and the percentage of students who spent less than 40 percent of their time inside general classes decreased from 20 to 13 percent. Inclusive teaching can be made easier for teachers when systems are put into place that lay the groundwork.

=== Support services ===
It can be difficult to determine the role of school officials, educators, and counselors when practicing inclusive education, especially when students with special needs are a rarity in school environments. Uncertainty can be detrimental in determining how to begin any aspect of inclusive education, whether that be ideas, lesson plans, or educational and psychological inquiries. One way to overcome this is by coordinating all of these stages into a progressive smooth-running unit. Questions arise as to who students should visit first, what questions should be posed to students and their parents, what subjects should be presented to students in order to determine which they will perform well in. It is not proper to function without preparation when it comes to inclusive education. Therefore, it is best to create "a set of principles to guide support services", even if they are imperfect. These principles should be based on the social, educational, and psychological functions of disabled students in order to best serve their educational and personal goals. Principles will consolidate processes and remove confusion related to school systems. They can also clarify the roles of educators, counselors, and administrators in terms of what each can specifically do for students with special needs.

== Critiques and attitudes ==
=== Overview ===
There are conflicting attitudes regarding inclusive classrooms and teaching special needs students within mainstream classrooms as some people may believe that inclusivity within a classroom environment will damage the education of children without disabilities. However, one study argued, "Inclusive practices allow students to become full members of a classroom community, thus allowing them to develop both academically and socially". Critiques of universal inclusion argue the practice ignores the needs of the student, and many students' needs cannot reasonably be met within general education settings. It is further argued that the movement for fully inclusive classrooms prioritizes group values and ideologies over evidence.

Positive and negative attitudes amongst teachers can affect the success of inclusive classrooms. Factors that influence teacher attitudes include: teacher differences, classroom learning environments, adequacy of support, stress, and willingness to include. Findings of a paper published in Learning Environments Research suggest that educators who were receptive and assumed direct authority had a better chance of achieving success. However, teacher attitudes alone do not determine the appropriateness of an education placement for meeting educational needs. Students with severe, sensory, or multiple impairments may be less likely to receive appropriate educational services in an inclusive classroom, regardless of teacher attitude. These students require intensive, effective, evidence-based interventions targeted at their unique needs.

=== Negative teacher attitudes ===
Negative attitudes towards inclusion are linked to teachers' frustrations towards their own abilities to teach in an inclusive classroom. While professional development workshops are found to positively impact teachers' abilities to teach student with specific learning difficulties, they are not always offered.

In addition to frustration, teachers' feelings of fear are linked to not knowing "how best to incorporate students with disabilities into the regular education environment", which serves as a barrier in preventing "full inclusion".

It was found teachers who were less inclined to include special needs students in their classrooms also expressed greater concern for students' educational success. This paradox leads teachers "to be less proactive in effectively supporting them".

=== Positive teacher attitudes ===
It has also been suggested that positive teacher attitudes are dependent upon the classroom teachers' beliefs about implementing inclusive educational policy and practice into the classroom. Since the mere acceptance of inclusion is likely to affect the teachers' commitment to its implementation, teachers' beliefs and attitudes are critical to ensure success.

Other factors that influence positive teacher attitudes toward inclusion are pre-service training (i.e., educational or general education courses). It has been suggested that "pre-service training may be the optimum time to address educators' concerns and change any negative attitudes about inclusive education". When teachers expand their knowledge on special education and the needs of students with special disabilities, they shape their perspectives and confidence in teaching an inclusive classroom.

Negative attitudes towards inclusive practices are "attributed to a lack of understanding and a fear of what is unknown".
