= Minimally invasive education =

Self-directed learning methodology using unsupervised computer access

Minimally invasive education (MIE) is a form of learning in which children operate in unsupervised environments. The methodology arose from an experiment done by Sugata Mitra while at NIIT in 1999, often called The Hole in the Wall, which has since gone on to become a significant project with the formation of Hole in the Wall Education Limited (HiWEL), a cooperative effort between NIIT and the International Finance Corporation, employed in some 300 'learning stations', covering some 300,000 children in India and several African countries.

The programme has been feted with the digital opportunity award by WITSA, and been extensively covered in the media.

== History ==
=== Background ===
Professor Mitra, Chief Scientist at NIIT, is credited with proposing and initiating the Hole-in-the-Wall programme. As early as 1982, he had been toying with the idea of unsupervised learning and computers. Finally, in 1999, he decided to test his ideas in the field.

=== The experiment ===
On 26 January 1999, Mitra's team carved a "hole in the wall" that separated the NIIT premises from the adjoining slum in Kalkaji, New Delhi. Through this hole, a freely accessible computer was put up for use. This computer proved to be popular among the slum children. With no prior experience, the children learned to use the computer on their own. This prompted Mitra to propose the following hypothesis: The acquisition of basic computing skills by any set of children can be achieved through incidental learning provided the learners are given access to a suitable computing facility, with entertaining and motivating content and some minimal (human) guidance.

In the following comment on the TED website Mitra explains how they saw to it that the computer in this experiment was accessible to children only:

"... We placed the computers 3 feet off the ground and put a shade on top, so if you are tall, you hit your head on it. Then we put a protective plastic cowl over the keyboard which had an opening such that small hands would go in. Then we put a seating rod in front that was close to the wall so that, if you are of adult height, your legs would splay when you sit. Then we painted the whole thing in bright colours and put a sign saying 'for children under 15'. Those design factors prevented adult access to a very large extent."

=== Results ===
Mitra has summarised the results of his experiment as follows. Given free and public access to computers and the Internet, a group of children can

- Become computer literate on their own, that is, they can learn to use computers and the Internet for most of the tasks done by lay users.
- Teach themselves enough English to use email, chat and search engines.
- Learn to search the Internet for answers to questions in a few months time.
- Improve their English pronunciation on their own.
- Improve their mathematics and science scores in school.
- Answer examination questions several years ahead of time.
- Change their social interaction skills and value systems.
- Form independent opinions and detect indoctrination.

== Current status and expansion outside India ==
The first adopter of the idea was the Government of the National Capital Territory of Delhi. In 2000, the Government of Delhi set up 30 Learning Stations in a resettlement colony. This project is ongoing and is said to be achieving significant results.

Encouraged by the initial success of the Kalkaji experiment, freely accessible computers were set up in Shivpuri (a town in Madhya Pradesh) and in Madantusi (a village in Uttar Pradesh). These experiments came to be known as Hole-in-the-Wall experiments. The findings from Shivpuri and Madantusi confirmed the results of Kalkaji experiments. It appeared that the children in these two places picked up computer skills on their own. Dr. Mitra defined this as a new way of learning "Minimally Invasive Education".

At this point in time, the International Finance Corporation joined hands with NIIT to set up Hole-in-the-Wall Education Ltd (HiWEL). The idea was to broaden the scope of the experiments and conduct research to prove and streamline Hole-in-the-Wall. The results, show that children learn to operate as well as play with the computer with minimum intervention. They picked up skills and tasks by constructing their own learning environment.

Today, more than 300,000 children have benefited from 300 Hole-in-the-Wall stations over the last 8 years. In India, Suhotra Banerjee (Head-Government Relations) has increased the reach of HiWEL learning stations in Nagaland, Jharkhand, and Andhra Pradesh, and is slowly expanding their numbers.

Besides India, HiWEL also has projects abroad. The first such project was established in Cambodia in 2004. The project currently operates in Botswana, Mozambique, Nigeria, Rwanda, Swaziland, Uganda, and Zambia, besides Cambodia. The idea, also called Open learning, is even being applied in Britain, albeit inside the classroom.

== HiWEL ==
Hole-in-the-Wall Education Ltd. (HiWEL) is a joint venture between NIIT and the International Finance Corporation. Established in 2001, HiWEL was set up to research and propagate the idea of Hole-in-the-Wall, a path-breaking learning methodology created by Mitra, Chief Scientist of NIIT.

== Awards and recognition ==
- Digital Opportunity Award by the World Information Technology and Services Alliance (WITSA) in 2008. Reason: "groundbreaking work in developing computer literacy and improving the quality of education at a grass root level."

== Coverage in the media ==
The project has received extensive coverage from sources as diverse as UNESCO, Business Week, CNN, Reuters, and The Christian Science Monitor, besides being featured at the annual TED conference in 2007.

The project received international publicity, when it was found that it was the inspiration behind the book Q & A, itself the inspiration for the Academy Award winning film Slumdog Millionaire.

HiWEL has been covered by the Indian Reader's Digest.

== In school ==
Minimally Invasive Education in school adduces that there are many reasons why children may have difficulty learning, especially when the learning is imposed and the subject is something the student is not interested in, a frequent occurrence in modern schools. Schools also label children as "learning disabled" and place them in special education even if the child does not have a learning disability, because the schools have failed to teach the children basic skills.

Minimally Invasive Education in school asserts that there are many ways to study and learn. It argues that learning is a process you do, not a process that is done to you. The experience of schools holding this approach shows that there are many ways to learn without the intervention of teaching, to say, without the intervention of a teacher being imperative. In the case of reading for instance in these schools some children learn from being read to, memorizing the stories and then ultimately reading them. Others learn from cereal boxes, others from game instructions, others from street signs. Some teach themselves letter sounds, others syllables, others whole words. They adduce that in their schools, no child has ever been forced, pushed, urged, cajoled, or bribed into learning how to read or write, and they have had no dyslexia. None of their graduates are real or functional illiterates, and no one who meets their older students could ever guess the age at which they first learned to read or write.

In a similar form students learn all the subjects, techniques and skills in these schools. Every person, children and youth included, has a different learning style and pace and each person, is unique, not only capable of learning but also capable of succeeding. These schools assert that applying the medical model of problem-solving to individual children who are pupils in the school system, and labeling these children as disabled—referring to a whole generation of non-standard children that have been labeled as dysfunctional, even though they suffer from nothing more than the disease of responding differently in the classroom than the average manageable student—systematically prevents the students' success and the improvement of the current educational system, thus requiring the prevention of academic failure through intervention. This, they clarify, does not refer to people who have a specific disability that affects their drives; nor is anything they say and write about education meant to apply to people who have specific mental impairments, which may need to be dealt with in special, clinical ways.

Describing current instructional methods as homogenization and lockstep standardization, alternative approaches are proposed, such as the Sudbury model schools, an alternative approach in which children, by enjoying personal freedom thus encouraged to exercise personal responsibility for their actions, learn at their own pace rather than following a chronologically-based curriculum. These schools are organized to allow freedom from adult interference in the daily lives of students. As long as children do not harm others, they can do whatever they want with their time in school. The adults in other schools plan a curriculum of study, teach the students the material and then test and grade their learning. The adults at Sudbury schools are "the guardians of the children's freedom to pursue their own interests and to learn what they wish," creating and maintaining a nurturing environment, in which children feel that they are cared for, and that does not rob children of their time to explore and discover their inner selves. They are also there to answer questions and to impart specific skills or knowledge when asked to by students. As Sudbury schools, proponents of unschooling have also claimed that children raised in this method do not suffer from learning disabilities, thus not requiring the prevention of academic failure through intervention.

"If learning is an emergent phenomenon, then the teacher needs to provide stimulus — lots of it – in the form of “big” questions. These must include questions to which the teacher, or perhaps anyone, does not have the answer. These should be the sorts of questions that will occupy children’s minds perpetually. The teacher needs to help each child cultivate a vision of the future. Thus, a new primary curriculum needs to teach only three skills: 1. Reading comprehension: This is perhaps the most crucial skill a child needs to acquire while growing up. 2. Information search and analysis: First articulated at the National Institute of Technology in India by professor J.R. Isaac in the early 1990s — decades ahead of its time — this skill set is vital for children searching for answers in an infinite cyberspace. 3. A rational system of belief: If children know how to search, and if they know how to read, then they must learn how to believe. Each one of us has a belief system. How soon can a child acquire one? A rational belief system will be our children’s protection against doctrine. Children who have these skills scarcely need schools as we define them today. They need a learning environment and a source of rich, big questions. Computers can give out answers, but they cannot, as of yet, make questions. Hence, the teacher’s role becomes bigger and stranger than ever before: She must ask her “learners” about things she does not know herself. Then she can stand back and watch as learning emerges."

== See also ==
- Open learning
- Didactic method
- Response to intervention
- Positive Behavior Interventions and Supports
- Sudbury school
- Problem-based learning
