= Daniel Messinger =

American psychologist

- Occupations: Developmental psychologist, and academic

Academic background
- Education: B.A. in Psychology, M.A. in Human development, and Ph.D. in Developmental psychology
- Alma mater: Haverford College; University of Chicago; University of Utah

Daniel S. Messinger is an American interdisciplinary developmental psychologist, and academic. His research works span the field of developmental psychology with a focus on emotional and social development of children and infants, and the interactive behavior of children in preschool inclusive classroom.

Messinger is a professor of Psychology, Pediatrics, Music Engineering, and Electrical and Computer Engineering at the University of Miami. He is also a Research Director of the Linda Ray Intervention Center, and Director of Child Division in the Department of Psychology, the Early Play and Development Lab, and the Social and Behavioral Data Science group at the Institute for Data Science and Computing at the University of Miami.

== Education ==
Messinger graduated from Haverford College in Haverford, Pennsylvania in 1985 with an independent major in psychology, and a minor in Sociology. He received his M.A. degree in Human Development from the University of Chicago in 1988 and enrolled at the University of Utah for a Ph.D. in Developmental Psychology, which he completed in 1994.

== Career ==
Messinger started his academic career as a Senior Research Associate in the Department of Pediatrics at the University of Miami Medical School in 1993, and held a brief appointment as the Adjunct Assistant Professor of Pediatrics in 1994. He was appointed to assistant professor of Psychology and Pediatrics in 1998, and then to associate professor of Psychology and Pediatrics in 2003. Having served at the position till 2009, he held a brief appointment as an associate professor of psychology, Pediatrics, and Electrical & Computer Engineering at University of Miami. As of 2014, he has been serving as the Professor of Psychology, Pediatrics, Music Engineering, and Electrical & Computer Engineering at University of Miami.

Messigner has served as the Coordinator of Developmental Area in Child Division of Department of Psychology at the University of Miami since 2014 through 2022. He served as the Program Director of Social Systems Informatics in Center for Computational Science from 2015 till 2021 and continued from that point as the Program Director of Social and Behavioral Data Science at the Frost Institute for Data Science and Computing. He holds the appointment as Research Director of Linda Ray Intervention Center as of 2021, and Director of Child Division in Department of Psychology at University of Miami since 2022.

== Research ==
Messinger has authored numerous publications. His research in developmental psychology focuses on modelling big behavioral data often measured automatically from video, audio, and location tracking to examine social, language, and emotional development, attachment assessment, and interactive behavior of children in preschool classes. He has led numerous longitudinal research initiatives e.g., conducting research on the early communication and development of infants at risk of ASD and has been awarded funding grants from National Institutes of Health, the National Science Foundation, and the Institute of Education Sciences.

=== Social development of infants and children ===
Messinger's research on early social development, has focused on emotion and interaction using automated measurement of facial expressions of children. In one of his research studies, maternal depression was associated with attachment insecurity, and had significant impact on maternal depression among infants and pre-schoolers.

Messinger's research also considered the dynamic system approach, analyzed the relationship between emotional actions and the development of smiling, and presented a model that suggested how emotional processes in early infancy emerge in a social context. While focusing on the interactive development of social smiling, his research conducted with Alan Fogel reported on the early emergence of smiling, explored the perception and production of infant smiles, as touched on the heritability of smiling. Furthermore, he found that infants seem to have an interactive strategy to increase time when their mothers are smiling as early as 4 months of age, and used that strategy to program a child-like robot face to elicit smiles from adults.

=== Infants and children at risk of autism ===
Messinger has focused his research studies on infants with typical development, infants with autistic siblings (i.e., baby siblings), and children with autism spectrum disorder. One of his highly cited research papers entitled "Recurrence risk for autism spectrum disorders: a Baby Siblings Research Consortium study" revealed that sibling recurrence rate of ASD tends to be higher than previously estimated. His research reported the recurrence rate to be 18.7%, and indicated that male gender increased the likelihood of developing ASD as did having more than one sibling with ASD. The diagnostic stability in young children at risk for developing ASD was explored, and it was shown that among infants at high familial likelihood of ASD, a diagnosis of ASD at 18 or 24 months of age was likely to be stable through 36 months. He reviewed, and researched the methodological and translational challenges linked with the high-risk infant sibling research.

Messinger also characterized the emotional communication in typically developed children, and children with ASD. He found that infants at high-likelihood or risk for autism spectrum disorder (ASD) who exhibited insecure-resistant attachments were more likely to receive the ASD diagnosis as compared to the infants with secure attachments. This, consequently, indicated that the attachment security posits key information regarding the diagnosis in high-risk siblings. Focusing on the clinical assessment and management of ASD, together with a group of academics, he has discussed the challenges associated with the early detection, diagnosis, and treatment of children with ASD, as well as children under 2 who show signs of ASD. While studying the impact of "Hanen's 'More Than Words" (HMTW) intervention in early ASD symptoms in toddlers, he noted differential effects on child communication and assessed how the parents of children with higher levels of object interest may need greater support for the implementation of HMTW.

=== Interactive behavior in schools (IBIS) ===
Messinger conducted extensive research focused on the interactive behavior of children with ASD, children with hearing impairments, and children with typical development in inclusive preschool classroom. His research investigated children's interactions with peers and teachers by pairing spatial tracking using Ubisense (a radio frequency identification system) and speech recognition via LENA. To examine dynamic classroom social interactions, he used spatial tracking to analyze the continuous movement and location of children in a preschool classroom setting. This revealed that children tend to be in social contact ten to hundreds of times more with the most contacted than the least contacted peers. He and his colleagues also used transitivity as a lens to assess gender-based cliques, which suggested the validity of their approach. Additional research aiming to validate their procedures for measuring proximity and child vocalizations showed associations with peer nomination and teacher's ratings of sociability. Addressing the significance of computational approaches to understand child behavior, interaction, and development, his research determined that velocity of movement, and social contact of children with others illustrate homophily even in the inclusive classroom setting i.e., children with ASD were likely to interact with other children in the same group. Another important finding from his research work on automated measurement of vocalizations suggested that the phonemic complexity of children's speech is influenced by the phonemic complexity of teacher speech in the preschool classroom.

With the use of objectively measured behavioral data, Messinger also explored the associations of vocal interactions, and language development between children with and without autism in inclusive classroom setting of preschools. The research findings revealed the significance of peers, and social networks regarding the development of language abilities of children with or without ASD. His research also evaluated the importance of dyadic peer interactions and support for the language use, and abilities for children with hearing loss as well. Together with a group of researchers, the findings from his research study looking into the language experiences of children from low socioeconomic status (SES) highlighted an increase in language development of children because of the language input from peers. In this study, there was an apparent impact on children's language use from conversational turns with teachers as seen in data collected from LENA technology.

== Awards and honors ==
- 1999 – Directorate Dissertation Research Award, American Psychological Association Science
- 2000 – James W. McLamore Summer Award in Business and the Social Sciences for Positive and negative facial expressions in infancy, University of Miami
- 2002 – James W. McLamore Summer Award in Business and the Social Sciences for The intensification of positive and negative facial expressions in infancy, University of Miami
- 2004 – MUSE Award, Contributions to the Undergraduate Program, Psychology Department, University of Miami
- 2004 – James W. McLamore Summer Award in Business and the Social Sciences for "Predicting Referential Communication among Typically Developing and At-Risk Infants", University of Miami.
- 2014-2020 – Cooper Fellow, University of Miami
- 2017-2018 – ULink Fellow, University of Miami

=== Selected articles ===
- Messinger DS (February 2002). "Positive and negative: Infant facial expressions and emotions". Current Directions in Psychological Science. 11 (1): 1–6. doi:10.1111/1467-8721.00156. S2CID 18394755.
- Yale ME, Messinger DS, Cobo-Lewis AB, Delgado CF (September 2003). "The temporal coordination of early infant communication". Developmental Psychology. 39 (5): 815–24. doi:10.1037/0012-1649.39.5.815. PMID 12952396.
- Messinger DS, Bauer CR, Das A, Seifer R, Lester BM, Lagasse LL, Wright LL, Shankaran S, Bada HS, Smeriglio VL, Langer JC, Beeghly M, Poole WK (June 2004). "The maternal lifestyle study: cognitive, motor, and behavioral outcomes of cocaine-exposed and opiate-exposed infants through three years of age". Pediatrics. 113 (6): 1677–85. doi:10.1542/peds.113.6.1677. PMID 15173491.
- Messinger DS, Mahoor MH, Chow SM, Cohn JF (May 2009). "Automated Measurement of Facial Expression in Infant-Mother Interaction: A Pilot Study". Infancy. 14 (3): 285–305. doi:10.1080/15250000902839963. PMC 2746084. PMID 19885384.
- Messinger DS, Mattson WI, Mahoor MH, Cohn JF (June 2012). "The eyes have it: making positive expressions more positive and negative expressions more negative". Emotion. 12 (3): 430–6. doi:10.1037/a0026498. PMC 4492304. PMID 22148997.
- Messinger DS, Young GS, Webb SJ, Ozonoff S, Bryson SE, Carter A, Carver L, Charman T, Chawarska K, Curtin S, Dobkins K, Hertz-Picciotto I, Hutman T, Iverson JM, Landa R, Nelson CA, Stone WL, Tager-Flusberg H, Zwaigenbaum L (2015). "Early sex differences are not autism-specific: A Baby Siblings Research Consortium (BSRC) study". Molecular Autism. 6: 32. doi:10.1186/s13229-015-0027-y. PMC 4455973. PMID 26045943.
- Martin KB, Haltigan JD, Ekas N, Prince EB, Messinger DS (September 2020). "Attachment security differs by later autism spectrum disorder: A prospective study". Developmental Science. 23 (5) e12953. doi:10.1111/desc.12953. PMID 32078210. S2CID 211214535.
- Prince EB, Ciptadi A, Tao Y, Rozga A, Martin KB, Rehg J, Messinger DS (May 2021). "Continuous measurement of attachment behavior: A multimodal view of the strange situation procedure". Infant Behavior & Development. 63 101565. doi:10.1016/j.infbeh.2021.101565. PMID 33887566. S2CID 233372571.
- Messinger DS, Perry LK, Mitsven SG, Tao Y, Moffitt J, Fasano RM, Custode SA, Jerry CM (2022). "Computational approaches to understanding interaction and development". Advances in Child Development and Behavior. 62: 191–230. doi:10.1016/bs.acdb.2021.12.002. ISBN 978-0-323-91587-8. PMC 9840818. PMID 35249682. S2CID 246805335.
