= Co-enrollment =

Co-enrollment is an instructional approach that brings deaf or hard of hearing (DHH) students and hearing students together in a classroom. It is distinguished from mainstreaming approaches in several ways and more closely follows bilingual and dual language education practice and goals. In the 1960s and 1970s, many schools for the deaf in Scandinavia moved from an oral approach to a bilingual model. During the 1980s, many schools for the deaf in the United States began implementing bilingual curriculum under a bilingual-bicultural education model. During the 1980s and 1990s, this model was widely adopted around the globe. Co-enrollment extends the bilingual educational approach to include hearing students as well, with varying emphasis on Deaf culture. Programs following this model provide all students with access to signed, spoken and written language.

== Criteria ==
Although all co-enrollment programs share a general philosophy, the specific approaches can vary. All problems definitionally include a "visible and substantial group" of deaf and hard of hearing students alongside hearing students. They are also usually, but not always, co-taught by a classroom teacher and a teacher of the deaf or special education teacher.

Other common factors include the use of sign language among all students, priority for enrollment of siblings of deaf children and children of deaf adults, and infrequent use of classroom interpreters.

Many co-enrollment programs are also bilingual, and promote the use of sign for all students.

== History ==
The first educational programs for deaf and hard of hearing (DHH) children were segregated residential schools. These programs helped students to connect with Deaf culture, but separated them from their families. Legislation in the latter half of the twentieth century, such as the U.S. Education for All Handicapped Children Act, changed this, and DHH students began to be mainstreamed into classrooms side by side with hearing students. Mainstreaming can improve academic achievement for some DHH students, while others can lag behind due to unmet communication needs. Additionally, mainstreamed students often lack access to same-age DHH peers while simultaneously struggling to develop friendships with hearing peers.

The co-enrollment model was independently developed by practitioners in several different countries by 2015.

TRIPOD (Toward Rehabilitation Involvement by Parents of the Deaf), founded in 1982 and opening in 1984, was one of the first co-enrollment programs in the United States. It began as a preschool program, establishing co-enrollment classes with a mix of hearing and deaf students, co-taught by a regular teacher and teacher of the deaf, using sign and Total Communication.

The first co-enrollment program in Australia was founded at Toowong State School in Brisbane, Queensland, Australia in 2001. It started with a class of 24 children, five of them profoundly deaf, a classroom teacher, a deaf teacher of the deaf, and a teacher aide who was also a CODA.

== Benefits and drawbacks ==
Co-enrollment programs seek to fill gaps in special schools and mainstream programs. Like in special schools, Deaf role models and sign language are given a key role in the educational day. They also wish to take advantage of the academic standards found in mainstream settings. Families are encouraged to learn sign together and deaf and hearing students learn how to advocate for each other and think about inclusion in both academic and social contexts.

In theory, co-enrollment means that deaf and hard of hearing (DHH) students are socially integrated with each other and with hearing peers. This compares favorably to self-contained programs that separate them from peers and to integrated programs where a student may be the only deaf or hard of hearing student in the classroom. DHH students are full members of the classroom community rather than "present provisionally or on sufferance."

However, research on social integration in co-enrollment programs has produced mixed results, with some possibility that even in co-enrollment programs, students tend to segregate by hearing status.

There are few studies that have been conducted on co-enrollment schools, though early works indicate that deaf students establish a greater sense of self than in mainstream settings, and that hearing students are more likely to include the deaf students in social aspects of the school day.

The effects of co-enrollment programs on academic integration and performance are difficult to determine, because students in a co-enrollment program may not be a representative sample of all DHH students.

It can be difficult to establish co-enrollment classrooms for several reasons, some logistical and some attitudinal. Particularly in rural areas, it can be difficult and expensive to collocate enough DHH students to make the program work. Additionally, co-enrollment programs can face resistance from administrators, teachers and parents who are concerned about negative impacts on the school's curriculum or on co-enrolled hearing students.

Co-teaching can also be difficult, as reported by some teachers in the TRIPOD program. Teachers who are new to working with DHH students may bring negative assumptions about how capable DHH students are, and it can also be tempting for the general education teacher to work mostly with hearing students and the special education teacher to work mostly with DHH students.

There are also inherent communication challenges in co-education. Not everyone will be able to learn both spoken language and sign language, for a variety of reasons. Some TRIPOD teachers noted that these difficulties can lead to a slower pace of instruction.

Co-enrollment classes are also not the best fit for all students. Some autistic hearing children find the visual stimulation of a co-enrollment classroom overwhelming. DHH students with other disabilities cannot always have their needs met entirely in the mainstream classroom, and leaving the classroom frequently can interfere with the co-enrollment environment.
