= Toowong State School =

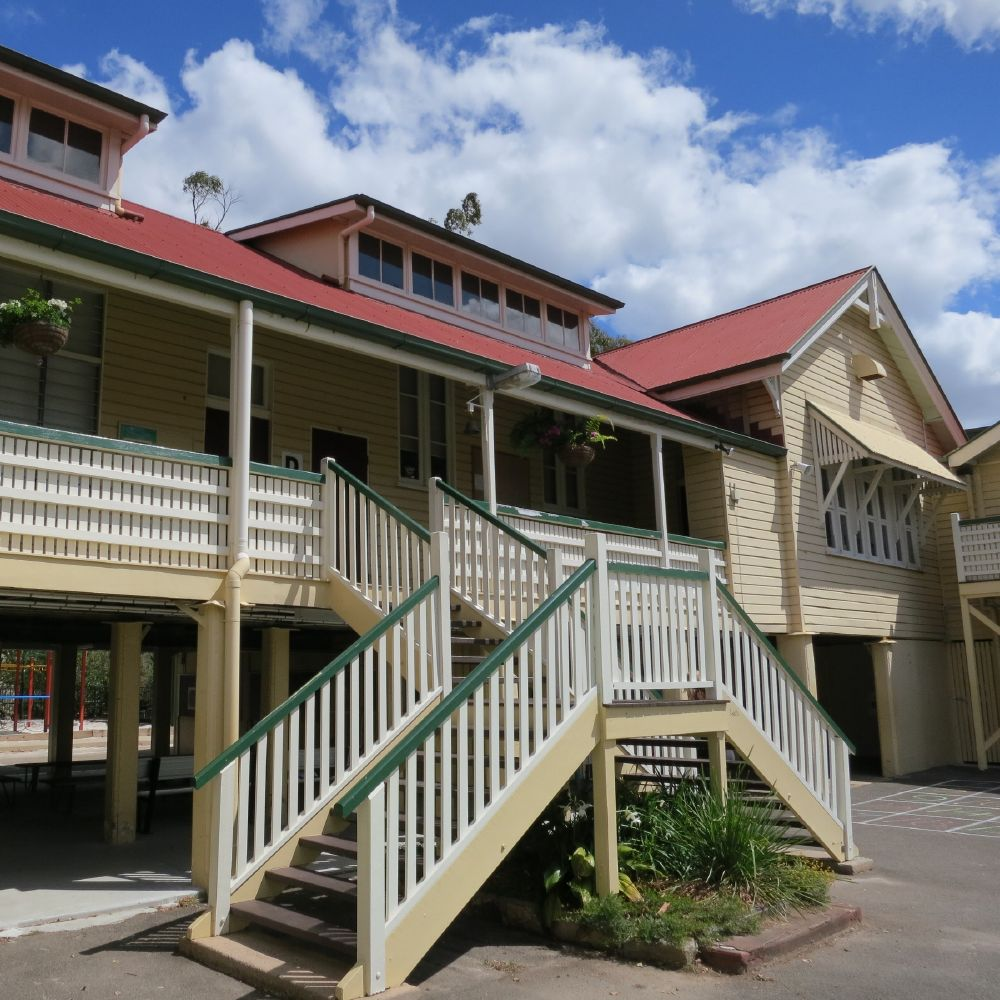
- Northern elevation of 1880 Ferguson Building, 2014

- Location within Queensland
- 27.4817°S 152.9885°E
- Location: 50 Quinn Street (37 St Osyth Street), Toowong, City of Brisbane, Queensland, Australia

History
- Built: 1880, 1887, 1910, 1917–1924, Open–air Annexe (1917, 1924, 1927, 1930)

Site notes
- Architect(s): Robert and John Ferguson; Queensland Department of Public Works

Queensland Heritage Register
- Official name: Toowong State School
- Type: state heritage
- Designated: 28 November 2014
- Reference no.: 602845
- Type: Education, research, scientific facility: School-state
- Theme: Educating Queenslanders: Providing primary schooling
- Builders: NB Headland, J Macarthur, Relief work

Toowong State School is a heritage-listed state school at 50 Quinn Street (37 St Osyth Street), Toowong, City of Brisbane, Queensland, Australia. It was designed by Robert and John Ferguson and Queensland Department of Public Works and built in 1880 by NB Headland. It was added to the Queensland Heritage Register on 28 November 2014.

As of 2019, the school enrolled about 270 students, enrolled based on geographical area. It also enrolls deaf and hard of hearing children, their siblings, and children of deaf adults who do not live outside of the geographic area as part of the co-enrollment program located there.

== History ==
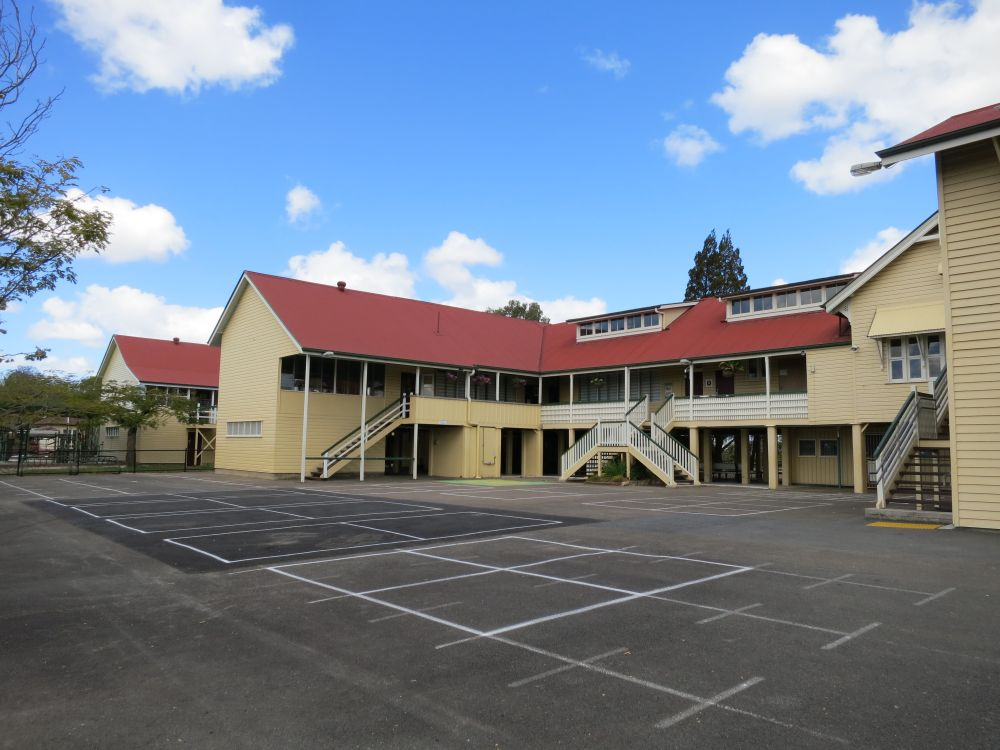
Northern elevation of school complex, 2014

Toowong State School opened on 22 January 1880, but moved to its present site between Quinn and St Osyth Streets in 1910. The original building was an 1880 Ferguson building with an 1887 addition. At its new site, a Department of Public Works designed classroom (1910), an open-air annexe (1917), and two Sectional School buildings (1924 and 1927) were added. Retaining walls were constructed as relief work in the 1930s; and mature plantings stand along the southern boundary. The school has been in continuous operation since establishment and has been a focus for the local community as a place for important social and cultural activities.

Traditionally the land of the Turrbal people, European settlement of the Toowong area began with the sale of land in the 1850s. By the 1860s the area, within three miles of Brisbane city, was noted for its detached villas on large suburban allotments along the river and on its ridges, and was favoured as a residential area by Brisbane's elite. With the extension of the railway line to Ipswich via Toowong in 1875, the settlement grew rapidly. Subdivision of large properties for residential development began and the area's growth led to the proclamation of Toowong Shire in 1880.

With Toowong's rising population came demand for education in the area. A site in Aston Street was offered for sale to the Toowong State School Committee by architect Richard Gailey for £300 with a donation of £150. The remaining money required for the construction of a school building and a teacher's residence was raised by the local community. The new school (buildings and land), costing a total of £1162 14s, was constructed by contractor NB Headland and opened on the 22 January 1880. Pupils came from great distances, including from Indooroopilly, Milton, and across the river from West End.

The provision of state-administered education was important to the colonial governments of Australia. National schools were established in 1848 in New South Wales and continued in Queensland following the colony's creation in 1859. After the introduction of the Education Act 1860, Queensland's public schools grew from four in 1860 to 230 by 1875. The State Education Act 1875 provided for free, compulsory and secular primary education and the establishment of the Department of Public Instruction. This further standardised the provision of education, and despite difficulties, achieved the remarkable feat of bringing basic literacy to most Queensland children by 1900.

The establishment of schools was considered an essential step in the development of early communities and integral to their success. Locals often donated land and labour for a school's construction and the school community contributed to maintenance and development. Schools became a community focus, a symbol of progress, and a source of pride, with enduring connections formed with past pupils, parents, and teachers. The inclusion of war memorials and community halls reinforced these connections and provided a venue for a wide range of community events in schools across Queensland.

The first building at Toowong State School was built to a standard plan supplied by the Queensland Government. From the 1860s until the 1960s, Queensland school buildings were predominantly timber-framed, an easy and cost-effective approach that also enabled the government to provide facilities in remote areas. Standard designs were continually refined in response to changing needs and educational philosophy and Queensland school buildings were particularly innovative in climate control, lighting, and ventilation. Standardisation produced distinctly similar schools across Queensland with complexes of typical components.

In 1879 the Department of Public Instruction appointed its own Superintendent of Buildings to be responsible for the design of all government schools, the first appointee being the builder-architect Robert Ferguson. Ferguson immediately revised the design of schools to address deficiencies in ventilation and lighting and this period of school design was pivotal in this regard. Ferguson introduced tall and decorative ventilation spires to the roof and louvred panels to the gable apex to vent the classrooms. Additional and larger windows were incorporated with high sill heights that did not allow draughts and sunlight to enter the room. The overall form was lowset on brick piers and in larger schools multiple classrooms were arranged symmetrically around a parade ground. The designs remained single-skin to eliminate "receptacles for germs and vermin" but were lined externally rather than internally to address the previous weathering problem. Importantly, Ferguson's buildings were decoratively-treated with a variety of elaborate timber work and were heralded by educationalists as 'far superior in design, material and workmanship to any we have before built.

In 1885 Robert Ferguson was replaced as Superintendent of Buildings by his brother John Ferguson who continued to implement his brother's designs until John's death in 1893, when responsibility for school buildings passed back to the Department of Public Works. The Ferguson period (1879–1893) is distinct and marked by extensive redesign of school buildings including associated structures and furniture. The Ferguson brothers' designs were reflective of education requirements of the time, responsive to criticism of previous designs, revolutionary in terms of internal environmental quality, technically innovative, popular and successful and provided a long-lasting legacy of good educational design.

The school building at Toowong State School was built to a standard Ferguson design. It was constructed to accommodate 154 children, but could comfortably seat 200. An article published in the Brisbane Courier at the time praised it as a model for future school buildings in the colony.

The lowset teaching building was described as being 50 by 18 feet (15.2 m × 5.5 m), with a 35-by-18-foot (10.7 m × 5.5 m) cross wing at one end, and 8-foot (2.4 m) wide verandas. Ventilation and light was provided by windows in the side and gable end walls. Ventilators at the apex of each gable encouraged airflow. The exposed internal framework, made from ironbark, was dressed and stop chamfered to give the interiors a "neat and finished appearance in the absence of lining". The wall cladding was 6-by-1-inch (152 mm × 25 mm) beech chamferboards, which were wrought and beaded on the inside. Floors, platforms and the infants' gallery, which was located in the cross wing, were constructed of white-ant resistant beech wood, supported on ironbark joists and bearers. The roof was clad in ironbark shingles, which were expected to last 25 years.

The school was extended in 1887 with the addition of another large classroom of a similar Ferguson design. It had the additional feature of a washroom attached to the verandah, which was later altered and enlarged to become the Principal's office. The tender of £406 for the construction of the new building was won by contractors Bromaby and Bowden in October 1886. The new classroom darkened the interior of the earlier classrooms, but this was alleviated when dormer windows were added in 1907.

Toowong experienced sustained growth into the twentieth century. On 19 August 1903 Toowong was declared to be the Town of Toowong under the provision of the Local Authorities Act 1902. In the same year, the tram service extended to the Toowong Cemetery and later along Dean Street and Woodstock Road to a terminus. By 1911 the population of the Toowong municipality was 6286, up 45% from 1891.

The growth of Toowong State School and the need for a more conveniently placed school for Toowong pupils, after the opening of schools at Milton and Indooroopilly, led to the suggestion that the school be moved. In 1909 an elevated 2-acre site (0.81ha) in a more central location, between Quinn and St Osyth streets, was proposed as suitable for increased facilities and to accommodate 450 pupils. Subsequently, in June 1910, a tender by J Macarthur for £1565 was accepted by the government for the re-erection of the school on its new site and for the construction of an additional teaching building.

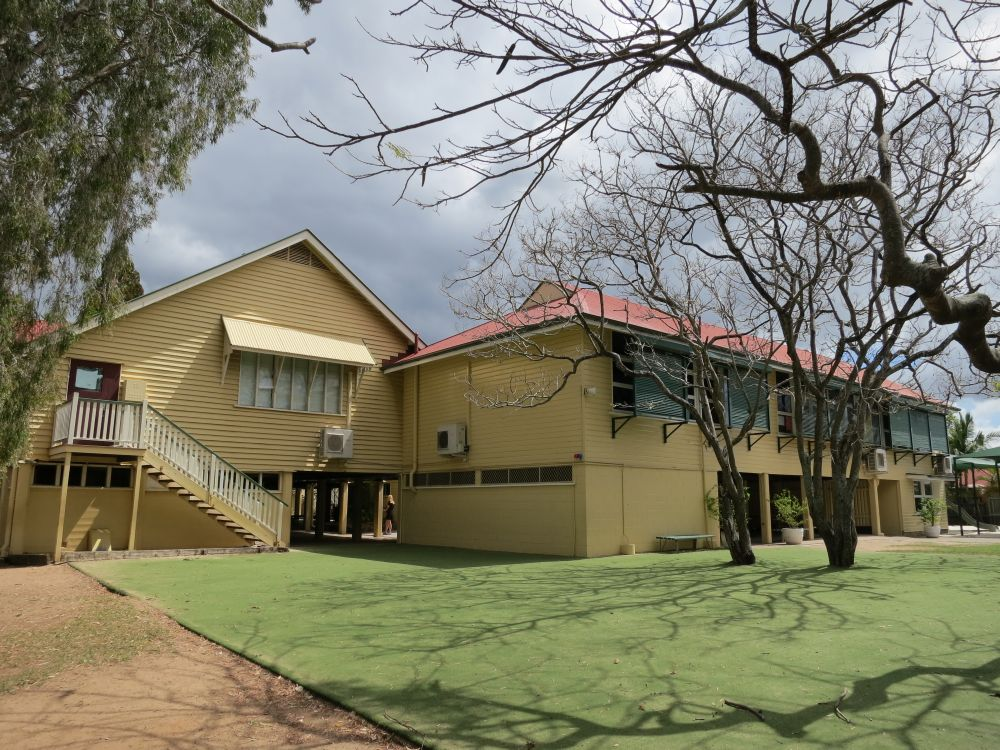
Intersection of 1910 DPW building (left) and 1917 Open-air Annexe (right), 2014

The building constructed on the new site in 1910 was a standard design (Type C/T2) by the Department of Public Works, which retained responsibility for schools until 2013. Under the Department's stewardship, and through the involvement of some of Queensland's most innovative architects, school buildings became more advanced and diverse. A period of marked experimentation in school design occurred between 1893 and 1914, with a primary focus on improving the natural light and ventilation of classroom interiors. Various combinations of roof ventilators and ducting; ceiling and wall vents; and larger windows of varying sill heights and dormer windows were trialled. For timber-framed buildings, single-skin construction was favoured for its heat dissipation ability and economy. Often the building was lined on the interior rather than exterior, providing a smooth, cleanable surface that provided better interior light. The resulting externally-exposed stud framing was protected from the weather by wide verandahs, which had the added benefit of shading the building and providing makeshift teaching space. The introduction of highset buildings began in the late 1890s, providing better ventilation and additional teaching and covered play space underneath. This was a noticeable new direction and this form became a characteristic of Queensland schools.

The 1910 Department of Public Works building constructed at Toowong incorporated many of these new design features. It was highset with space beneath the building for a lavatory and water tank, as well as play space. It had a roof ridge ventilator and wider windows with lower sills to provide better light and ventilation. The width of the building was greater than the Ferguson buildings, 25 feet (7.6 m), and hat enclosures were provided at the ends of the verandahs.

The school began operating from its new site in September 1910 and all works were completed in the following year. The Hon. EH Macartney, Minister for Lands, in the absence of the Minister for Education, officially opened the school in May 1911. Additional land on the corner of Quinn Street and Sylvan Road was purchased in 1912, intended for playing fields, however few improvements were made to the site until the early 1950s when tennis courts were constructed.

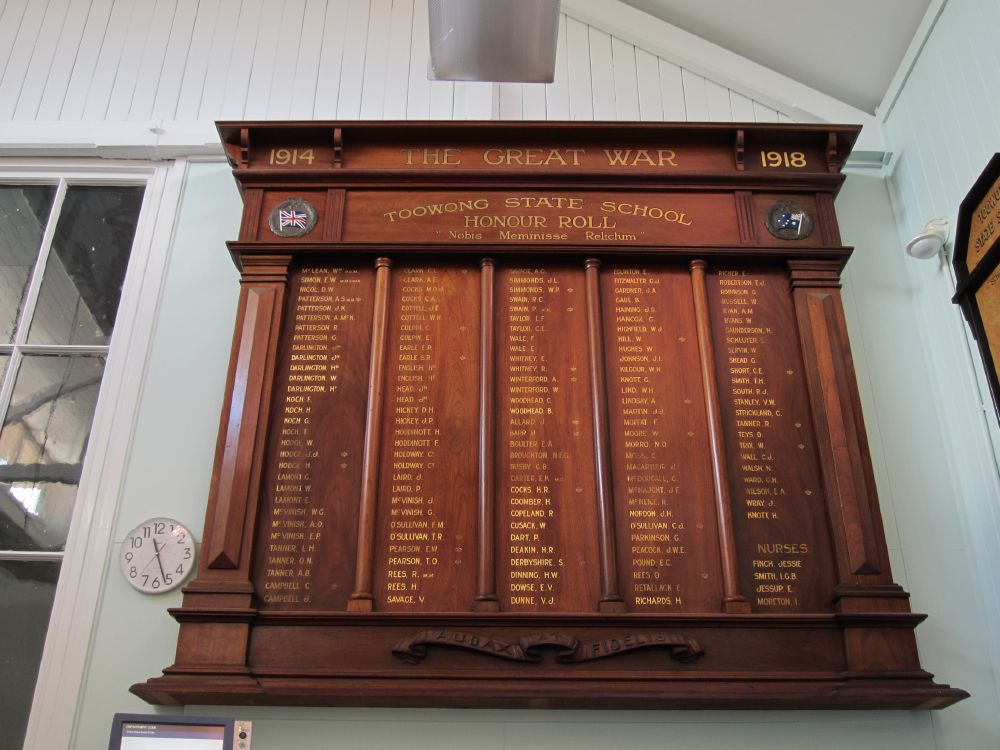
Honour board, 2014

During World War I two additions were made to the school. A cedar honour board commemorating 115 former pupils and teachers who served during World War I was unveiled at the school in 1917 by EH Macartney MLA. For the total cost of £30, Messrs Patterson constructed the board and H Barker completed the writing. Now housed in the library (the 1880 Ferguson building), the honour board was the site of wreath laying at ANZAC Day commemorations.

Secondly, the growth of Toowong State School's enrolments to more than 500 children prompted the construction of an additional building, in the form of an open-air annexe, in 1917. Open-air annexes were introduced as a standard design in 1913 by the Department of Public Instruction. This design was developed in response to the contemporary medical belief, advocated by Dr Eleanor Bourne the first Medical Inspector of Schools from 1911, that adequate ventilation and high levels of natural light were necessary for child health; coupled with the need to build inexpensive, portable schools. Accordingly, school architecture evolved through iteration and experimentation to improve interior light and ventilation. The open-air annexe achieved maximum ventilation and natural light; it contained only one large room and had only one wall, the western verandah wall. The other sides were open with only adjustable canvas blinds for enclosure. Ideally, they were high-set, thereby increasing the ventilation and providing further shelter underneath. The design was praised by educationalists as conducive to the health of pupils.

Officially opened by the Minister for Public Instruction, The Hon. H F Hardacre, on 8 September 1917, the open-air annexe was located at the eastern end of the school complex, linked to the 1910 Department of Public Works building by its verandah. It was a standard design, highset with a west-facing verandah and timber brackets supporting the wall posts of the remaining three sides. It contained a single 25 feet (7.6 m) wide classroom and featured a coved ceiling of pressed metal. A ventilation flap was included along the base of the verandah wall.

Although many open-air annexes were constructed across Queensland, they proved to be inadequate and were discontinued in 1923. The open sides provided limited weather protection, better climate control was needed, and the canvas blinds deteriorated quickly. All open-air annexes in Queensland were modified to provide better enclosure. Accordingly, in 1924 the open-air annexe at Toowong was enclosed and casement windows installed in the exterior walls.

During the 1920s, the school population continued to rise towards its 1927 peak of 895 pupils. As the school could only accommodate 570 pupils and enrolment was expected to rise to 700 in 1924, an additional wing and improvements to the school grounds were requested in November 1923.

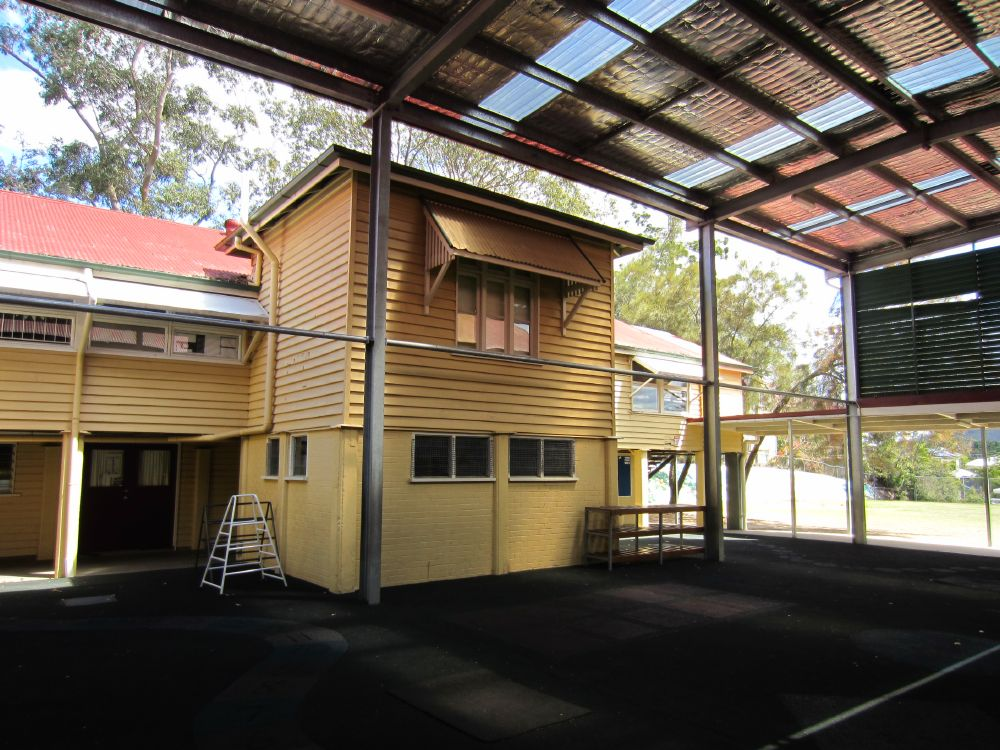
Northern elevation of 1924 Sectional School building, 2014

In 1924 and again in 1927 teaching buildings were constructed at Toowong State School to a standard design by the Department of Public Works. These buildings were of a type called the Sectional School. Improvements to achieve an optimum classroom culminated in 1920 with the Sectional School type, a highset timber structure. This fundamentally new design combined all the best features of previous types and implemented theories of an ideal education environment. It proved very successful and was used unaltered until 1950. This type was practical, economical, and satisfied educational requirements and climatic needs. Most importantly, it allowed for the orderly expansion of schools over time. By late 1914, in accordance with the accepted principles, buildings were optimally orientated to maximise natural light from the south. Before the Sectional School, solar orientation was not a key consideration and all school buildings were positioned in relation to the street and property boundaries. The Sectional School type had only one verandah typically on the northern side, allowing the southern wall, with a maximum number of windows, to be unobstructed. The building was designed so that the blank end wall could be detached as the school grew and the building extended in sections, hence the name. This led to the construction of long narrow buildings of many classrooms - a distinctive feature of Queensland schools.

The two Sectional School buildings at Toowong were constructed at the western end of the school complex, connected by verandahs to the 1880 Ferguson building to form a U-shaped courtyard. Due to the slope of the school grounds at that time, the buildings were lowset along the courtyard side, accessed by short flights of steps. Both contained three classrooms with a verandah along the courtyard side, however, the proportions were slightly different, with the 1927 building (north) being longer and narrower than the 1924 building (south). The 1924 building had an attached teachers' room and an additional verandah along its eastern side, and both buildings had hat room enclosures on their verandahs. Windows were banks of casements with fanlights.

As part of the government's unemployment relief program during the Great Depression, extensive work was carried out on the school grounds in the 1930s. This program began in 1932 when newly elected Queensland Premier William Forgan-Smith instituted a capital works program focussed on building modern infrastructure to provide relief work for unemployed Queenslanders. The "improvement" of schools was a primary aspect of the scheme. The relief work program ended in 1938, transitioning into a permanent, long-term, capital works program.

Extensive funding was given for school grounds improvement work, including fencing, and general ground levelling for play areas involving terracing and retaining walls. This work also created many large, flat school ovals within school grounds, which prior to this period, were mostly cleared of trees but not landscaped. These then became a standard inclusion within Queensland state schools and a characteristic element.

At Toowong State School relief work included levelling the school grounds, raising the school buildings, replacing all wooden stumps with concrete, and installing sewerage. Concrete retaining walls around the school perimeter were constructed between 1932 and 1935. Dangerous trees were removed from the school grounds and replaced with shade trees under a planting programme running from the 1930s until at least 1980. These works provided the pupils with more playing and sitting areas underneath the now highset school buildings, as well as resolving the issue of massive water runoff onto neighbouring properties caused by siting the school on the crest of a hill.

World War II brought the connection of electricity and the telephone to the school, when No. 53 Squadron Air Training Corps was given permission to use three school rooms, two nights a week.

In c. 1945 the teaching buildings at Toowong State School were altered to improve lighting and ventilation. The dormer windows of the 1880 Ferguson building were enlarged; windows in the gable end walls of both Ferguson buildings were widened and lowered so that the sill was 3 feet (0.91 m) above the floor, with sun hoods modified accordingly; and sun hoods were added to the windows of the former open-air annexe. Other changes at this time included the removal of seating galleries in the Ferguson buildings, modification to some doors, and the installation of folding partitions between classrooms in the 1927 Sectional School.

Like many suburbs of Brisbane, Toowong's population grew after World War II, as the nation experienced unprecedented population growth, and changes to the school reflected this. Two new classrooms, a health room and tuckshop were added, while the office and some classrooms were remodelled. There were more improvements to the school grounds. Thirty-four perches (860 sq m) of land were purchased to extend the school "paddock" in 1946. Two tennis courts built on the lower playing fields for £1,500 were officially opened in 1951 by Nigel Drury, MHR.

During the 1950s and 1960s, the school was enlarged by adding an extra classroom each on the northern sides of the 1887 Ferguson building and the former open-air annexe. These extensions were clad externally to match the original buildings and had banks of wide awning windows. Internally, they were lined with flat sheeting and the windows in the former end walls were removed. The 1924 Sectional School building was extended at both ends, its eastern verandah enclosed and the internal partitions modified to create three larger classrooms. Other modifications dating from this period include the addition of an office to the eastern verandah of the 1887 Ferguson building and the extension of its attached teacher's room, the insertion of partitions in the 1887 Ferguson and 1910 Department of Public Works buildings to create smaller classrooms, replacement of timber balustrades with bagracks, extension of verandahs and the addition and relocation of some stairs.

The 1970s were a time of upgrading school facilities. Between 1970 and 1974, reconstruction, drainage and grassing of the top oval occurred, as well as the levelling and grassing of the infants' play area, and the construction of gym towers, platforms and sandpits. More trees were planted and gardens created in the grounds and seats added to the playground. Electricity was installed in each classroom and the library, housed in the 1880 Ferguson building, was upgraded and extended.

Centenary celebrations were held in 1980 with a centenary ball, walkathon, fete and reunion day and sports day, as well as the publication of a school history. A new school gate to St Osyth Street was constructed, opened on 29 June 1980 by the Honourable Dr Llew Edwards, MLA, Deputy Premier and Treasurer of Queensland, and a time capsule was buried on the northern side of the 1880 Ferguson building, to be retrieved in 2030.

Other changes to the school buildings over time include the relocation of doors and internal partitions; replacement of early windows with large banks of glass louvres or awning windows; the enclosure of some verandahs to extend classroom space; and the enclosure of parts of the understory area to create toilets, store rooms and additional classrooms. Recently, a basketball court at the western end of the school grounds was replaced by a sports hall.

In 2001, Toowang State School became the home of the first co-enrollment program for deaf and hard of hearing students (DHH) in Australia. It was chosen because of its small population (approximately 270 students) and the school administration's interest in working with the Deaf community. This program teaches DHH students alongside hearing peers in a combination of English and Auslan.

The program expanded over the following decade. By 2017, the school consisted of 10% deaf and hard of hearing students, 17% hearing siblings of deaf children, and 5% children of deaf adults.

As of 2017, the school continues to operate from the site established in 1910 and is the only state primary school in Toowong. The school retains early buildings constructed between 1880 and 1927, Depression-era landscaping and mature plantings. The school has served the community since 1880 and taught generations of Toowong students. Since establishment it has been a key social focus for the Toowong community with the grounds and buildings having been the location of many social events.

== Description ==
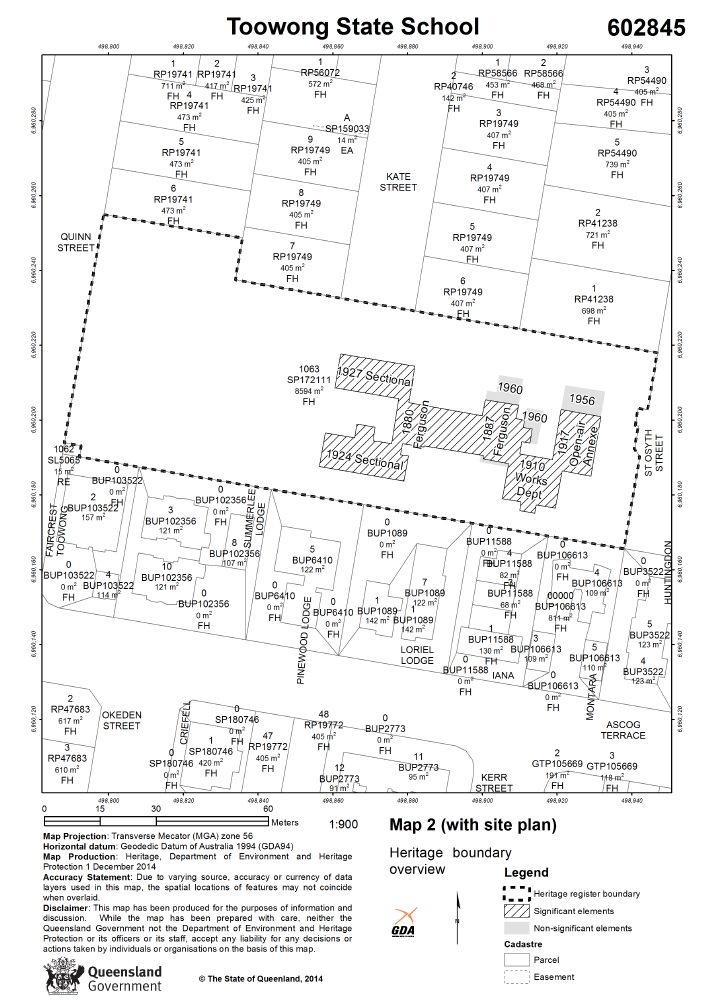
Map showing layout of the buildings at the school, 2014

Toowong State School occupies a 0.86ha site on a hilltop in Toowong, bounded by St Osyth Street to the east, residential properties to the south, Quinn Street to the west, and residential properties and the end of Kate Street to the north. The school buildings stand at the eastern end of the property with a playing field, new sports hall and a lower garden area at the western end. The levelled school grounds are edged by concrete retaining walls. The main entrance is via a brick gateway from St Osyth Street with a secondary entrance from Kate Street.

The school complex comprises six long, narrow buildings, linked together by verandahs. All are timber-framed and clad, highset on concrete stumps and accessed by timber stairs. They have a variety of roof forms, all clad in corrugated metal sheeting. From east to west, the buildings are:

- the 1917 open-air annexe
- the 1910 Department of Public Works building
- the 1887 Ferguson building
- the 1880 Ferguson building
- the 1924 (south) and 1927 (north) Sectional School buildings

The understorey is partially enclosed to form toilet blocks, storage areas and additional classrooms. Constructed at different times using a variety of materials, none of these understorey enclosures are of cultural heritage significance.

=== 1917 Open-air Annexe (enclosed 1924) ===
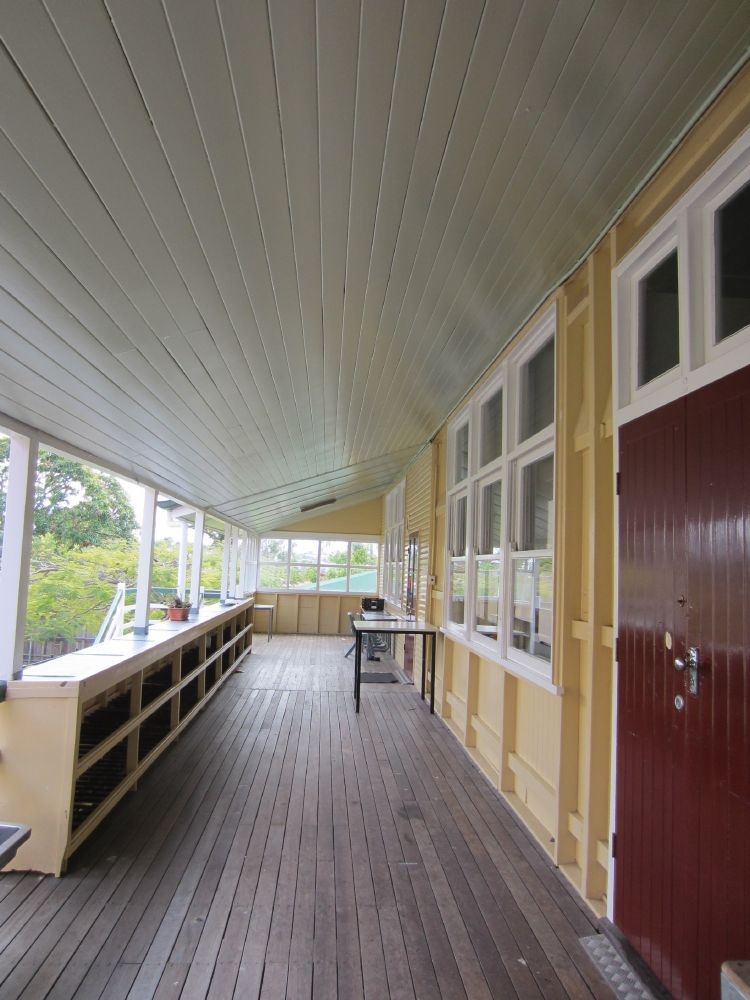
West verandah of the open-air annexe (now enclosed), 2014

The open-air annexe is orientated north–south with a west verandah. An extension to the northern end (ca.1956) is not of cultural heritage significance. The building is clad in chamferboards and has banks of timber-framed awning windows in the eastern wall. The roof form is hipped-gable at the southern end and gabled at the extended northern end.

The verandah wall is single-skin with exposed timber framing, and the raked verandah ceiling is lined with timber, tongue and groove, v-jointed boards. A timber ventilation flap at floor level survives along the verandah wall. Part of the timber, three-rail balustrade has been replaced by bagracks at the northern end. The verandah doors are timber, braced and ledged double doors with fanlights above, and windows are double-hung timber sashes.

The original large, single classroom is divided by a later single-skin timber partition to form two classrooms, connected by a timber, half-glazed double door. The walls are lined with vertical, v-jointed boards. A high, horizontal timber rail marks the height of former openings in the exterior walls. The coved ceiling is lined with decorative pressed metal and metal tie rods are exposed within the room.

=== 1910 Department of Public Works building ===
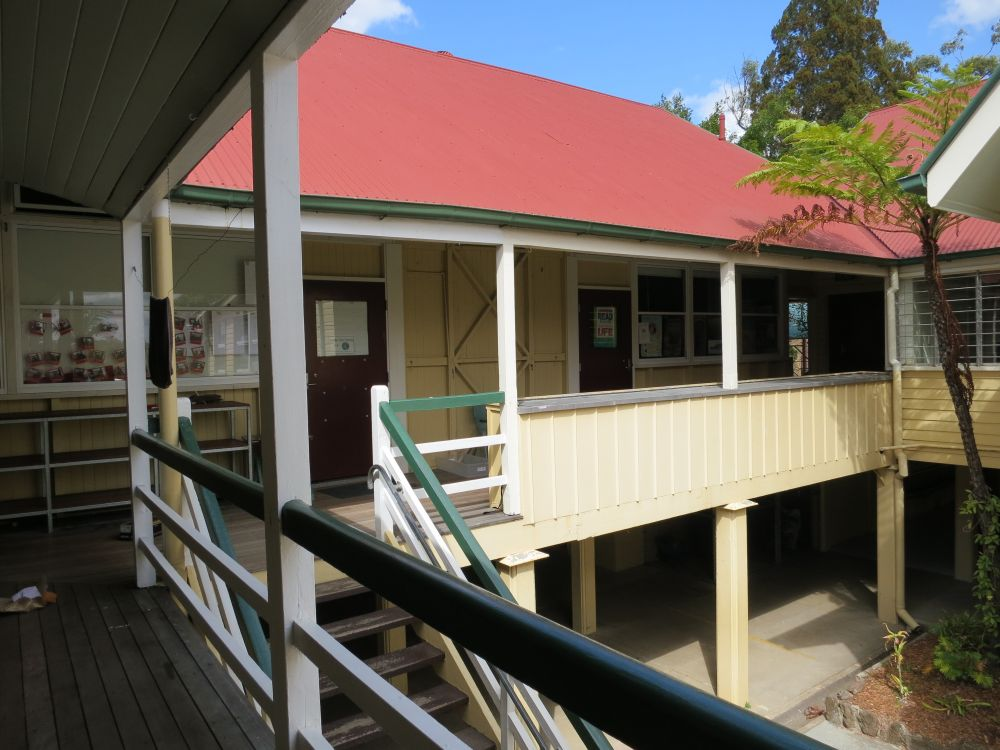
North verandah of the 1910 Dept of Public Works building, 2014

The 1910 Department of Public Works building is orientated east–west with a north verandah and an enclosed south verandah with a projecting teachers' room. It is clad in weatherboards and has a gable roof. The gable end walls feature triangular, louvred ventilation panels at the apex and windows sheltered by a skillion hood with decorative window brackets. These windows are later glass louvres inserted in the original window openings. The south verandah has been enclosed with weatherboards and timber-framed awning windows. The former teachers' room has early windows in the southern wall, which are individual, timber-framed, horizontally centre-pivoting windows. These retain a window hood with decorative timber brackets.

The north verandah has a raked ceiling lined with v-jointed tongue and groove boards; a single-skin verandah wall with exposed framing and a section of cross bracing (in the location of a former door); and part of its timber, three rail balustrade has been replaced by bagracks. All windows and doors are later replacements. Part of the northwest corner of the building has been removed to allow a connection between the verandah and a walkway along the southern side of the adjacent 1887 Ferguson building. The walls of the removed section are lined with flat sheeting and a half-glazed double door opens on to the walkway.

The original large single classroom of the interior is divided into two classrooms by a later partition lined with flat sheeting with cover strips. The walls and coved ceiling are lined with v-jointed tongue and groove boards. The ceiling has square lattice ceiling vents and metal tie rods are exposed in the space. Doors and windows have been removed from the south verandah wall and new doorways created, however the original window framing and sills remain.

The enclosed south verandah has a single-skin verandah wall with a section of cross bracing in the location of a former door. Rows of metal hat hooks are attached to this wall below the former windows. The raked verandah ceiling is lined with v-jointed boards. The former hat enclosures at either end of the verandah remain, indicated by the single-skin walls with exposed framing. The teacher's room is lined with v-jointed boards on the walls and coved ceiling, which has a square lattice ventilation panel.

=== 1887 Ferguson building ===
The 1887 Ferguson building is aligned north–south with verandahs on its long sides. It has a gable roof and is clad in chamferboards. Extensions to the north end of the building (1960, containing a staff room), to the eastern verandah and former teachers' room (ca.1960, containing offices), and a ca.1950s walkway and awning along the south facade are not of cultural heritage significance.

The south gable end wall has a triangular, louvred ventilation panel at its apex (boarded over), eaves lined with diagonal timber boards, and decorative eaves brackets. The western verandah has a raked ceiling lined with diagonal timber beaded boards above exposed rafters, some stop-chamfered verandah posts, and a balustrade of bagracks. It connects at the southern end to the 1881 Ferguson building via a passageway with an early double door and fanlight. The eastern verandah is mostly enveloped by an extension but is discernible by its chamferboard cladding (made internal by the extension). The former teachers' room has a coved ceiling lined with timber boards.

The building retains three sets of original tall, vertically centre-pivoting windows in the side walls. Windows in the southern wall have been replaced by glass louvres with a section of awning windows above. One early, half-glazed double door with tall, vertically centre-pivoting fanlights survives in its original position in the centre of the west wall. The opposite door has a similar fanlight and a later door.

The interior walls are lined with vertical v-jointed boards, with some areas of flat sheeting. The gable end walls are only lined up to the height of the side walls, revealing the original single-skin construction above. Abutting an extension, the north gable end wall retains a louvred ventilation panel and a section of later windows despite no longer being an exterior wall. The raked ceilings are lined with diagonal, wide, beaded timber boards, and the exposed Queen post roof trusses have decorative features including stop-chamfered edges and turned timber pendants.

=== 1880 Ferguson building ===
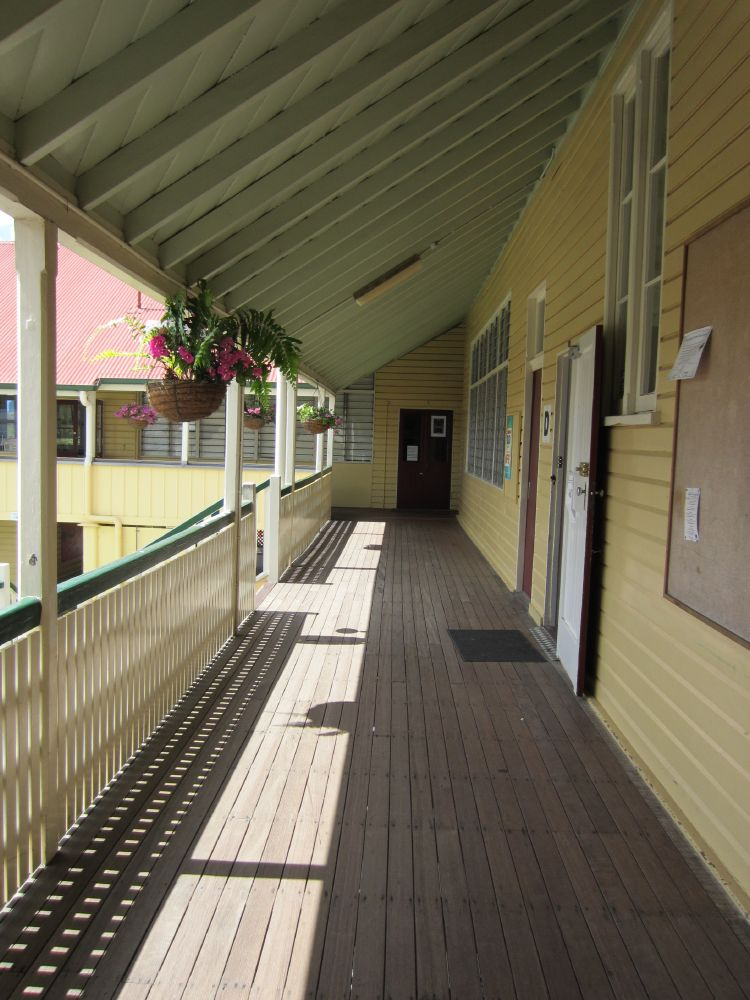
Northern verandah of 1880 Ferguson Building, 2014

The 1880 Ferguson building has a T-shaped plan accommodating two large classrooms: an eastern classroom orientated east–west with a north verandah and enclosed south verandah; and a western classroom orientated north–south with an enclosed west verandah. The building is clad in chamferboards and the gable roof has four long dormer windows over the eastern classroom. The gable end walls of the western classroom have banks of early awning windows; skillion window hoods with decorative brackets; decorative timberwork such as eaves brackets; and small ventilation panels at the gable apex.

The north verandah has a timber balustrade; stop-chamfered verandah posts and beams; and a raked ceiling lined with diagonal wide timber beaded boards above exposed rafters. Original tall, vertically centre-pivoting windows survive at the western end of the verandah wall. Also at the western end is a former hat room enclosure with metal hooks attached to the walls. The enclosed south verandah retains stop-chamfered verandah posts and beams, and a raked ceiling lined with diagonal timber beaded boards above exposed rafters. The enclosed western verandah retains a raked ceiling lined with diagonal timber beaded boards above exposed rafters; rows of metal hooks mounted to the verandah wall; and remnant walls of a former hatroom at the northern end.

The interiors of both classrooms are lined with vertical, v-jointed, tongue and groove boards and have raked ceilings lined with diagonal beaded boards above exposed Queen post trusses. The ceiling of the eastern classroom also has dormer windows and horizontal sections lined with v-jointed boards. The gable end walls of the western classroom are only lined up to the height of the side walls, revealing the original single-skin construction above. An early glazed partition and door separates the two classrooms. Mounted on the wall next to this partition is a large cedar memorial Honour Board, listing the names of former students and teachers who served in World War I. A timber, single-skin partition has been inserted at the northern end of the western classroom, creating a passageway between the north and west verandahs.

=== 1924 and 1927 Sectional School buildings ===
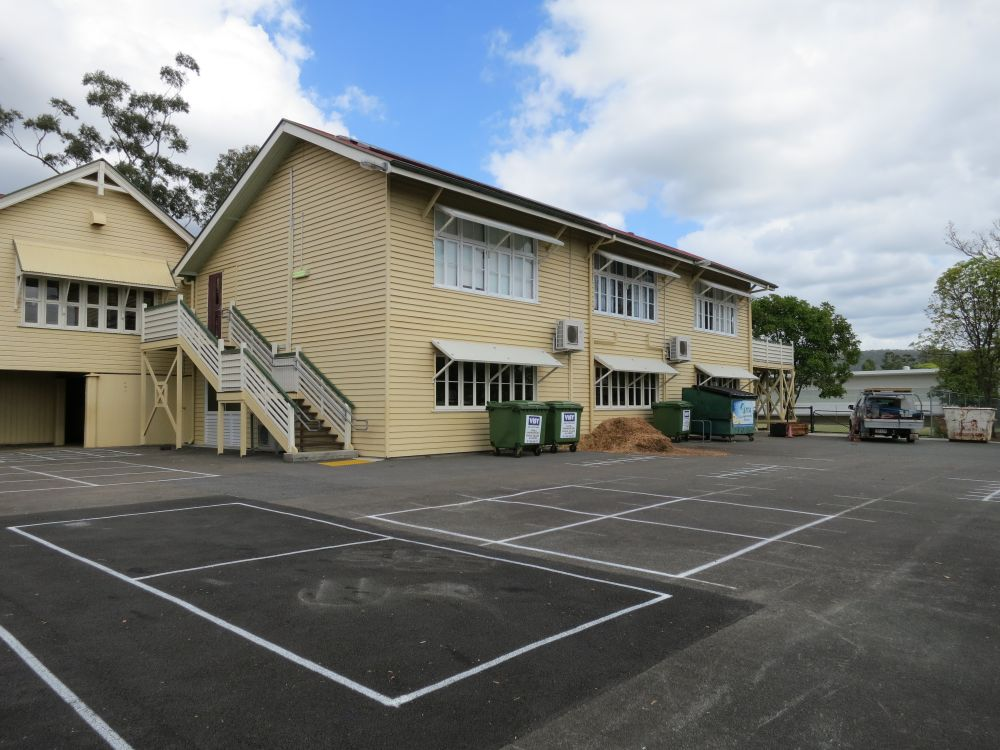
Northern elevation of 1927 Sectional School building, 2014

The Sectional School buildings are both aligned east–west with enclosed verandahs along one side, casement windows along the other, and blank end walls. They have gable roofs and are clad in weatherboards with packed boards in the gable ends walls to provide ventilation. The attached teacher's room on the north side of the 1924 building has a hipped roof, early casement windows and a skillion window hood with battened timber brackets. A single casement window is also located on the southern wall of the 1927 building where a former hat room enclosure survives.

The 1924 building, which was extended at either end in ca.1960, contains three classrooms. The walls are lined with timber, v-jointed tongue and groove boards and one early, single-skin, timber partition wall remains. The central and western classrooms have a coved ceiling lined with v-jointed boards, with exposed metal tie rods and square lattice ceiling vents. The eastern classroom has a flat ceiling lined with flat sheeting. The former verandah wall, which has had large openings cut into it, is single-skin with some sections of cross bracing. The verandah ceiling and the walls and ceiling of the attached teacher's room are all lined with v-jointed boards.

The 1927 building also contains three classrooms, with the walls and coved ceiling lined with v-jointed boards. The ceiling has exposed metal tie rods and square lattice ceiling vents. Large openings have been created in the dividing partition walls and new walls built to create a smaller room in the centre of the building and larger rooms at either end. The enclosed verandah retains its ceiling lining of v-jointed boards and early double-hung sash windows survive in the single-skin verandah wall.

=== Miscellaneous ===
The school retains a collection of early school furniture and memorabilia, including brass bells. The location of a time capsule is marked by a plaque set into the ground on the northern side of the 1880 Ferguson building.

Due to the sloping terrain, high concrete retaining walls form the perimeter of the school property. These are topped by a concrete capping with an angled top. A variety of mature trees are found throughout the school grounds, particularly along the south and west boundaries. Specimens include a sausage tree (Kigelia), frangipani (Plumeria), poinciana (Delonix regia), and paperbark (possibly Melaleuca leucadendra). Views of the surrounding neighbourhood and towards the Brisbane CBD are obtained from the school buildings.

== Heritage listing ==
Toowong State School was listed on the Queensland Heritage Register on 28 November 2014 having satisfied the following criteria.

The place is important in demonstrating the evolution or pattern of Queensland's history.

Toowong State School (established in 1880 but moved to its present site in 1910) is important in demonstrating the evolution of state education and its associated architecture in Queensland.

With its complex of teaching buildings dating from the 1880s to the 1920s, the place retains excellent, representative examples of standard government designs that were architectural responses to prevailing government educational philosophies in each period. The Ferguson designed teaching buildings (1880, 1887) are important for integrating changes to improve the practicality and comfort of school buildings and were early standardised designs. The Department of Public Works designed building (1910) illustrates the improvements made to the Ferguson school type. The former open-air annexe (1917) demonstrates medical and educational theories of the period which valued adequate ventilation and natural lighting; and the two Sectional School buildings (1925, 1927) demonstrate the culmination of many years of experimental timber school design, providing equally for educational and climatic needs.

The place is important in demonstrating the principal characteristics of a particular class of cultural places.

Toowong State School is important in demonstrating the principal characteristics of an early Queensland state school complex, comprising a range of building types dating from 1880 to 1927 and incorporating later alterations to improve light and ventilation.

The place retains good, representative examples of standard government designs that were architectural responses to the prevailing government educational philosophies. In particular, the standard designs represented at Toowong are:

- two Ferguson buildings (1880 and 1887) with their large classrooms surrounded by generous verandahs with projecting teacher's rooms; decorative timberwork; ventilation features such as louvred gable vents and the addition of dormer windows; internal features such as raked ceilings with exposed queen post roof trusses; and original doors and windows
- a Department of Public Works designed building (1910) with its highset form; wider plan; generous verandahs with attached teacher's room and former hat room enclosures; ventilation features such as louvred gable vents; coved ceiling and early windows
- an open-air annexe (1917, enclosed 1924), with its highset, timber-framed construction; west-facing verandah; single-skin verandah wall with ventilation flap; timber internal wall linings, and coved, pressed metal ceiling with iron tie rods
- two Sectional School buildings (1924 and 1927) with their gable roofs; verandah along one side; large banks of windows along the opposite side; coved ceiling with metal tie beams and ventilation panels; and subsequent classroom expansion

The place has a strong or special association with a particular community or cultural group for social, cultural or spiritual reasons.

Queensland schools have always played an important part in Queensland communities. They typically retain significant and enduring connections with former pupils, parents, and teachers; provide a venue for social interaction and volunteer work; and are a source of pride, symbolising local progress and aspirations. Toowong State School has a strong and ongoing association with the Toowong community. It was established through the efforts of the people of the suburb and has educated generations of Toowong children. The place is important for its contribution to the educational development of Toowong and is a prominent community focal point and gathering place for social events, with widespread community support.

== See also ==
- List of schools in Greater Brisbane
- History of state education in Queensland
