= Sugata Mitra =

Indian computer scientist and educational theorist

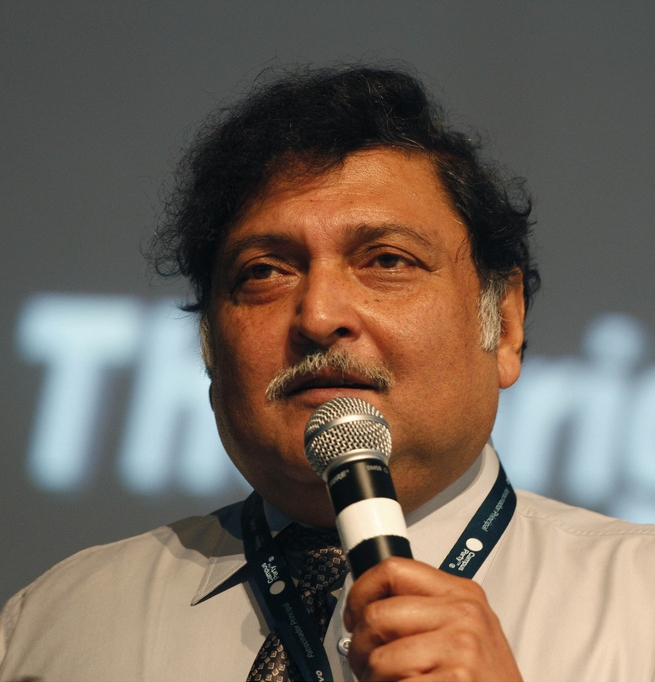
- Born: Sugata Mitra; 12 February 1952 (age 74); Calcutta, West Bengal, India
- Occupation: Professor
- Known for: Hole in the Wall project

Sugata Mitra (born 12 February 1952) is an Indian computer scientist and educational theorist. He is best known for his "Hole in the Wall" experiment, and widely cited in works on literacy and education. He is Professor Emeritus at NIIT University, Rajasthan, India. A Ph.D. in theoretical physics, he retired in 2019 as Professor of Educational Technology at Newcastle University in England, after 13 years there including a year in 2012 as visiting professor at MIT Media Lab in Cambridge, Massachusetts, USA. He won the TED Prize 2013.

== Background ==
Mitra was born in a Bengali family in Calcutta, India on 12 February 1952.

== Early scientific work ==
After earning a PhD in Solid State Physics from the Indian Institute of Technology (IIT), Delhi, during which time he published several papers on organic semiconductors, he went on to research battery technology at the Centre for Energy Studies in the IIT, and later at the Technische Universität, Vienna. He published a paper on a zinc-chlorine battery and a speculative paper on why the human sense organs are located where they are.

He then worked setting up networked computers and created the "Yellow Pages" industry in India and Bangladesh.

== Education and cognitive science studies ==
Mitra is a leading proponent of Minimally invasive education. He has a PhD in Physics but is credited with more than 25 inventions in the area of cognitive science and education technology. He was conferred the Dewang Mehta Award for Innovation in Information Technology in the year 2005. In September 2012 Mitra won the Leonardo European Corporate Learning Award in the "Crossing Border" category. He argued that broken connections in simulated neural networks are a model for Alzheimer's disease (The effect of synaptic disconnection on bi-directional associative recall. S. Mitra, Proc. IEEE/SMC Conf., Vol.1, 989, 1994 USA).

Mitra's work at NIIT created the first curricula and pedagogy for that organisation, followed by years of research on learning styles, learning devices, several of them now patented, multimedia and new methods of learning. Since the 1970s, Professor Mitra's publications and work has resulted in training and development of perhaps a million young Indians, amongst them some of the poorest children in the world. Some of this work culminated in an interest in early literacy, and the Hole in the Wall experiments.

== TED Talk ==
On 3 May 2013, Mitra's TED Talk "Build a School in the Cloud" was featured in NPR's TED Radio hour on "Unstoppable Learning". In the program, Mitra discusses the "Hole in the Wall" experiment. Mitra claimed that children in the rural slums of India, many of whom had never seen a computer in their lives had, when left with computers in kiosks, taught themselves everything from "character mapping" to advanced topics such as "DNA replication" on their own, without adult assistance. He suggested this would lead to "unstoppable learning" through a "worldwide cloud" – where children would pool their knowledge and resources in the absence of adult supervision to create a world of self-promoted learning.

Mitra's statement that school is obsolete emphasizes the stagnancy of the system of education. He explains that the original Victorian academic priorities were made as such to fit the needs of the time period in regards to producing future generations of competent members of society; “[Students] must have good handwriting, because the data is handwritten; they must be able to read; and they must be able to do multiplication, division, addition and subtraction in their head”. When the modern era is so equipped with technology that can be used to the advantage of both educators and their students it is imperative that the schooling system adapts the way society has. Mitra's SOLE model emphasizes minimally invasive methods of teaching where broad questions are asked and students are forced to use collaborative skills, and active problem solving techniques to form hypotheses and come to conclusions on their own. His modern approach additionally perfectly emphasizes many useful academic skills; most notably creativity and innovation as well as communication and collaboration.

Mitra was the TED Prize winner in 2013.

== Hole in the Wall ==
External videos
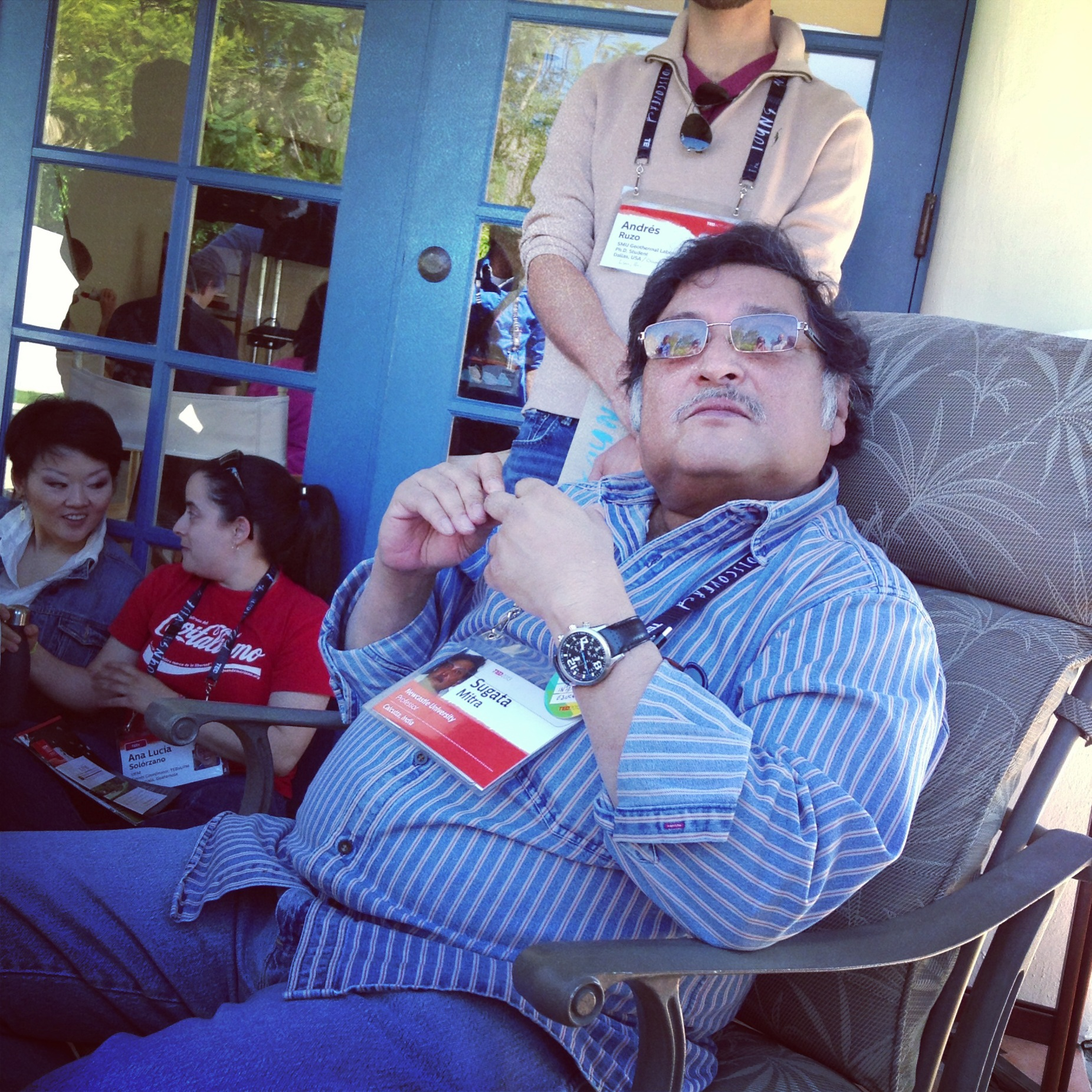
- Sugata Mitra explaining the Hole in Wall after winning the TED Prize.
- The Hole in the Wall Experiment, a TED talk, 2007
- The Child-Driven Education, a TED talk, 2010
- Build a School in the Cloud, a TED talk, 2013

In 1999, the Hole in the Wall (HIW) experiments in children's learning, was first conducted. In the initial experiment, a computer was placed in a kiosk in a wall in a slum at Kalkaji, Delhi and children were allowed to use it freely. The experiment aimed at proving that children could be taught by computers very easily without any formal training. Mitra termed this Minimally Invasive Education (MIE). The experiment has since been repeated. HIW placed some 23 kiosks in rural India. In 2004 the experiment was carried out in Cambodia.

This work demonstrated that groups of children, irrespective of who or where they are, can learn to use computers and the Internet on their own with public computers in open spaces such as roads and playgrounds, even without knowing English. Mitra's publication was judged the best open access publication in the world for 2005 and he was awarded the Dewang Mehta Award for innovation in IT that year.

The Hole in the Wall experiment inspired Indian diplomat Vikas Swarup to write his debut novel Q & A, which later became the movie Slumdog Millionaire.

=== Evaluations and criticisms ===
Critics have questioned whether leaving computers in villages results in gains in math and other skills.

In a study in Peru, with some resemblance to Sugata Mitra's studies, but many differences (number of laptops, how the pedagogic tasks were constructed etc.) Michael Trucano, found no evidence of increases in these key skills. Others see the idea as a recycling of what they see as a "Dump hardware in schools, hope for magic to happen" plan.

The long-term sustainability of the kiosk system has been questioned because they can fall into disrepair and abandonment unless the resources typical of a school are provided. UK education blogger Donald Clark has accumulated significant support indicating that the typical fate of a site is abuse and abandonment, unless it is inside a sanctuary such as a school. Moreover, Clark found that the computers were dominated by bigger boys, excluding girls and younger students, and were mostly used for entertainment not education.

In a Wired magazine article, it was claimed that a 12-year-old child – Paloma Noyola Bueno – who lived in a Mexican slum, topped the all Mexico Maths exam after her school teacher, Sergio Juarez Correa, implemented Mitra's teaching method in the classroom. It was also suggested that her class went from 0 to 63 per cent in the excellent category on the Maths exam while failing scores went from 45 percent down to 7 per cent and may have improved on other parts of the test.
