= Co-teaching =

Co-teaching or team teaching is the division of labor between educators to plan, organize, instruct and make assessments on the same group of students, generally in a common classroom, and often with a strong focus on those teaching as a team complementing one another's particular skills or other strengths. This approach can be seen in several ways. Teacher candidates who are learning to become teachers are asked to co-teach with experienced associate teachers, whereby the classroom responsibilities are shared, and the teacher candidate can learn from the associate teacher. Regular classroom teachers and special education teachers can be paired in co-teaching relationships to benefit inclusion of students with special needs.

To evaluate the effectiveness of co-teaching, partnerships can use the Magiera-Simmons Quality Indicator Model of Co-Teaching, which gives standard definitions for co-teaching skills through 25 quality indicators and a rating scale. Co-teaching is often evaluated on the amount of shared leadership is present, the amount of co-planning time, honest communication between the two educators, and how much respect and trust is present in the relationship.

== Models ==
There are several models of co-teaching, identified by Friend and Cook (1996), including:

- One Teach, One Support: One teacher leads instruction, while the other provides support to students who need additional help or enrichment, gathers observation data, or provides classroom management.
- Parallel Teaching: Each teacher, or teacher and student teacher, plan jointly but each teaches the same information to different halves of the classroom at the same time.
- Alternative Teaching: One teacher manages most of the class while the other teacher works with a small group inside or outside of the classroom. The small group does not have to integrate with the current lesson.
- Station Teaching: Both teachers divide the instructional content, and each takes responsibility for planning and teaching part of it. In station teaching, the classroom is divided into various teaching centers. The teacher and student teacher are at particular stations; the other stations are run independently by the students or by a teacher’s aide.
- Team Teaching: Both teachers are responsible for planning and share the instruction of all students. The lessons are taught by both teachers who actively engage in conversation, not lecture, to encourage discussion by students. Both teachers are actively involved in the management of the lesson and discipline.

== Research ==
Research on the effectiveness of co-teaching has yielded mixed results.

As a delivery model for special education services, one study found important strategies were infrequently observed in this model, and the special education teacher played a subordinate role.

Another study reviewed student outcomes via a resource room model and co-teaching. It found resource room delivery superior in terms of academic progress. Other research has shown that the results of co-teaching benefit both the educators and the students. but the study lacked long-term data.

One author reviewed eight studies of students impressions of co-teaching, and found the majority preferred receiving services outside of the classroom for part of the day, noting they formed a better relationship with their special education teacher and understood content better in specialized instruction within a resource room.

== See also ==
- Education
- Right to education
- Educational technology
- Pedagogy
- Co-enrollment
