= Response to Intervention =

Educational teaching and assessment model

In education, Response to Intervention (RTI or RtI) is an academic approach used to provide early, systematic, and appropriately intensive supplemental instruction and support to children who are at risk of or currently performing below grade or age level standards. However, to better reflect the transition toward a more comprehensive approach to intervention, there has been a shift in recent years from the terminology referring to RTI to MTSS, which stands for "multi-tiered system of supports". MTSS represents the latest intervention framework that is being implemented to systematically meet the wider needs which influence student learning and performance.

== Description ==
The RTI approach encompasses tiered levels of support and interventions to adequately meet students' academic needs. It was originally developed as a method for supporting students who appear below-grade level in demonstrating academic skills and identifying students with learning disabilities. However, there has been a shift in the labeling of RTI in schools and professional literature that reflects its adoption as one of the approaches contained within the broader Multi-Tiered System of Supports (MTSS).

Within the RTI process that is embedded within the MTSS framework, instruction is differentiated using varying tiers of intervention, progress monitoring of students' performance, and flexible groupings to meet the academic needs of students. The level of support that is provided to individual students intensifies as the tiers increase in number.

Tier 1 intervention is the broadest tier of support that is provided to all general education students and covers core content and grade-level standards. Instruction and the academic supports provided in this tier should be differentiated to meet students' needs and learning styles.

Students who appear below-grade level on academic screening assessments will often qualify for Tier 2 intervention, which typically involves evidence-based interventions focused on specific content or skills, and some instruction in a small-group setting.

Students who continue to perform below grade level on benchmark assessments, and show little to no response to the Tier 2 interventions, may then be found eligible for Tier 3 intervention, which consists of either small-group, or in some cases one-to-one, instruction. Those who do not advance after receiving Tier 3 intervention(s) typically qualify for a referral to special education.

Using a tiered approach to intervention helps schools to determine students' specific instructional levels and inform instructional support. Through administering educational assessments and conducting a critical analysis of the data collected, schools can provide academic support to students at an appropriate level of intensity under the RTI framework.

== Assessment and Intervention ==
Standardized universal screeners and regular progress monitoring assessments are used to evaluate students' proficiency in core knowledge and skills (e.g., reading, mathematics), as well as determine any necessary modifications to the instruction or appropriate interventions for those appearing as below grade level.

Universal screening tools are brief standardized assessments given to all students to identify those at risk of falling below grade-level. In a similar way, more comprehensive "benchmark" standardized assessments are also administered in many schools at the beginning, middle, and end of the school year to measure students' proficiency levels on grade-level knowledge and skills in math and language arts. Using both screeners and benchmark assessments helps to systematically identify those needing additional support who may appear below grade level, or are at risk of falling below grade level, and plan appropriate interventions.

Students in Tiers 2 and 3 are often evaluated more frequently using progress monitoring assessments to assess students' progress and inform adjustments to the instruction.

== Comparison to MTSS ==
Whereas RTI focuses primarily on meeting the academic needs of students, MTSS takes into account other factors which influence student performance. A study of the nationwide implementation of MTSS reflected that many states in the U.S. are integrating MTSS to provide services to students with learning disabilities, English Language Learners, and academically advanced students. MTSS offers educators a data-based approach to assessing students' current levels of academic performance and providing targeted interventions, while also aiming to promote their holistic growth.

The systematic shift toward MTSS in schools provides educators with a framework that allows them to target a more diverse range of students' academic, behavioral, and social-emotional needs by using data to inform intensive instructional supports and interventions. MTSS has been adopted nationally as an umbrella term to reference a multi-tiered and more whole-child approach to meeting students' learning needs and supporting all areas of their development. Whereas RTI focuses on providing tiered academic interventions, MTSS delivers a more comprehensive approach. As MTSS integrates components of both the RTI and Positive Behavioral Interventions and Supports (PBIS) frameworks, it produces challenges for schools to successfully balance and employ to improve student outcomes. However, when implemented with fidelity and uses of best practices to support students across grade levels and subject areas, this framework can yield positive academic and behavioral results.

== Reasons for Implementation ==
The rationale of response to intervention is to provide all students the additional time and support necessary to learn and perform at high levels. The RTI process within MTSS can help to identify students who are at-risk, inform any adjustments needed to the instruction, monitor students' progress, and inform other necessary interventions.

There are at least four main reasons for implementing RTI to address the academic needs of students:

1. To increase achievement for all students
2. To reduce racial and ethnic disproportionate representation of minority students in special education
3. To increase collaboration and integration of general and special education
4. To identify students with learning disabilities through a different lens than the IQ-achievement discrepancy model

A study which evaluated the effects of supplemental reading interventions within MTSS and RTI initiatives found that when Tier 2 interventions are implemented with high levels of fidelity, consistency, and intensity, it is possible for students' reading outcomes to improve. The study reinforced existing research on the effectiveness of Tier 2 intervention in improving student reading performance in schools with low reading achievements levels across varying school districts. Some specific ways students improve in RTI programs improve include the development self-concepts of themselves as readers and improved reading fluency skills. Reading improvements from RTI interventions have been found in students from different socioeconomic, racial, and intellectual quotient groups.

When MTSS is implemented with fidelity, schools can comprehensively support the academic performance of students by providing social-emotional and behavioral supports to address non-academic issues that impact their learning. The MTSS framework is also very useful when working with students who have severe emotional struggles. The intervention and evaluation process for RTI encompassed by MTSS can help this particular group of students to be successful in the academic environment.

== Fidelity of Implementation ==
For an RTI/MTSS model to be effective, the assessments and interventions must be delivered with fidelity.

Factors that can reduce fidelity include:

- The complexity of the interventions and the time required to implement them
- Inaccessibility of required materials and resources
- Low perceptions or expectations surrounding the effectiveness of a particular intervention
- Low numbers, levels of expertise, or motivation among those who will be delivering the interventions

Factors that can increase fidelity include:

- Developing well-functioning professional learning communities
- Using a universal screener that is brief, aligned with the curriculum, yields reliable data, and is validated for screening decisions
- Utilizing a data-management system that is easily accessible by classroom teachers
- Implementing interventions that address the skill deficits of students
- Identifying and addressing class-wide needs
- Establishing well-defined decision rules
- Providing clear leadership from administration
- Incorporating consistent training and professional development opportunities
- Maintaining strong collaboration among key stakeholders in a flexible manner to improve student learning
- Using a standard-protocol for determining and implementing Tier 2 interventions
- Refraining from making entitlement (i.e., special education disability identification) decisions until the RTI system is well-established

By systematically integrating RTI/MTSS, schools are able to ensure that interventions are being provided appropriately to students within each of the three levels of support. When MTSS practices are implemented with consistency, studies have found evidence of positive academic and behavioral outcomes among students. Schools that incorporate components of MTSS following a clear set of procedures are equipped to appropriately address a variety of students' behavioral, social-emotional, and academic needs.

For schools to achieve success in their execution of MTSS, it is critical that there be a balance between the implementation fidelity and the customization of the systems and supports that are developed to meet the needs of students. When designing MTSS models, schools should follow a series of problem-solving and data-informed decision making to ensure their MTSS are sufficient for meeting the intended student achievement outcomes. Utilizing a critical and systematic approach toward the adoption of an MTSS approach can help schools determine the specific interventions necessary to meet a range of students' academic, social-emotional, and behavioral needs, and ensure its successful implementation.

== Challenges Influencing Implementation Fidelity ==
Certain barriers exist in schools which can affect their ability to achieve adequate implementation fidelity of an RTI/MTSS framework. Although many schools may recognize the need to administer Tier 2 or 3 assessments and instruction, they should fully consider the complex systems and ample supports that are required to deliver sustained MTSS practices. The successful integration of MTSS initiatives in schools may impact existing programs as schedules and staffing must accommodate small group and individualized Tier 2 and 3 supports. Adding additional supports for students requires appropriate assessments, qualified staff, and instructional resources. Unless schools recognize and plan for the different structures and supports needed to provide individualized interventions for students, they will be unlikely to effectively implement RTI or MTSS.

Another challenge is the variation that can occur between schools' models of RTI or MTSS. Variability exists among schools' definitions of what qualifies as "intensive" instruction and interventions. Definitions of who needs intervention can be swayed by the varying data that is collected by the different assessments used to evaluate students.

== See also ==
- School Psychology
- Minimally invasive education
- Positive education
- Positive Behavior Interventions and Supports
