= Positive behavior interventions and supports =

Form of behavior management in schools

Positive behavior interventions and supports (PBIS) is a set of ideas and tools used in schools to improve students' behavior. PBIS uses evidence and data-based programs, practices, and strategies to frame behavioral improvement relating to student growth in academic performance, safety, behavior, and establishing and maintaining positive school culture. PBIS tries to address the behavioral needs of at-risk students and the multi-leveled needs of all students, in an effort to create an environment that promotes effective teaching and learning in schools. Educational researchers such as Robert H. Horner believe that PBIS enhances the school staff's time for delivering effective instructions and lessons to all students.

In contrast to PBIS, many schools used exclusionary discipline practices including detentions, suspensions, or expulsions to separate students from the classroom and from peers. PBIS emphasizes preventing problem behaviors before they happen to increase the opportunity for students to learn by keeping them in the classroom. PBIS is a team-based framework for schools that borrows elements from response to intervention, an intervention that uses diagnostic data to develop personalized learning and behavior intervention plans (BiP) for all students.

== Background ==
PBIS (PBSIS) is an acronym for positive behavioral intervention and supports. PBIS emphasizes the integrated use of classroom management and school-wide discipline strategies coupled with effective academic instruction to create a positive and safe school climate for all students. PBIS is based in a behaviorist psychology approach to improving student behavior, which means that teachers and students identify misbehavior, model appropriate behaviors, and provide clear consequences for behavior in the classroom context. In a PBIS model, schools must define, teach, and reinforce appropriate behaviors to ensure success. PBIS follows research showing that punishing students inconsistently without a positive alternative, is ineffective and only offers short-term solutions. Modeling and rewarding positive behaviors are more effective. The goal of PBIS is to establish a positive school climate. To do this, a continuum of behavior support has been established which can be applied at the school level (primary level), for small groups of students (secondary level), and for individual level (tertiary level). When PBIS is applied to the entire school, it is called schoolwide PBIS, or SWPBIS. One must also consider the fact that PBIS can only work successfully if it is done with fidelity.

== Core features ==
PBIS is a framework approach that helps schools to identify the key tasks in developing preventative positive behavior tailored to their own school. The approach is defined by the following core design components. High fidelity implementation of school-wide PBIS has been linked with improvements in student and staff behavior, but less is known about which aspects of the model may be present in schools prior to training, and whether some features of PBIS are implemented faster than others.

=== Outcomes ===
PBIS is designed to enhance academic and social behavior outcomes for all students by (a) emphasizing the use of data for informing decisions about the selection, implementation, and progress monitoring of evidence-based behavioral practices; and (b) organizing resources and systems to improve durable implementation fidelity. The intended outcome is the goal for improved student behavior towards which the school community aims. The goals must be measurable, and must clearly be the result of implementing the PBIS model. Outcomes of a successful PBIS framework with a school can be measured in both behavior data and academic achievement of the students in the school. The academic and behavior goals are often defined and supported by the students, families, and teachers in tandem for the program to succeed.

=== Data ===
PBIS is grounded in the data being used for all levels of decision making. The team often considers trends in numbers, locations of where problems occurred, which classes they occurred in, and individual students that were involved. Through the data, usually collected by staff or preferably a licensed Board Certified Behavioral Analyst (BCBA), schools take stock of their current situation, pinpoint areas for change and or improvement, and evaluate the effects of current and future interventions.

=== Practices ===
This component refers to the evidence-based curriculum, instruction, interventions, and strategies implemented within the school, and are meant to create a common and shared understanding of expectations. These practices are introduced through the team after a review of the data.

=== Systems ===
PBIS requires a review team of educators with buy-in from across the school and strong administrative support to design and enforce the PBIS system. The team is generally a representative group of all of the staff (classroom teachers, special education teachers, specialists, etc.). In a secondary school, students could also be included as part of this team. The team creates the systems used by the remainder of the staff and the students they serve.

== Continuum of support ==
Each PBIS model uses a continuum of support. Tiers of support that range in intensity are offered to students as their needs fluctuate. Most students are supported by tier 1 (universal) level of support, which describes the general school context. As students struggle with the behavioral expectations of the model, they may advance to higher tiers to provide more support.

=== Tier 1: Primary level (support for all) ===
The first level in PBIS is the universal level. In terms of PBIS, this refers to the school-wide expectations that are defined and taught to all school staff in each of the settings within the school. These expectations are developed by the team and taught to students by their regular classroom teachers, administrators, counselors, psychologists, behavior specialists or others who have contact with all students. Many schools who have adopted this framework use "Be Safe, Be Respectful, Be Responsible," but like all aspects, this is determined by the school. The fidelity of the expectations should be determined by the continuous collecting of data. Along with the expectations, there should be a system of acknowledgement and reinforcement of expected behaviors.

The core principles of PBIS at the primary level are:

1. schools can effectively teach appropriate behavior to all students
2. intervene early
3. use a multi-tier model
4. use research-based interventions
5. monitor student progress often
6. use data to make decisions
7. use assessments to screen, diagnose, and monitor progress

These principles make the PBIS program significant in that it makes it more proactive rather than reactive. Furthermore, PBIS helps schools develop a common language, common practices, and consistent application of positive and negative reinforcement at a school-wide level.

=== Tier 2: Secondary level (support for some) ===
Although the primary level is taught and reinforced with all students, there may be some students who need additional intervention for students with at-risk behaviors as determined by the data. Secondary prevention provides intensive or targeted interventions to support students not responding to the primary efforts. These behavioral interventions are taught by specialized staff like special educators, school psychologists, behavior interventionists, and counselors. Some examples of tier 2 behavior interventions are targeted social skill groups, behavior plans with continuous progress monitoring.

=== Tier 3: Tertiary level (support for few) ===
PBIS also acknowledges that some students have high risk behaviors and need specialized, or individualized skill building practice due to exhibited habits of problem behavior. Tier 3 behavioral interventions involve a functional behavioral assessment (FBA) and an individualized plan of support which includes:

1. new skills to replace problem behaviors
2. reorganization of current environment or "triggers"
3. procedures for monitoring, evaluating, and reassessing the plan.

To succeed in a tier 3 intervention, both tier 1 and tier 2 interventions must also be in place. Also, support must be conducted in a comprehensive and collaborative manner.

The Tier 3 process should include the student with the behavior issue and the people who know them the best on a personal level working together as a behavioral support team (BST). The BST should consist of teachers, administrators, school social workers, psychologists, counselors and/or a licensed behavior specialist. Support should be tailored to the student’s specific needs and student interests should be taken into consideration. It should also include multiple interventions. The goal at this level is to diminish problematic behavior, increase adaptive skills, and attempt to increase the student's quality of life.

== Alternatives ==
=== Culturally responsive PBIS ===
Culturally responsive PBIS (CR-PBIS) is also a framework aimed at restructuring school culture much like PBIS, but CR-PBIS uses strategies that acknowledge the differences in behavioral norms for culturally and linguistically diverse students and incorporate trauma-informed practices. The aims of CR-PBIS is to merge strategies deployed in culturally relevant teaching with PBIS, often to explicitly reduce disproportional exclusionary discipline rates for African American children. The behavior of students with color, without the knowledge of the community they come from, may be seen as disruptive, resistant, and limiting to student success. CR-PBIS tries to address these concerns that are left untouched by the traditional PBIS framework by including families and the outside community as a large piece of creating an environment for teaching and learning.

=== Responsive classroom ===
Just like PBIS, responsive classroom (RC) centers on research-based approaches and strive to ensure high quality education to all students. Both agree that these positive behaviors and the skills needed to reach them must be explicitly taught to students using Social Skills taught in class. Lastly, both also believe that non-punitive strategies are more effective than what has been used in schools in the past.

Where PBIS is a framework that coaches the school staff to create their own resources and changes, Responsive Classroom outlines specific prescribed practices that schools should use to reach this goal. Responsive classroom is a for-purchase-program that staff can be trained in at multiple levels and has published tools and strategies for meeting these goals with students.

== See also ==
- Positive behavior support (PBS)
- Licensed behavior analyst (BCBA)
- Behavior modification
- Emotional learning

== Notes and references ==
- Bal, A., Thorius, K.K., & Kozleski, E. (2012). "Culturally responsive positive behavioral support matters". Equity Alliance. Retrieved March 9, 2015.
- U.S. Office of Special Education Programs. (2015). Positive Behavioral Interventions and Supports. Retrieved from: https://www.pbis.org/
