= List of autism-related publications =

This is a list of autism-related publications, including non-fiction books about autism, memoirs and personal accounts, fiction featuring autistic characters. The publications address subjects including autistic people's experiences, the history of autism, neurodiversity, education and support.

== Fiction ==
=== Adult fiction ===
- The Bride Test (2019), by Helen Hoang, is a romance novel featuring Khai Diep, an autistic Vietnamese-American man whose mother arranges for a woman from Vietnam to meet him as a prospective partner.
- The Curious Incident of the Dog in the Night-Time (2003), by Mark Haddon, is a mystery novel narrated by Christopher Boone, who investigates the death of a neighbour's dog. Publisher descriptions identify Christopher as autistic; Haddon has stated that neither autism nor Asperger syndrome is named in the novel.
- House Rules (2010), by Jodi Picoult, concerns an autistic teenager accused of murder and the interpretation of his behaviour by the criminal justice system.
- The Kiss Quotient (2018), by Helen Hoang, is a romance novel about Stella Lane, an autistic econometrician who hires an escort to help her become more comfortable with sexual intimacy and relationships.
- Miracle Creek (2019), by Angie Kim, is a courtroom thriller involving a fire at a hyperbaric oxygen therapy facility whose patients include autistic children.
- La Surface de réparation (2015), by Alain Gillot, follows a football coach who becomes responsible for his thirteen-year-old nephew, who has Asperger syndrome.

=== Children's fiction ===
- Can You See Me? (2019), by Libby Scott and Rebecca Westcott, follows Tally, an autistic girl navigating school and friendships. It includes diary entries based on Scott's experiences of autism.
- A Kind of Spark (2020), by Elle McNicoll, follows Addie, an autistic girl who campaigns for a memorial to women accused of witchcraft in her Scottish village.
- Oh, Tal! Not Today (2024), by Tal Anderson, illustrated by Michael Richey White, is a picture book about a girl whose actions are misunderstood by her parents. Its creators drew on their experiences of autism in developing the series. It was followed by Oh, Tal! Not Like That (2026).
- Rules (2006), by Cynthia Lord, follows twelve-year-old Catherine, whose younger brother David is autistic, as she navigates family relationships and friendships.

== Memoirs and personal accounts ==
- Autism in Heels: The Untold Story of a Female Life on the Spectrum (2018), by Jennifer Cook O'Toole. An autobiographical account of autistic experience from a woman's perspective.
- The Autistic Brothers: Two Unconventional Paths to Adulthood (2018), by Thomas Clements, illustrated by Jack Clements. A memoir about the author's relationship with his autistic brother, whose support needs differ from his own.
- The Autistic Buddha: My Unconventional Path to Enlightenment (2017), by Thomas Clements. A memoir about his travels and autistic experience.
- The Autists: Women on the Spectrum (2023), by Clara Törnvall, translated by Alice E. Olsson. An account combining the author's experiences with an exploration of autistic women in culture and society.
- A Child Called Noah: A Family Journey (1972), by Josh Greenfeld. A parent's account of family life with his autistic son.
- The Journal of Best Practices (2012), by David Finch. A memoir about his marriage to his non-autistic wife.
- A Little Less Broken: How an Autism Diagnosis Finally Made Me Whole (2024), by Marian Schembari. A memoir about her experiences as an autistic woman diagnosed in adulthood.
- Louder Than Words: A Mother's Journey in Healing Autism (2007), by Jenny McCarthy. A parent's account of her son's autism.
- The Loudest Girl in the World (2022), hosted by Lauren Ober. An autobiographical podcast about her autism diagnosis in adulthood.
- Nobody Nowhere: The Extraordinary Autobiography of an Autistic Girl (1992), by Donna Williams. An autobiographical account of growing up autistic.
- Our Autistic Lives: Personal Accounts from Autistic Adults Around the World Aged 20 to 70+ (2020), edited by Alex Ratcliffe. A collection of first-person accounts from autistic adults.
- An Outsider's Guide to Humans (2020), by Camilla Pang. A personal account combining scientific explanations with her experiences as an autistic woman.
- Plums for Months (2023), by Zaji Cox. A memoir reflecting on childhood as an autistic girl in a low-income household.
- Population One: Autism, Adversity, and the Will to Succeed (2013), by Tyler McNamer. A personal account of his experiences as an autistic person.
- Pretending to Be Normal: Living with Asperger's Syndrome (1999), by Liane Holliday Willey. An autobiographical account of life with Asperger syndrome.
- The Siege: The First Eight Years of an Autistic Child (1967), by Clara Claiborne Park. A parent's account of her daughter's childhood.
- Son-Rise (1976), by Barry Neil Kaufman. A parent's account of the Son-Rise programme and claims about its effects on his son.
- Son-Rise: The Miracle Continues (1994), by Barry Neil Kaufman. An expanded account of the Son-Rise programme.
- The Sound of a Miracle (1991), by Annabel Stehli. A parent's account of her autistic daughter's experience of auditory integration training.
- Strong Female Character (2023), by Fern Brady. An autobiography discussing her life and autistic experience.
- Ten Steps to Nanette (2022), by Hannah Gadsby. A memoir discussing their life, including their autism and ADHD diagnoses in adulthood.
- Thinking in Pictures: My Life with Autism (1995), by Temple Grandin. An autobiographical account of visual thinking and autistic experience.
- We're Not Broken: Changing the Autism Conversation (2021), by Eric Garcia. A nonfiction account drawing on interviews with autistic people across the United States to examine autistic experiences and challenge stereotypes.
- What I Mean When I Say I'm Autistic: Unpuzzling a Life on the Autism Spectrum (2022), by Annie Kotowicz. An autobiographical account of autistic experience.

== Magazines and journals ==
=== Research journals ===
Education and Training of the Mentally Retarded began publication in 1966. It was renamed Education and Training in Autism and Developmental Disabilities in 2010.

The first scientific journal devoted specifically to autism, the Journal of Autism and Childhood Schizophrenia, was established in 1971. Its first editor was Austrian-American child psychiatrist Leo Kanner. In 1979, it became the Journal of Autism and Developmental Disorders.

Autism began publication in 1997 through a partnership between publisher Sage and the National Autistic Society, a British autism charity. Publisher Elsevier launched Research in Autism Spectrum Disorders in 2007.

The International Society for Autism Research, a scientific organisation, launched its journal Autism Research in 2008. Publisher BioMed Central launched Molecular Autism in 2010, with its articles freely available online.

The Review Journal of Autism and Developmental Disorders began publication in 2014. Advances in Autism followed in 2015, and Autism & Developmental Language Impairments in 2016.

Autism in Adulthood began publication in 2019, focusing on research and issues affecting autistic adults.

=== Magazines and news publications ===
American social worker Ira Minot and his son, musician David Minot, founded Autism Spectrum News in 2008. It began as a quarterly print publication and moved entirely online in 2021.

British magazine editors Gillian Loughran and Mark Hayes, parents of an autistic child, established Autism Eye in 2011. British database administrator Mark Blakey founded Autism Parenting Magazine the following year.

The first edition of Revista Autismo (Autism Magazine) was published in Brazil in September 2010.

== Guides ==
=== For children and teenagers ===
- The Asperkid's (Secret) Book of Social Rules: The Handbook of Not-So-Obvious Social Guidelines for Tweens and Teens with Asperger Syndrome (2012), by Jennifer Cook O'Toole, is a guide for autistic young people covering friendship, conversation and unwritten social expectations.
- Freaks, Geeks and Asperger Syndrome: A User Guide to Adolescence (2002), by Luke Jackson, combines personal experiences with advice for young people with Asperger syndrome. Jackson wrote the book at thirteen, discussing subjects including school, bullying, friendship and dating.
- The Survival Guide for Kids with Autism Spectrum Disorders (and Their Parents) (2012), by Elizabeth Verdick and Elizabeth Reeve, explains autism to young readers and offers advice on communication, friendships, emotions and everyday activities. An updated edition, titled The Survival Guide for Kids with Autism Spectrum Disorder (and Their Parents), was published in 2021.

=== For autistic adults ===
- Aspergirls: Empowering Females with Asperger Syndrome (2010), by Rudy Simone, is a guide for autistic girls and women covering education, employment, relationships and everyday life.
- Divergent Mind: Thriving in a World That Wasn't Designed for You (2020), by Jenara Nerenberg, explores the experiences of neurodivergent women, including those with autism, attention deficit hyperactivity disorder, synaesthesia and sensory processing disorder. It discusses recognition of these differences and changes to communication and surroundings to accommodate them.
- Unmasking Autism: Discovering the New Faces of Neurodiversity (2022), by Devon Price, examines autistic masking, in which people conceal or suppress autistic traits to meet social expectations. It combines research, personal accounts and exercises exploring identity and self-acceptance.

=== For parents of autistic children ===
- An Early Start for Your Child with Autism: Using Everyday Activities to Help Kids Connect, Communicate, and Learn (2012), by Sally J. Rogers, Geraldine Dawson and Laurie A. Vismara, describes ways for parents to support communication, play and learning through everyday activities. It draws on the Early Start Denver Model.
- Asperger Syndrome and Your Child: A Parent's Guide (2002), by Michael D. Powers and Janet Poland, discusses Asperger syndrome and offers advice to parents on understanding and supporting their children.
- Asperger's Syndrome: A Guide for Parents and Professionals (1997), by Tony Attwood, discusses the identification of Asperger syndrome and support for children and adults, including communication, social relationships and everyday activities.
- The Autistic Spectrum: A Guide for Parents and Professionals (1996), by Lorna Wing, explains the autism spectrum and discusses support and services for autistic people.
- Children with Autism: A Parents' Guide (1989), edited by Michael D. Powers, provides information for families of autistic children.
- A Parent's Guide to Asperger Syndrome and High-Functioning Autism: How to Meet the Challenges and Help Your Child Thrive (2002), by Sally Ozonoff, Geraldine Dawson and James C. McPartland, provides information and advice for parents on diagnosis and supporting their children at home and school.
- Positive Parenting for Autism: Powerful Strategies to Help Your Child Overcome Challenges and Thrive (2018), by Victoria Boone, presents parenting strategies based on applied behaviour analysis (ABA).
- Ten Things Every Child with Autism Wishes You Knew (2005), by Ellen Notbohm, discusses autistic children's communication, sensory experiences and support needs for an audience of parents and other adults.
- Turn Autism Around: An Action Guide for Parents of Young Children with Early Signs of Autism (2021), by Mary Lynch Barbera, describes an approach based on applied behaviour analysis for parents of young children. Topics include communication, eating, sleep and toilet training.
- Uniquely Human: A Different Way of Seeing Autism (2015), by Barry M. Prizant with Tom Fields-Meyer, discusses understanding autistic people's behaviour and experiences, with an emphasis on relationships and support.
- The Verbal Behavior Approach: How to Teach Children with Autism and Related Disorders (2007), by Mary Lynch Barbera with Tracy Rasmussen, is a guide for parents and professionals to teaching communication and other skills using applied behaviour analysis and B. F. Skinner's analysis of verbal behaviour.

== Education and support ==
- Connecting with the Autism Spectrum: How to Talk, How to Listen, and Why You Shouldn't Call It High-Functioning (2020), by Casey Vormer, offers guidance on communicating with autistic adults.
- Educating and Understanding Autistic Children (1982), edited by Robert L. Koegel, Arnold Rincover and Andrew L. Egel, addresses the education of autistic children.
- Educating Children with Autism (2001), published by the US National Research Council and edited by Catherine Lord and James P. McGee, examines educational interventions for young autistic children.
- Social Skills Training for Children and Adolescents with Asperger Syndrome and Social-Communication Problems (2003), by Jed Baker, describes methods for assessing and teaching social skills and supporting their use in everyday situations.
- Teaching Language to Children with Autism or Other Developmental Disabilities (1998), by Mark L. Sundberg and James W. Partington, applies B. F. Skinner's analysis of verbal behaviour to teaching language.

== History of autism ==
- A History of Autism: Conversations with the Pioneers (2010), by British autism researcher Adam Feinstein. The book was commissioned by Autistica founder Stephanie Shirley.
- Asperger's Children: The Origins of Autism in Nazi Vienna (2018), by American historian Edith Sheffer.
- Autism: A Social and Medical History (2013), by autism researcher Mitzi Waltz. A second edition was published in 2023.
- Histoire de l'autisme : de l'enfant sauvage aux troubles envahissants du développement (2009), by French psychoanalyst and psychiatrist Jacques Hochmann.
- In a Different Key: The Story of Autism (2016), by American journalists John Donvan and Caren Zucker. The book was a finalist for a 2017 Pulitzer Prize.
- NeuroTribes: The Legacy of Autism and the Future of Neurodiversity (2015), by American writer Steve Silberman. The book explains the history of autism and the concept of neurodiversity.
- The Metamorphosis of Autism: A History of Child Development in Britain (2017), by British health historian Bonnie Evans.
- Understanding Autism: Parents, Doctors, and the History of a Disorder (2011), by American science historian Chloe Silverman.
