= Geraldine Dawson =

American psychologist

- Awards: James McKeen Cattell Lifetime Achievement Award (2012)

Academic background
- Education: University of Washington
- Thesis: Early Infantile Autism and Hemispheric Specialization

Academic work
- Discipline: Developmental psychology
- Institutions: University of Washington (1985–2008); University of North Carolina at Chapel Hill (2008–2013); Autism Speaks; Duke University
- Main interests: Autism
- Website: https://psychiatry.duke.edu/profile/geraldine-dawson

Geraldine Dawson is an American child psychologist, specializing in autism. Her research has focused on early detection, brain development, and early intervention. Dawson is William Cleland Distinguished Professor of Psychiatry and Behavioral Sciences and professor of psychology and neuroscience, former director, Duke Institute for Brain Sciences and founding director of the Duke Center for Autism and Brain Development at Duke University Medical Center. Dawson was president of the International Society for Autism Research, a scientific and professional organization devoted to advancing knowledge about autism. From 2008 to 2013, Dawson was research professor of psychiatry at the University of North Carolina at Chapel Hill and was chief science officer for Autism Speaks. Dawson also held the position of adjunct professor of psychiatry at Columbia University and is professor emerita of psychology at University of Washington. She is a member of the American Academy of Arts and Sciences and a fellow of the American Psychological Society, American Psychological Association, International Society for Autism Research, and the Society of Clinical Child and Adolescent Psychology.

== Education ==
Dawson received a Bachelor of Science degree in psychology from the University of Washington in 1974 and her Ph.D. in developmental psychology with a minor in child clinical psychology from the University of Washington in 1979. In 1980, she was a postdoctoral fellow and clinical intern at the UCLA Neuropsychiatric Institute, where she specialized in neurodevelopmental disorders. She became a licensed practicing child psychologist in 1980.

== Career ==
Dawson has had a career as a scientist and practicing psychologist focusing on autism and the effects of early experience on the developing brain.

Dawson is currently William Cleland Distinguished Professor of Psychiatry and the founding director of the Duke Center for Autism and Brain Development. She directs an NIH Autism Center of Excellence research program at Duke. She formerly directed the Duke Institute for Brain Sciences. Early in her career, Dawson was an assistant professor of child clinical psychology at the University of North Carolina at Chapel Hill and affiliate of the Treatment and Education of Autistic and Related Communication Handicapped Children program from 1980 to 1985. In 1985, she returned to her alma mater to join the psychology department faculty, where she directed the University of Washington Child Clinical Psychology Program (1985–1991; 1999–2004). From 1996–2008, Dawson was founding director of the University of Washington Autism Center, which worked with Microsoft Corporation to set a precedent for companies to provide insurance coverage for autism early intervention. At the UW Autism Center, she directed an NIH-funded autism research program focusing on genetics, neuroimaging, early diagnosis, and early intervention. Dawson also founded and oversaw a treatment center for autistic children and adolescents at the UW Autism Center, which provided multi-disciplinary clinical services for autistic children from infancy through late adolescence. Dawson has served as associate editor or editorial board member for seven scientific journals: Clinical Psychological Science, Journal of Autism and Developmental Disorders, Development and Psychopathology, Psychophysiology, Autism Research, Autism Research and Treatment, and the Journal of Neurodevelopmental Disorders.

Dawson's research has focused on early detection and intervention, brain function (using electrophysiology and functional magnetic resonance imaging), and genetic studies in autism. Her early work demonstrated that maternal depression is associated with differences in early brain activity and stress responses of infants and children. Her lab also demonstrated that autism signs can be detected in infants and described differences in early brain functioning related to autism. Dawson's lab at the University of Washington described differences in social brain circuitry related to face processing in autism, apparent as early as six months of age. In collaboration with Dr. Sally J. Rogers, Dawson developed and empirically validated the Early Start Denver Model, a comprehensive early intervention program for autistic toddlers and preschoolers. With Guillermo Sapiro, she developed a novel method for early detection of autism based on computer vision and machine learning.

=== Autism Speaks ===
Dawson was on faculty at the University of Washington from 1980 to 2008 when she left to become Autism Speaks' first chief science officer. At Autism Speaks, Dawson oversaw $20–30 million in annual research funding, including funding for the Autism Treatment Network, the Autism Genetic Resource Exchange, the Autism Genome Project, and the Autism Tissue Program.

== Media and popular press coverage ==
Dawson's work has been featured in the media, including programs such as the Jim Lehrer NewsHour, PBS Scientific American Frontiers with Alan Alda, The New York Times, among many others. Her research demonstrating that early intervention is associated with changes in brain activity in autistic children was recognized by Time magazine as one of the top 10 medical breakthroughs of 2012. The Early Start Denver Model is described in the January 2014 issue of Scientific American Mind.

Dawson has testified before the United States Senate to advocate for autistic individuals and their families: in 1999 in support of the Children's Health Act of 2000, in 2002 on behalf of the Federation of Behavioral, Psychological, and Cognitive Sciences, in 2009 at the request of the Senate to provide an update on the current state of autism science, and in 2012 in support of a bill to increase access to autism services for military families.
