= Tager =

Tager is a Norman French surname. Notable people with the surname include:

- Aron Tager (1934–2019), American-Canadian actor, poet, artist, and sculptor
- Helen Tager-Flusberg, English-American psychologist
- Osias Tager (1914–2005), British businessman

== See also ==
- Alisa Tager (Cipher), a mutant character in Marvel Comics
- Sager
