= Eric Schopler =

American autism researcher (1927–2006)

- Born: February 8, 1927; Fürth, Germany
- Died: July 7, 2006 (aged 79) near Mebane, North Carolina
- Education: University of Chicago
- Occupations: Professor, psychologist, researcher, author
- Known for: Founder of TEACCH, autism researcher, professor and author
- Notable work: Research and books on autism, Asperger syndrome, developmental disorders, TEACCH

Eric Schopler (February 8, 1927 – July 7, 2006) was a German-born American psychologist whose research into autism led to the foundation of the Treatment and Education of Autistic and Related Communication Handicapped Children (TEACCH) program.

== Personal life ==
Eric Schopler was born February 8, 1927, in Fürth, Germany to Erna Oppenheimer Schopler and Ernst Schopler, who were Jewish. In 1938 his family fled Nazi Germany and emigrated to the U.S., where they settled in Rochester, New York.

Schopler married Betsy Burch in 1953 and together they had three children: Bobby, Tom and Susie. Following his divorce in 1970, he married Margaret Lansing. He died at the age of 79 from cancer on July 7, 2006, at his home near Mebane, North Carolina.

== Military service and education ==
After graduating from high school, Schopler joined the United States Army. In 1949 Schopler earned his bachelor's degree from the University of Chicago. In 1955, he attained a graduate degree in Social Service Administration. He earned a PhD in clinical child psychology in 1964. All three degrees were attained at the University of Chicago.

== Career ==
=== Early career ===
After attaining his graduate degree, Schopler worked from 1955 to 1958 as a family counselor in Rochester, New York. He moved to Rhode Island, where he worked for two years at the Emma P. Bradley Hospital as its acting chief psychiatric social worker. In 1960, he worked in Chicago at the Treatment and Research Center for Childhood Schizophrenia. He was an investigator and therapist there until 1964, the same year that he attained his doctorate from University of Chicago.

=== University of North Carolina ===
In 1964, Schopler was hired as an associate professor by the University of North Carolina at Chapel Hill's (UNC's) psychiatry department. He became the director of its Child Research Project in 1966. In collaboration with Dr. Robert Reichler, he applied his earlier research on receptor processes to the treatment of autism. Funding was provided by the National Institute of Mental Health and trials were conducted with autistic children and their parents.

As a result of Schopler's work for the Child Research Project, TEACCH was created at UNC in 1971, and he was made co-director of the program in 1972. TEACCH is an autism-focused education, research and clinical-services program that has led to an enhanced understanding of autistic individuals. Schopler showed that most autistic children did not have mental disorders, as was believed by many at the time. He also proved that parents of autistic children could be effective collaborators in the treatment and education of their children. Thanks to these TEACCH results, in 1972, Schopler's methods were rolled out statewide in North Carolina schools and special state-funded clinics.

In 1973, Schopler was made a full professor at UNC. In 1976, he became the primary director of TEACCH and remained so until 1993. He became the associate chair for developmental disabilities at the university's psychiatry department in 1992, a title he held until 1996. Schopler also served as the department's chief psychologist from 1987 to 1999. He worked on UNC's TEACCH program until 2005.

The TEACCH methodology has been implemented internationally and, as of 2006, in North Carolina, there were nine TEACCH state-funded clinics in operation.

In 1989, Schopler and two of his UNC colleagues (Andrew Short and Gary Mesibov) co-authored a paper criticizing the 1987 study of autistic children overseen by UCLA psychology professor Ole Ivar Lovaas. In the 1987 study, Lovaas claimed that nearly half the test subjects he assigned to receive intensive, longterm applied behavior analysis had fully "recovered" from autism and co-occurring intellectual disability. Schopler, Short and Mesibov claimed Lovaas' study was compromised by flawed outcome measures, subject selection bias and inadequate controls. They stated, "Based on these issues, the most conservative conclusion to be drawn is that it is not possible to determine the effects of this intervention."

=== Other professional activities ===
Schopler was editor for Journal of Autism and Developmental Disorders from 1974 until 1997, when he was succeeded by Mesibov. He was also on the Schizophrenia Bulletin and the Topics in Early Childhood Special Education editorial boards.

Schopler was a member of the Society for Research in Child Development, American Association on Mental Deficiency, and American Association for the Advancement of Science. He also served on the advisory boards of the Autism Society of America, the Autism Society of North Carolina, the Linwood Children's Center (Ellicott City, Maryland) and Bitter Sweet Farms (Toledo, Ohio).

=== Recognition ===
He received the following recognition for his work:

- 1972 - American Psychiatric Association's Gold Achievement Award for Child Research Project
- 1985 - University of North Carolina at Chapel Hill's O. Max Gardner Award for contributions to human welfare
- 1993 - North Carolina Award for public service
- 1997 - American Psychological Association's Award for Distinguished Contributions to the Advancement of Knowledge and Service
- 2005 - Autism Society of North Carolina's Lifetime Achievement Award
- 2006 - American Psychological Foundation's gold medal for Life Achievement in the Application of Psychology
- 2007 - North Carolina General Assembly Resolution 2007-17 (honoring Schopler's life and memory)

Schopler has spent his life working to determine the precise nature of autism and the most effective ways to treat it. His doctoral research on the sensory preferences of children with autism was among the first experimental studies that helped redefine the condition as a developmental disability, rather than a psychogenic condition caused by poor parenting. His subsequent research into educational treatments for autism, and his use of the parents of autistic children as co-therapists in this treatment, met with resounding success, leading to the formation of TEACCH in 1971 and the program's receipt of the American Psychiatric Association's Gold Achievement Award in 1972.

— University of North Carolina Health Care

=== Publications ===
More than 200 articles and books related to autism were written by Schopler. Below is a partial list of some of the works he edited or co-authored.

- Eric Schopler; Robert J. Reichler. (editors). Psychopathology and Child Development: Research and Treatment. New York: Plenum Press, 1976. ISBN 0306308703
- Michael Rutter; Eric Schopler. (editors). Autism: A reappraisal of concepts and treatment. New York: Plenum Press, 1978. ISBN 0306310961.
- Eric Schopler; Gary B. Mesibov. Psychoeducational Profile - Revised (PEP-R). Pro-Ed; 1 January 1979. ISBN 978-0-89079-238-4.
- Eric Schopler; Robert J. Reichler; Margaret D. Lansing. Individualized Assessment and Treatment for Autistic and Developmentally Disabled Children. University Park Press, 1980.
- Eric Schopler; Robert Reichler; Margaret D. Lansing. Teaching Strategies for Parents and Professionals: Volume II. 1980.
- Eric Schopler; Margaret D. Lansing; Leslie Waters. Teaching Activities for Autistic Children: Volume III. Part of the series Individualized Assessment and Treatment for Autistic and Developmentally Disabled Children. University Park Press, 1982. ISBN 0839118007
- Eric Schopler; Gary B. Mesibov. Autism in Adolescents and Adults. Springer; 28 February 1983. ISBN 978-0-306-41057-4.
- Eric Schopler; Gary B. Mesibov. (editors) Communication Problems in Autism. Springer; 31 May 1985 ISBN 978-0-306-41859-4.
- Eric Schopler; Gary B. Mesibov. Social Behavior in Autism. Springer; 28 February 1986. ISBN 978-0-306-42163-1.
- Eric Schopler; Robert J. Reichler; Barbara Rochen Renner. The childhood autism rating scale (CARS) for diagnostic screening and classification of autism. New York: Irvington, 1986. ISBN 0829015884
- Eric Schopler; Gary B. Mesibov. Neurobiological Issues in Autism. Springer; 30 April 1987. ISBN 978-0-306-42451-9.
- Gary Mesibov; Eric Schopler. Adolescent and Adult Psychoeducational Profile (AAPEP). Pro-Ed; 1 September 1988. ISBN 978-0-89079-152-3.
- Eric Schopler; Gary B. Mesibov. Diagnosis and Assessment in Autism. Springer; 30 September 1988. ISBN 978-0-306-42889-0.
- Gary B. Mesibov; Eric Schopler; Bruce Schaffer; Rhonda Landrus. Adolescent and Adult Psychoeducational Profile (AAPEP): Volume IV (1988). Pro-ed, 1989. ISBN 089079152X.
- Linda R. Watson; Catherine Lord; Bruce Schaffer; Eric Schopler. Teaching Spontaneous Communication to Autistic and Developmentally Handicapped Children. 'New York: Irvington Publishers Inc., 1988. ISBN 0829018328'
- Eric Schopler; Mary Elizabeth Van Bourgondien; Marie M. Bristol. (editors). Preschool Issues in Autism. New York: Plenum Press, 1993. Part of the series Current Issues in Autism. ISBN 0306444402
- Eric Schopler; Gary B. Mesibov. Behavioral Issues in Autism. Springer; 31 March 1994 ISBN 978-0-306-44600-9.
- Eric Schopler; Gary B. Mesibov. Learning and cognition in autism. Plenum Press; 1995. ISBN 978-0-306-44871-3.
- Eric Schopler; Gary B. Mesibov. (editors). Parent Survival Manual: A Guide to Crisis Resolution in Autism and Related Developmental Disorders. Springer; 30 June 1995 ISBN 978-0-306-44977-2.
- Eric Schopler; Gary B. Mesibov; Linda J. Kunce. Asperger Syndrome or High-Functioning Autism?. Springer; 30 April 1998 ISBN 978-0-306-45746-3.
- Eric Schopler; Nurit Yimiya; Cory Shulman; Lee M. Marcus (editors). The Research Basis for Autism Intervention. Plenum Publishing, 2001. ISBN 030646585X
- Gary B. Mesibov; Victoria Shea; Eric Schopler. The TEACCH Approach to Autism Spectrum Disorders. Springer; 7 December 2004. ISBN 978-0-306-48646-3.
