= Council on Quality and Leadership =

Organization

The Council on Quality and Leadership is a U.S. organization which provides accreditation and training for agencies providing services for people with intellectual, psychiatric, and developmental disabilities. It was established in 1969.

CQL member organizations form the governing body by appointing representatives to serve on the board of directors. They include the American Association on Intellectual and Developmental Disabilities (AAIDD), American Network of Community Options and Resources (ANCOR), Autism Society of America, Mosaic, the National Association of QMRPs (NAQ), National Alliance for Direct Support Professionals (NADSP), Self Advocates Becoming Empowered (SABE), and The Arc. It has partnerships with organizations in Canada and the Republic of Ireland.
