= David Amaral =

Professor of psychiatry at the University of California, Davis

- Born: David Gil Amaral; New Bedford, Massachusetts, U.S.
- Education: Northwestern University; University of Rochester
- Scientific career
- Fields: Psychiatry
- Workplaces: University of California, Davis; Washington University School of Medicine
- Thesis: A Golgi Analysis of the Hilus Region of the Hippocampus: Cell Types and Postnatal Development (1977)
- Doctoral students: Wendy Suzuki
- Website: www.ucdmc.ucdavis.edu/mindinstitute/ourteam/faculty/amaral.html

David Gil Amaral is a professor of psychiatry at the University of California, Davis, United States, and since 1998 has been the research director at the M.I.N.D. Institute, an affiliate of UC Davis, engaged in interdisciplinary research into the causes and treatment of autism and related neurodevelopmental disorders. Amaral joined the UC Davis faculty as a professor in the Department of Psychiatry and the Center for Neuroscience and as an investigator at the California Regional Primate Research Center in 1991. Since 1995, he has been a professor of psychiatry in the UC Davis School of Medicine, with an appointment to the UC Davis Center for Neuroscience.

== Education ==
In 1972, Amaral earned his bachelor's degree in psychology from Northwestern University, and in 1977 his PhD in neurobiology and psychology at the University of Rochester. From 1977 to 1980, Amaral was a National Institutes of Health postdoctoral fellow with Dr. W. Maxwell Cowan at the Department of Anatomy & Neurobiology, Washington University School of Medicine.

== Research ==
Amaral studies the organization and functioning of the hippocampus, the amygdala and other parts of the primate and human brain. Amaral has directed several million dollars' worth of research with grants from the National Institute of Mental Health (NIMH), which has included primate research investigations on the function of the amygdala, a brain region associated with emotion processing. Amaral investigated "Postmortem Neuroanatomical Evaluation of the Amygdaloid Complex in Autism". His earlier studies detected alterations in the amygdala, which some have speculated underlies the social and emotional abnormalities in autism.

Amaral's awards include the McKnight Foundation Scholars Award, 1981, the Sloan Foundation Fellow, 1983, and the National Institute of Mental Health (NIMH) Merit Award, 1989 and 1993. He is the first holder of the Beneto Foundation Chair, an endowed position at UC Davis created by the Beneto Foundation of Sacramento. Amaral was the President of the International Society for Autism Research and since 2015 is the editor-in-chief of the society's journal Autism Research. In 2019, he was elected to the National Academy of Medicine.

== MIND Institute ==
Amaral was the founding Research Director of the MIND Institute. This institute was started at UC Davis in collaboration with the parents of children diagnosed with autism spectrum disorders. Amaral's research team is dedicated to understanding the biological and behavioral features of autism, with the goal of prevention and decreased disability. The partnership between the parents and Amaral's team of researchers secured $34 million in funding from the California legislature, primarily for research purposes. After raising additional funds and building a state-of-the-art facility in Sacramento, California, the institute has become one the premier autism research centers in the world. The MIND Institute studies all aspects of autism spectrum disorder. Amaral heads a unique longitudinal analysis of young children with autism call the Autism Phenome Project. Started in 2006, this project involves over 400 families as of 2015 and is determining unique features of brain development in children as young as two years of age.
