= Rick Rollens =

American lobbyist

Rick Rollens (born 1950) is an American lobbyist with a client list including ARCA (Association of Regional Center Agencies/California Department of Developmental Services), Autism Business Association, and Applied Behavior Consultants. He is also a political consultant and identifies as an internationally known advocate for autism research. His specific focus in terms of research and advocacy is for those "full syndrome" autistic individuals. Prior to his son Russell's autism diagnosis, Rollens was the secretary of the California State Senate. Rollens resides in Granite Bay, California where he runs a lobbying/consulting business.

Rollens assisted in raising over $70 million to fund research efforts aimed at finding the causes and treatments for autism spectrum disorders. Rollens was instrumental in the founding of Families for Early Autism Treatment (FEAT) and the University of California, Davis M.I.N.D. Institute (Medical Investigation of Neurodevelopmental Disorders). Rollens is also a former board member of the Autism Society of America.

== Education ==
Rollens graduated from California State University, Northridge.

== Political career ==
During a 23-year career working within the California State Legislature, Rollens served as a senator's chief of staff, as the chief consultant to the Senate Rules Committee, and as the director and creator of the state's Office of Senate Floor Analyses.

== Russell Rollens ==
Rollens suspects his son Russell's autism was vaccine injury induced, a view which is not supported by scientific evidence. After Russell's diagnosis in 1996, Rollens' life changed completely: his 23-year tenure with the Senate came to an end and he began to devote his working hours to the investigation of vaccine injuries and autism. Russell and his parents were featured in a Newsweek cover story on autism on July 31, 2000.

== M.I.N.D. Institute ==
Rollens is a co-founder of the M.I.N.D. Institute, founded in 1998. The center is a collaboration—between the parents of children with autism spectrum disorders and UC Davis researchers—who have united in a quest to find the causes of autism and treatment for neurodevelopmental disorders.

Rollens says just pouring money into traditional autism research would not get them very far, "If we were going to wait for mainstream medicine to get around to finding a cure for our kids, we would all be old and gray and our kids would outlive us in their condition."

== See also ==
- List of vaccine topics
