= Melissa Francis =

American news anchor

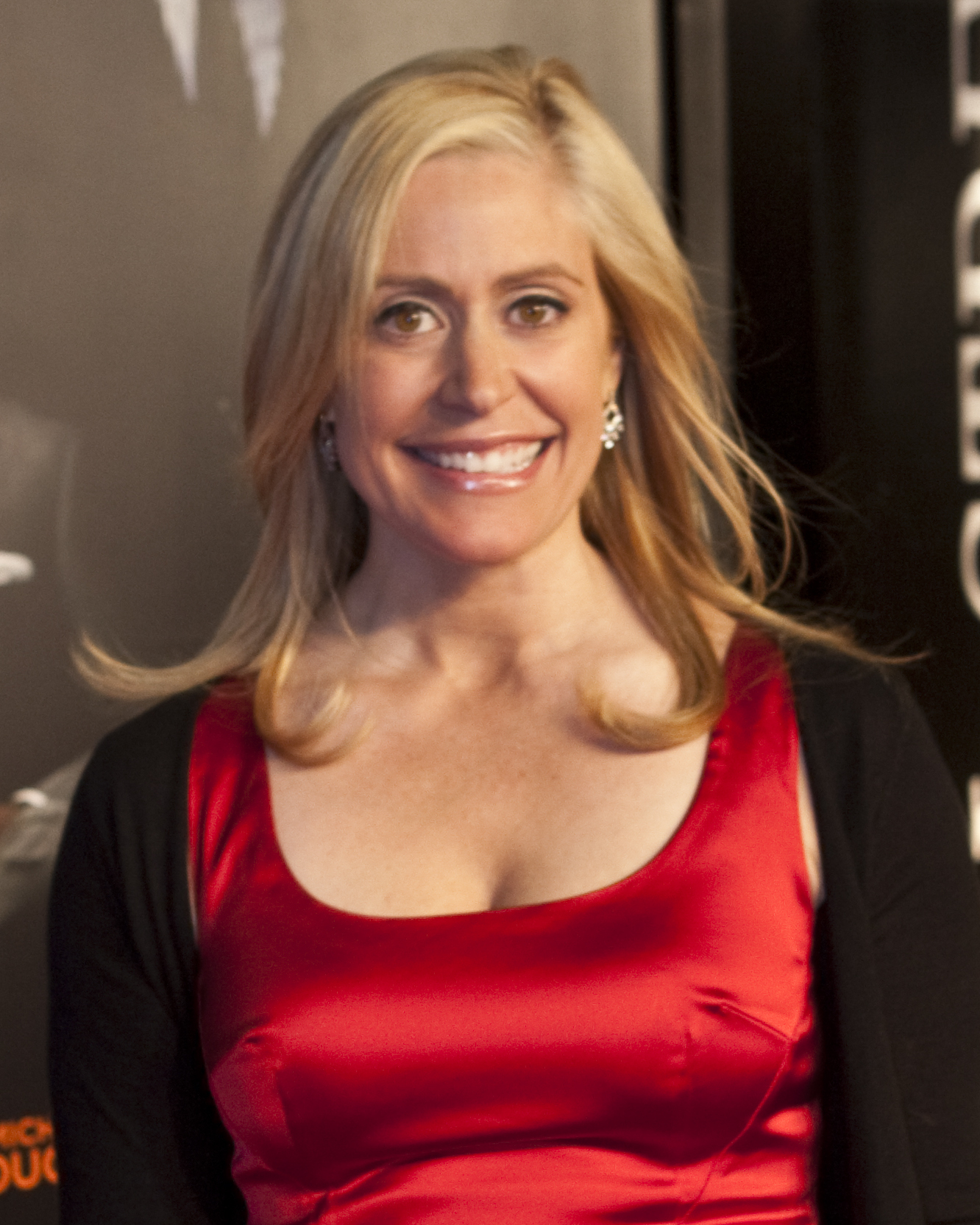
- Francis in 2010
- Born: Los Angeles, California, U.S.
- Other name: Missy Francis
- Education: Harvard University (B.A.)
- Occupations: News anchor; actress
- Years active: 1973–present
- Spouse: Wray Thorn (m. 1997)
- Children: 3

Melissa Francis is an American television news personality who last worked as an anchor and commentator for the Fox Business Network (FBN) and Fox News (FNC), departing in 2020. Previously, she worked as an actress.

Prior to FBN, she worked at CNBC. She had been the co-host of After The Bell weekday afternoons with Connell McShane. She also was an anchor on FNC's Happening Now newscast, and a regular panelist on FNC's afternoon talk show Outnumbered. In late October 2020, it was reported that she had been pushed out of Fox. In 2022, Fox paid her a $15 million settlement on a pay discrimination lawsuit. Melissa Francis is now with Newsmax.

== Education ==
Born and raised in Los Angeles, Francis graduated from Harvard University in 1995 with a Bachelor of Arts degree in economics.

== Career ==
=== Acting ===
Francis started her acting career on television by appearing in a Johnson & Johnson shampoo commercial at 6 months old. She was known for her role as Cassandra Cooper Ingalls on Little House on the Prairie, for two seasons. Other television appearances include two series regular roles: Morningstar/Eveningstar and Joe’s World, and three films including Man, Woman and Child, where she played Paula Beckwith. She has also had appearances in the television series St. Elsewhere in 1986 and the 1988 film Bad Dreams, where she played young Cynthia. Melissa appeared in nearly 100 commercials during her acting career. She is reportedly the inspiration for the fictional character Avery Jessup (conceived of and played by Elizabeth Banks) in the show 30 Rock, although Banks herself has denied this.

=== Journalism ===
Francis has worked as a reporter for CNBC and CNET.

In January 2012, Francis became an anchor for Fox Business Network.

In 2014, Francis became a recurring co-host of Fox News Channel's talk and news commentary program, Outnumbered. She also anchored FNC's Happening Now newscast.

==== Departure from Fox ====
In late October 2020, it was reported that Francis had been pushed out at Fox. She had not been seen on the network since early in the month. Her contract had expired about a year earlier and had not been renewed. The only communication on the issue from Francis herself came in a tweet, where she thanked her followers for their support. However, her profile on Twitter soon dropped any reference to Fox as well.

In late 2020, Francis filed a pay discrimination action against Fox. Francis claimed that Fox News underpaid her compared to her male colleagues, and she initiated legal claims against Fox. Fox and Francis reached a settlement in June 2022 whereby Fox paid Francis $15 million.

=== Writer ===
Francis authored a book in November 2012, Diary of a Stage Mother's Daughter: A Memoir, concerning the trials, tribulations and joys of having an overbearing mother; and in April 2017, published Lessons from the Prairie, relating childhood experiences from the show as applied to her adult life.

== Filmography ==
=== Film ===
Year	Title	Role	Notes
1979	Scavenger Hunt	Jennifer Motley	
1983	Man, Woman and Child	Paula Beckwith	
1988	Bad Dreams	Young Cynthia	
2009	Race to Witch Mountain	TV reporter	Uncredited
2012	The Dictator	Local News Reporter	

=== Television ===
Year	Title	Role	Notes
1974	The Ghost of Flight 401	Kid	TV movie
1979	Champions: A Love Story	Sally	TV movie
1979	Son-Rise: A Miracle of Love	Thea	TV movie
1979–1980	Joe's World	Linda Wabash	Main role
1980	Mork & Mindy	Little Mindy	Episode: "A Mommy for Mindy"
1980	Galactica 1980	Little Girl	Episode: "Galactica Discovers Earth Part II And III"
1980	When the Whistle Blows	Deenie	Episode: "Love Is a Four-Letter Word"
1981	Midnight Lace	Cathy, age 11	TV movie
1981	A Gun in the House	Diana Cates	TV movie
1981–1982	Little House on the Prairie	Cassandra Cooper Ingalls	Main role
1984	Something About Amelia	Beth Bennett	TV movie
1985	Hotel	Jodi Abbott	Episode: "Rallying Cry"
1985	CBS Schoolbreak Special	Tina	Episode: "The War Between the Classes"
1986	St. Elsewhere	Cynthia	Episode: "Family Affair"
1986	Morningstar/Eveningstar	Sarah Bishop	Main role
1988	A Year in the Life	Eunice	Episode: "Common Ground"
1989	ALF	Miss Williams	Episode: "Baby, Come Back"
1990	Hardball		Episode: "A Death in the Family"
