= Michael Wehmeyer =

American special education professor

- Born: October 9, 1957 (age 68)
- Education: University of Tulsa, University of Sussex, University of Texas at Dallas
- Scientific career
- Fields: Special education, Psychology
- Workplaces: University of Kansas

Michael Lee Wehmeyer (/ˈweɪmaɪ.ər/ WAY-mye-ər; born October 9, 1957) is Distinguished Professor Emeritus in and former chairperson of the Department of Special Education at the University of Kansas. His research focused on self-determination and self-determined learning, the application of positive psychology and strengths-based approaches to disability, and the education of students with intellectual or developmental disabilities. He is past Director and Senior Scientist at Kansas University's Beach Center on Disability. He also formerly directed the Kansas University Center on Developmental Disabilities.

== Education ==
Wehmeyer earned his BS and MA in Special Education in 1980 and 1982 from the University of Tulsa. In 2013, he was an alumni inductee of Phi Beta Kappa Arts and Sciences Honor Society-Beta of Oklahoma chapter at the University of Tulsa. He was a Rotary International Fellow at the University of Sussex in Brighton, England in 1987 and 1988, receiving the M.Sc. in Experimental Psychology from the Laboratory of Experimental Psychology and Centre for Research on Perception and Cognition at Sussex in 1988. He received his PhD in 1989 from the University of Texas at Dallas, in the subject of human development and communication sciences. In 2014, he received The University of Texas at Dallas Distinguished Alumni Award on behalf of the School of Behavioral and Brain Sciences.

== Research and teaching ==
Professor Wehmeyer's research has focused on the application of the self-determination construct to the disability context. Self-determination is a construct that has its origins in 17th- and 18th-century philosophical doctrines pertaining to free will and determinism. In the early 20th century, the discipline of psychology applied its experimental approach to issues pertaining to self-determination, examining the degree to which a person's actions or behaviors are ‘caused’ (e.g., determined) by internal factors or forces (auto-determinism or self-determination) or forces or factors external to the person (hetero-determinism or other-determined). Through much of the latter half of the 20th century the primary use of the self-determination construct was in its application in the field of motivational psychology, particularly in the context of Self-Determination Theory. In 1992, Wehmeyer proposed a definition of the construct and a general framework drawing from research and knowledge in education and psychology, referred to as the functional model of self-determination, which served as a catalyst in the development of autonomy-supportive interventions to promote student self-determination. Most recently, Wehmeyer and colleagues have introduced Causal Agency Theory, which extends work to create autonomy-motivating interventions from the functional theory to align with Self-Determination Theory and Action-Control Belief Theory to describe a developmental process by which people engage in causal action and become more self-determined.

Wehmeyer has been an author or editor on 50 books in the fields of special education and psychology, and has authored or co-authored more than 500 book chapters and journal articles. He is a co-author of the Supports Intensity Scales for Adults and Children of the American Association on Intellectual and Developmental Disabilities (AAIDD), and of the 11th Edition of the AAIDD Intellectual Disability Terminology, Classification, and Systems of Supports Manual.

He is a Fellow and former vice-president of the Americas of the International Association for the Scientific Study of Intellectual and Developmental Disabilities, a fellow of the American Psychological Association, Division 33 on Intellectual and Developmental Disabilities/Autism Spectrum Disorder, and is a fellow of the American Association on Intellectual and Developmental Disabilities, of which he is also a past president. He is a past co-editor of the AAIDD e-journal, Inclusion. Wehmeyer is a past-president of the Council for Exceptional Children's Division on Career Development and Transition, and a past-president of the Council for Exceptional Children's Division on Autism and Developmental Disabilities. From 2005 to 2010, he was the editor-in-chief of the journal Remedial and Special Education.

== Awards ==
Dr. Wehmeyer has received numerous awards for his research. In 2013, he received the Distinguished Researcher Award from The Arc of the United States, presented to a career academic researcher whose work has significantly advanced the field of research in intellectual and developmental disabilities. In 2015, Dr. Wehmeyer received the American Psychological Association Distinguished Contributions to the Advancement of Disability Issues in Psychology Award, the 2015 AAIDD Research Award for contributions that have contributed significantly to the body of scientific knowledge in the field of intellectual and developmental disabilities, and the Council for Exceptional Children, Division on Autism and Developmental Disabilities Burton Blatt Humanitarian Award, presented to a person who has made significant contributions to the field of intellectual disabilities, developmental disabilities, and/or autism. In the same year, Dr. Wehmeyer received the Higuchi-KU Endowment Research Achievement Awards, Balfour S. Jefferey Award, given in recognition of research achievement in the humanities and social sciences to an individual who may be described as having had a major and substantial impact and who has been of national and/or international interest. Dr. Wehmeyer was recognized with the 2016 Special Education Research Award from the Council for Exceptional Children, given to an individual or research team whose research has made significant contributions to the education of children and youth with exceptionalities. In 2024, Dr. Wehmeyer received the American Psychological Association, Division 33: Intellectual and Developmental Disabilities/Autism Spectrum Disorders Edgar A. Doll Award, a “career award that honors an individual for their substantial contributions to the understanding of intellectual and developmental disabilities throughout their career” and the American Association on Intellectual and Developmental Disabilities Distinguished Career Award presented by the Board of Directors of the American Association on Intellectual and Developmental Disabilities in acknowledgment of significant contributions to the Association over an enduring period of time in the field of intellectual and developmental disabilities.

== Publications ==
=== Selected Books ===
- Handbook of Research-Based Practices for Educating Students with Intellectual Disability 2017, Edited by M.L. Wehmeyer and K.A. Shogren*The story of intellectual disability: An evolution of meaning, understanding, and public perception 2013, Edited by M.L. Wehmeyer
- A Comprehensive Guide to Intellectual and Developmental Disabilities 2017, Edited by M.L. Wehmeyer, I. Brown, M. Percy, K.A. Shogren, and W.L.A. Fung
- Development of Self-Determination Through the Life-Course 2017, Edited by M.L. Wehmeyer, K.A. Shogren, T.D. Little, and S.J. Lopez
- The Praeger International Handbook of Special Education (Volumes 1-3) 2017, Edited by M.L. Wehmeyer and J.R. Patton
- Handbook of Positive Psychology in Intellectual and Developmental Disabilities 2017, Edited by K.A. Shogren, M.L. Wehmeyer, and N. Singh
- Strengths-Based Approaches to Educating All Learners with Disabilities: Beyond Special Education 2019, M.L. Wehmeyer
- Handbook of Adolescent Transition Education for Youth with Disabilities (2nd Edition) 2020, Edited by K.A. Shogren and M.L. Wehmeyer
- Teaching Students to Become Self-Determined Learners 2020, M.L. Wehmeyer and Y. Zhao
- Choice, Preference, and Disability: Promoting Self-Determination Across the Life Span 2020, R. Stancliffe, M.L. Wehmeyer, K.A. Shogren, and B. Abery
- The Palgrave Handbook of Positive Education 2021, M. Kern, and M.L. Wehmeyer
- Inclusive Education in a Strengths-Based Era: Mapping the Future of the Field 2021, M.L. Wehmeyer and J.K. Kurth
- Understanding Disability: The Positive Psychology of Personal Factors 2022, M.L. Wehmeyer and D. Dunn
- Good Blood, Bad Blood: Science, Nature, and the Myth of the Kallikaks 2022, J.D. Smith and M.L. Wehmeyer
- Exceptional Lives: Practice, Progress, and Dignity in Today's Schools (10th Edition) 2023, A.P. Turnbull, M.L. Wehmeyer, K.A. Shogren, M. Burke, and H.R. Turnbull

=== Selected Assessments and Curricula ===
- The Arc’s Self-Determination Scale 1995, M.L. Wehmeyer and K. Kelchner
- Whose Future is it Anyway? A Student-Directed Transition Planning Process (2nd Edition) 2004, M.L. Wehmeyer, M. Lawrence, K. Kelchner, S. Palmer, N. Garner, and J. Soukup
- Supports Intensity Scale: Adult Version 2015, J.R. Thompson, B. Bryant, R.L. Schalock, K.A. Shogren, M.J. Tasse, M.L. Wehmeyer, E.M. Campbell, C. Hughes, and D. Rotholz
- Supports Intensity Scale: Children’s Version 2016, J.R. Thompson, M.L. Wehmeyer, C. Hughes, K.A. Shogren, H. Seo, T.D. Little, R. Schalock, R.E. Realon, S.R. Copeland, J.R. Patton, E. Polloway, D. Sheldon, S. Tanis, and M.J. Tasse
- Self-Determination Inventory: Self-Report Version 2017, K.A. Shogren, M.L. Wehmeyer, S.B. Palmer, A. Forber-Pratt, T.D. Little, and S.J. Lopez
- The Self-Determined Learning Model of Instruction: Teacher’s Guide 2017, K.A. Shogren, M.L. Wehmeyer, K.M. Burke, and S.B. Palmer

== Archives ==
Dr. Wehmeyer's extensive collection of the history of intellectual disability and the American eugenics movement is housed at The Archives of the History of American Psychology at the Cummings Center for the History of Psychology at The University of Akron.
