= Osias Tager =

British businessman

- Born: 21 June 1914; Hannover, German Empire
- Died: 26 March 2005 (aged 90); United Kingdom
- Occupation: Businessman
- Known for: Philanthropy
- Spouse: Minnie Tager
- Children: Romie, Helen, Sharon, Henry

Osias Tager (21 June 1914 – 26 March 2005) was a British businessman who was one of the founders of the Ravenswood community, a residential community for adults with learning difficulties.

== Early life and family ==
Tager was born in Hannover, German Empire. He married Minnie who died from cancer in 1974 aged 54. Tager and Minnie had children Romie, Helen, Sharon, and Henry.

== Ravenswood ==
In 1953, Tager was one of the founders of the Jewish Association for Mentally Handicapped Children, now the Ravenswood Foundation, a residential community in Berkshire run by the charity Norwood that provides a home for adults with learning difficulties. Tager's daughter Sharon lives at Ravenswood and his son Henry also lived there until his death in 2004. In 2006, Romie and Esther Tager gave the centre £1m in memory of Romie's father.
