= Helen Tager-Flusberg =

Autism researcher

Helen Tager-Flusberg is an American psychologist who is professor in the Department of Psychological and Brain Science at Boston University and the Departments of Anatomy and Neurobiology and Pediatrics at Boston University School of Medicine (BUSM). She is the Director of the Center for Autism Research Excellence at Boston University.

== Personal life and education ==
Tager-Flusberg was born in England. She received her bachelor's degree from the University College London in psychology. She moved to the US in the 1970s and obtained her PhD in Experimental Psychology from Harvard University in 1978. Her dissertation compared children with autism to children with severe developmental language disorders in studies on syntax, semantics and object play.

She was a professor in the psychology department at the University of Massachusetts (UMass) until 2001, and between 1996 and 2001, she was a Senior Scientist at the UMass Medical Center. She has been at Boston University since 2001, initially at the School of Medicine and since 2009 in the College of Arts & Sciences.

== Career ==
Her research interests are in autism, Williams syndrome, Down syndrome, and specific language impairment, which she has researched since the late 70s.

=== Appointments ===
Tager-Flusberg was President of the International Society for Autism Research (2011–2013), and served on the National Deafness and Communication Disorders Advisory Council from 2012 to 2016.

She is on the editorial boards of Autism and Autism Research; and an Associate Editor of the British Journal of Psychology and is Associate Editor for the Journal of Neurodevelopmental Disorders.

== Recognition ==
Ken Wexler, a professor of cognitive science at Massachusetts Institute of Technology, said: "If you asked somebody, 'Who are the famous people studying language in autism?' she's the first name to come to mind."

== Selected publications ==
As of 2012, Tager-Flusberg has edited four books and published more than 200 journal articles and individual chapters in books; some of her books are:

- Tager-Flusberg, Helen (2005). Autism And Williams Syndrome. Essays in Developmental Psychology. UK: Psychology Press. ISBN 978-1841690087.
- Tager-Flusberg, Helen (1993). Constraints on Language Acquisition: Studies of Atypical Children. L. Erlbaum Associates. ISBN 978-0805806670.
- Tager-Flusberg, Helen (1999). Neurodevelopmental Disorders. Developmental Cognitive Neuroscience. A Bradford Book. ISBN 978-0262201162.
- Baron-Cohen, Simon; Tager-Flusberg, Helen; Cohen, Donald J., eds. (2000). Understanding Other Minds: Perspectives from Developmental Cognitive Neuroscience. Oxford University Press. ISBN 978-0198524465.
- Cohen, Donald J.; Baron-Cohen, Simon; Tager-Flusberg, Helen, eds. (1994). Understanding Other Minds: Perspectives from Autism. Oxford Medical Publications. ISBN 978-0192620569.
