= Randi J. Hagerman =

American pediatrician

- Education: Stanford University
- Known for: Fragile-X Syndrome and FXTAS
- Scientific career
- Fields: Behavior genetics, Autism Fragile X Syndrome, behavioral pharmacology
- Workplaces: University of California, Davis
- Website: www.ucdmc.ucdavis.edu/mindinstitute/ourteam/faculty/hagerman_r.html

Randi J. Hagerman is an American physician and the medical director of MIND Institute at the University of California, Davis. She works for the pediatrics department under the division of child development and behavior. She is an internationally recognized researcher in the field of genetics of autism spectrum disorder with special focus on genomic instability. Along with her husband Paul Hagerman, she discovered the Fragile X-associated tremor/ataxia syndrome (FXTAS), a neurological disorder that affects older male and rare female carriers of fragile X. She was recognized on a list of the world's top female scientists

== Work ==
Hagerman has written over 200 peer-reviewed articles and book chapters on neurodevelopmental disorders. Some of the specific topics of her papers include repeat expansion and the genetics of neurodevelopmental disorders (e.g. Fragile-X). She also works on an editorial board to help edit the publications Journal of Developmental and Behavioral Pediatrics and Molecular Autism.

== Awards ==
- Jerrett Cole Award, National Fragile X Foundation, 1992
- Bonfils-Stanton Foundation Award for Science including Medicine, 1993
- Namesake (with Paul Hagerman), Hagerman Award for Research in FXTAS, International Association for the Study of Intellectual Deficiency, 2004
- Lifetime Achievement Award, National Fragile X Foundation, 2008

== Education ==
- M.D., Medicine, F.A.A.P., Stanford University School of Medicine, Palo Alto, California, 1975
- B.S., Zoology, UC Davis, Davis, California, 1971
- Stanford University School of Medicine, Palo Alto, California, 1976–77
- University of California, San Diego, La Jolla, California, 1979–80
