= The Kiss Quotient =

2018 novel by Helen Hoang

- First edition
- Author: Helen Hoang
- Language: English
- Genre: Fiction, Romance
- Publisher: Berkley Books
- Publication date: June 2018
- ISBN: 9780451490803
- Followed by: The Bride Test

The Kiss Quotient is a 2018 novel written by Helen Hoang. It follows Stella, an autistic woman who hires an escort in order to explore intimacy with other people.

== Development ==
Hoang wrote the first draft of what would become The Kiss Quotient within ten weeks. The manuscript went through several drafts before she entered the online pitch contest Pitch Wars, where she revised it again with the help of her mentor Brighton Walsh, working for eight months.

Hoang states that she initially wanted to write a gender-swapped Pretty Woman, but was stuck when examining why a "successful, beautiful woman would hire an escort." During a meeting with her daughter's preschool teacher, Hoang found out that her daughter is on the autism spectrum. She researched autism and realized that she, too, is autistic, and used that as the basis for the book's concept.

== Overview ==
The Kiss Quotient is a book where the main character is an autistic woman named Stella Lane. She "thinks math is the only thing that unites the universe." Stella Lane is a successful econometrician, due to her job she has little experience dating for a thirty year old woman. Stella decides to hire a professional, Michael Phan, no nonsense. As the relationship progresses the two realize that they do find some sense in their no nonsense ventures.

== Reception ==
The Kiss Quotient received a positive review from Publishers Weekly. It had an initial print run of 100,000 copies. As of July 2018, the book was in its fourth printing.

In August 2018, it was announced that Pilgrim Media Group acquired the film, TV, and other media rights for The Kiss Quotient and partnered with Lionsgate for an expected domestic release.

New York Public Library listed The Kiss Quotient as one of its Best Books of 2018.

== Additions ==
A sequel titled The Bride Test was published by Berkley in May 2019. The novel is about Esme, a hotel maid who gets offered to accompany Khai to a wedding: Khai is the autistic cousin of Michael mentioned in The Kiss Quotient. The third book in the series, titled The Heart Principle, was published in 2021.
