= MIND Institute =

Research institute for neurodevelopmental disorders

The UC Davis MIND Institute (Medical Investigation of Neurodevelopmental Disabilities) is a research and treatment center affiliated with the University of California, Davis, with facilities located on the UC Davis Medical Center campus in Sacramento, California. The institute is a consortium of scientists, educators, physicians and parents dedicated to researching the causes of and treatments for autism spectrum disorders, fragile X syndrome, and other neurodevelopmental disorders. The director of the MIND institute is Dr. Leonard Abbeduto.

== Origins ==
Parents of autistic children led the drive to raise funds for the cause, anticipating the institute could become the premiere autism research institute in the world. Among the parents behind the institute are Chuck and Sarah Gardner, whose son Chas has been diagnosed with autism. Chuck is a Sacramento area building contractor and co-founder of the institute along with his wife, Sarah, a television anchorwoman for Sacramento (KCRA 3).

The institute's largest contribution came from the California State Legislature, which provided $34 million to the institute for autism research. The efforts enabled construction of the institute's facility at the UC Davis Medical Center campus in Sacramento. After the major funding from the State, Rick Rollens, the former Secretary of the California State Senate and one of the leaders in the effort to create the institute, said the National Institutes of Health (NIH) was funding genetic-oriented research into autism, and that the MIND Institute was created by parents demanding that scientists look at other causes.

== Interdisciplinary research teams ==
The MIND Institute brings together experts in fields as diverse as molecular genetics and clinical pediatrics, using a multidisciplinary approach to treating and finding cures for neurodevelopmental disorders.

David G. Amaral is the research director of the MIND Institute and a professor in the Department of Psychiatry and the center for Neuroscience, a neuroscientist who studies the organization of memory systems in the brain. Sally J. Rogers is a specialist in developmental psychology and professor of psychiatry and behavior science for the institute. Jacqueline Crawley is a behavioral neuroscientist and an expert on rodent behavioral analysis and the director of IDDRC Rodent Behavior Core in MIND Institute.

== Fragile X and fragile X-associated tremor/ataxia syndrome ==
MIND institute has a major focus on studying neurodevelopmental disorders caused by genetic instability, e.g. fragile X syndrome. Randi J. Hagerman and Paul J. Hagerman have been studying genotype-phenotype correlations in fragile X and potential discovery of targeted treatment.

== Prevalence study ==
In October 2002, the institute released a study appearing to confirm that the prevalence of autism has risen steeply. The study was led by Robert Byrd, whose team gathered information on 684 children with developmental disabilities from California's Department of Developmental Services regional centers. Byrd's team's reported autism was on the rise in California, and that some of the increase was real and could not be explained by artificial factors such as misclassification and diagnostic criteria changes, nor by migration of children into California. However, a 2006 analysis found that special education data poorly measured prevalence because so many cases were undiagnosed, and that the 1994–2003 U.S. increase was associated with declines in other diagnostic categories, indicating that diagnostic substitution had occurred in the U.S. overall (though not in California in particular). The current consensus is that the rise in the number of autism cases is largely attributable to changes in diagnostic practices, referral patterns, availability of services, age at diagnosis, and public awareness, though as-yet-unidentified contributing environmental risk factors cannot be ruled out.

However, a study published in 2009 found that the seven- to eight-fold increase in the number children born in California with autism since 1990 cannot be explained by either changes in diagnosis or counting. Published in the January 2009 issue of Epidemiology, results also suggest that research should shift from genetics to the host of chemicals and infectious microbes in the environment that are likely at the root of changes in the neurodevelopment of California's children.

== Autism Phenome Project ==
In 2006, the MIND Institute launched its Autism Phenome Project, with the objective of identifying biological and behavioral patterns in order to define distinct autism spectrum subtypes. According to Amaral, "The tremendous variation in autism leads us to believe that it is a group of disorders rather than a single one."

The longitudinal study will enroll 1800 children, aged two to four: 900 diagnosed with autism, 450 with developmental delays, and 450 non-autistic control subjects. The study will involve systematic analyses of immune systems, brain structures, genetics, environmental exposures, blood proteins and other developmental indicators, and the medical evaluations will continue for several years. Over time, it is anticipated that this information will assist in determining the appropriate supports or therapies to fulfill each individual's specific requirements.
