= Frank Rusch =

Frank R. Rusch (born February 22, 1949) is an American educational psychologist and Professor Emeritus, University of Illinois Urbana-Champaign. His research has focused on self-instructional strategies, coworker and natural supports, benefit-cost analysis, and model program evaluation. He is particularly known for his contributions to the conceptualization and implementation of supported employment and secondary transition services for people with disabilities. His contributions to supported employment include the establishment of the first "supported work" model in the fall of 1975 at the University of Washington while a doctoral student.

== Early career ==
Rusch received his undergraduate degree in psychology from the University of Oregon in 1971. He went on to earn a master's degree at the University of Oregon in 1972 in special education. Rusch completed his doctoral program in 1977 in special education and began his career at the University of Illinois at Urbana-Champaign. He replicated his supported employment program in 1978 with the addition of an apartment-training program that provided employees with the training and support that they required to remain independent of adult day programs and segregated housing options typically available at the time. Eventually, Rusch turned his attention toward special education high school students and how they were being prepared for work.

His early research career at the University of Illinois also included testing a model of supported employment that became the preferred approach for individuals with disabilities in the United States Widely recognized as responsible for the birth of supported employment as an alternative to sheltered employment, Rusch and his students influenced the way special education and rehabilitation funded training, evaluation and long-term employment in this country. Over a five-year period, Rusch and his students helped start over 125 supported employment programs in the states of Illinois and Kansas. These demonstrations led to over 100 publications by his students between the period beginning 1987 and ending in 1994. His first text was recognized by the President's Committee on Mental Retardation as the first text to overview the methods that should be used to promote employment among persons with disabilities, leading to his being awarded the American Association on Mental Retardation's "Educator of the Year Award". During this period he worked with Senator Paul Simon's staff in crafting changes in legislation that promoted the emergence of transition service for high school students in an effort to better prepare youth to escape the potential of sheltered employment by being better prepared for work and independence after high school.

== Later career ==
Over the past 30 years, Rusch and his students have been studying self-instructional strategies that utilize coworkers as change agents, and issues related to secondary education reform, including program development (cost-benefit analysis). He has also served as associate editor for numerous journals and has published over 200 books, chapters and articles. Rusch is one of the most-cited social scientists in the country; he was identified as the 15 most productive researcher in the field of intellectual disability worldwide.

Rusch and his colleagues at the University of Illinois established the Transition Research Institute, and later the National Transition Alliance, which was designed to improve transition services and outcomes, build states' capacity to form coalitions that better serve students with disabilities in the education mainstream, provide technical assistance to states implementing school-to-work systems change, and produce and disseminate information related to transition. Collaborators in the Alliance included the National Transition Network at Minnesota, the Academy for Educational Development, the National Alliance for Business, the National Council of Chief State School Officers, and the National Association of State Directors of Special Education.

Research methodologies utilized by Rusch have included secondary analysis of the outcomes reported by the federally mandated Longitudinal Study of Youth in Transition, matched-pairs analysis of the effectiveness of a high school education, qualitative analysis of model programs, and meta-evaluations of model program outcomes. Several of Rusch's publications identified new methods of inquiry, including meta-analysis using repeated measures, withdrawal designs for use with intra-subject experimental designs, and new conceptual frameworks to better understand cost-benefit analysis of model programs.

Rusch joined the Penn State faculty in 2004, and continued his research related to utilizing cognitive strategies to promote learning among persons with intellectual disability. He was also involved in a ten-year follow-up study of coworker involvement, a 25-year retrospective analysis of supported employment, and the examination of a secondary model intervention utilizing experimental and control subjects attending schools in the greater Philadelphia school district and surrounding area.

== Publications ==
- Beyond High School: Preparing Adolescents for Tomorrow's Challenges (2nd ed., Pearson, 2008)
- Rethinking Disabilities: The Emergence of New Definitions, Concepts and Communities (edited with P. Devlieger and D. Pfeiffer, Garant Publishers, 2003)
- Beyond High School: Transition From School-to-Work (edited with Janis Chadsey, Wadsworth Publishing, 1998)
- Transition from School to Adult Life: Models, Linkages, and Policy (Brooks/Cole, 1992)
- Supported Employment: Models, Methods, and Issues (Sycamore Publishing, 1990)
- When Will Persons in Supported Employment Need Less Support? (with D. E. Mithaug, J. E. Martin, J. V. Husch, and M. Agran, Ascent Publications, 1988)
- Why Special Education Graduates Fail? How to Teach Them to Succeed (with D. E. Mithaug, J. E. Martin, and M. Agran, Ascent Publications, 1988)
- Introduction to Special Education and Behavior Analysis (with Terry Rose and Charles R. Greenwood, Prentice-Hall, 1988)
- Competitive Employment Issues and Strategies (edited, Paul H. Brookes Publishing, 1986)
- Vocational Training for Mentally Retarded Adults: A Behavior Analytic Approach (with Dennis E. Mithaug, Research Press, 1980)

== See also ==
- Special Education
- Disability studies
- Exceptional education
- Least restrictive environment
- Post Secondary Transition For High School Students with Disabilities
- Supported employment
