= Early Start Denver Model =

Method of early intervention for autism

The Early Start Denver Model (ESDM) is a method of intervention for autistic toddlers and preschoolers that combines a developmental, play-based approach with teaching techniques drawn from applied behavior analysis (ABA). American psychologists Sally J. Rogers and Geraldine Dawson developed it from the Denver Model, a play-based program for autistic preschoolers that Rogers and her colleagues began in the 1980s, adding techniques from pivotal response treatment. The ESDM is counted among the naturalistic developmental behavioral interventions; its developers describe it as rooted in ABA, but whether it qualifies as ABA practice is disputed. Rogers and Dawson set out the model in a 2010 manual, which had a second edition in 2025. Therapists and parents deliver the intervention through play and daily routines, with objectives drawn from an assessment of the child's skills that is repeated every 12 weeks.

Trials led by the model's developers have found gains in IQ, language or adaptive behavior in some cases and no differences between groups in others, and a 2025 trial in France and Belgium found no significant benefit on its primary outcome. Meta-analyses have reported improvements mainly in cognition and language. Reviewers have criticized the methods of ESDM research and the involvement of the model's developers in most studies, points the developers have partly disputed. A cost analysis based on the first trial concluded that the extra cost of the ESDM was offset within a few years by lower use of other services. Public bodies in Australia, Brazil, France and the United States refer to the ESDM, or to the Denver program, in evidence reviews, recommendations, coverage rules or treatment information.

== Development ==
The ESDM grew out of the Denver Model. That model was based on Piaget's theory of cognitive development. Rogers devised it while she was at the University of Colorado, as a preschool intervention in which young autistic children were taught during their play activities, and for that reason it was first called the "play school model". Begun by Rogers and her colleagues in the 1980s, it was a developmentally based group program for autistic children aged 24 to 60 months. The ESDM adapts and extends it for intensive early intervention with toddlers as young as 12 months. Its other foundations include pivotal response treatment (PRT), an ABA-based teaching approach that emphasizes the child's initiative and spontaneity; the explicit use of PRT strategies is one of the differences between the ESDM and the original Denver Model. The ESDM was the product of a collaboration between Rogers, Dawson and their colleagues at the University of Washington Autism Center, the University of California, Davis, and JFK Partners at the University of Colorado Health Sciences Center.

In 2010, Rogers and Dawson published Early Start Denver Model for Young Children with Autism: Promoting Language, Learning, and Engagement, a manual that describes the model in detail. The ESDM is commercially available as a standardized intervention. Guilford Press published a second edition in December 2025, retitled Early Start Denver Model for Young Autistic Children; the publisher presents it as written from a neurodiversity-affirming perspective. The ESDM is generally intended for children between 12 and 48 months of age.

== Description ==
Teaching takes place in "joint activity routines": games and everyday routines that an adult shares with the child and that are built on the child's own choices and initiative. They are modeled on the early exchanges through which caregivers support the learning of typically developing children, either face to face, as in peekaboo, songs or clapping games, or around objects, as when building a tower of blocks, and they are meant to draw the child into social engagement and learning. Each child's learning objectives are pursued during these routines through behavioral procedures, among them prompting, shaping, fading and chaining, which are specified in a 13-item fidelity checklist. Progress is recorded against defined mastery criteria, and decision trees indicate how to change the teaching when it is slower than expected. Operant conditioning principles and PRT strategies are used both to teach new skills and to deal with unwanted behavior.

Several core features of the Denver Model were kept in the ESDM. A developmental curriculum covering every area of development is delivered by an interdisciplinary team, in partnership with the child's parents. Particular attention goes to engagement with other people, to both verbal and nonverbal communication, and to the cognitive side of play in two-person play routines. The model also aims to develop imitation that is fluent, reciprocal and spontaneous, covering gestures, facial movements and expressions, and the use of objects.

=== Classification ===
The ESDM is grouped with the naturalistic developmental behavioral interventions (NDBIs), a category proposed in 2015 for practices that brought together behavioral and developmental theory. In these interventions, learning is embedded in play and everyday routines, and techniques derived from behavioral principles are delivered through adult–child interactions matched to the child's developmental level.

Its authors describe the ESDM as rooted in ABA, but some states, agencies and scholars regard it as an ABA practice and others do not. In a 2021 article, Giacomo Vivanti and Aubyn C. Stahmer examined the model against the seven dimensions that define applied behavior analysis and concluded that it is designed to meet them and can be placed among ABA programs. The Centers for Disease Control and Prevention (CDC) describes it as a broad developmental approach based on ABA principles. By 2008, the Denver approach had come to use some ABA procedures, while newer ABA approaches had adopted many of the play-based learning activities first used in Rogers's approach.

=== Assessment ===
The intervention starts with an assessment of the child's skills in language, social skills, imitation, cognition, play, and motor and self-help skills, made with the ESDM Curriculum Checklist, which combines observation with parent report. Rogers and Dawson recommend using this first assessment as a baseline before treatment begins. Objectives meant to be reached within 12 weeks are written from it, and at the end of each 12-week period the child is assessed again with the checklist and new objectives are set. The checklist was published by Rogers and Dawson in 2010, and the manual reproduces it with descriptions of its items. A second edition of the checklist, published in December 2025, added items for infants from six months of age.

=== Intervention plan ===
The results of the first assessment are used to draw up an intervention plan, which describes the activities that parents and therapists will carry out with the child. The curriculum was devised by professionals from several disciplines, among them developmental and clinical psychology, ABA, early childhood special education, speech–language pathology and occupational therapy, and an interdisciplinary team oversees each child's plan and progress; the objectives are renewed after each 12-week assessment. Clinicians and caregivers set the goals together, and the therapist, the caregivers or both then work on them in different settings. The model is designed for transdisciplinary teams that may include behavior analysts, early childhood educators and allied health professionals, and it can be delivered by therapists, through parents, or by teachers to groups in day care or preschool settings.

Parents are coached and take part in the program. Much of the ESDM work with families consists of coaching parents in the model's interaction techniques, and when the intervention is delivered mainly through the parents, one main professional usually works with them. In the parent-implemented version of the model (P-ESDM), a therapist coaches the parents in weekly sessions.

The ESDM places special emphasis on five of the curriculum's domains: imitation, nonverbal communication (including joint attention), verbal communication, social development (including emotion sharing), and play.

== Efficacy ==
Many studies have examined the use of the ESDM with autistic children.

=== Clinical trials ===
Rogers and Dawson have conducted different trials of their methods. The first randomized controlled trial of the ESDM, published in 2010 by Dawson, Rogers and six colleagues, included 48 children who had been diagnosed with autism spectrum disorder at 18 to 30 months of age. For two years, the children in one group received the ESDM from trained therapists and from their parents, while those in the other were referred to the interventions commonly available in the community. The therapy offered added up to 20 hours a week, in two-hour sessions twice a day on five days, but because of illness, vacations and other reasons the children actually received a mean of 15.2 hours; the parents, trained twice a month by the lead therapist, reported using ESDM strategies for a mean of 16.3 hours a week. At the end of the trial, the ESDM group showed significant improvements over the community group in IQ, adaptive behavior and diagnosis. Its mean composite cognitive score had risen by 17.6 points, against 7.0 points in the comparison group, and seven of its children (30%) had their diagnosis changed from autistic disorder to pervasive developmental disorder not otherwise specified, against one child (5%) in the comparison group.

Rogers and Dawson were also among the authors of a 2015 follow-up of 39 children from that trial, who were assessed at age 6, two years after the intervention had ended, by clinicians who did not know which group each child had been in. Core autism symptoms had not differed between the groups at the end of treatment, at age 4, but over the follow-up period they improved more in the ESDM group than in the community group, and at age 6 the ESDM group also had better adaptive behavior; over those two years it had received significantly fewer services. The groups did not differ significantly in intellectual functioning at age 6. On average, the children in the ESDM group kept the gains in intellectual ability, adaptive behavior, symptom severity and challenging behavior that they had made during the intervention. The authors suggested that the earlier gains might have generalized to new areas of functioning, and described the study as the first to examine whether ESDM intervention begun before 30 months of age changes the longer-term course of autism.

Rogers and Dawson also co-authored, with six others, a randomized controlled trial published in 2012 that tested a brief version of the model delivered by parents (P-ESDM): 12 weeks of low-intensity intervention, with one hour a week of therapist contact, for 98 toddlers aged 14 to 24 months who were at risk for autism. The children's outcomes and the quality of parent–child interaction did not differ between the P-ESDM group and the community group, although both groups made progress; across the whole sample, the children who started younger and those who received more hours of intervention improved more on most measures. A later trial of two versions of parent-implemented ESDM, with 45 children aged 12 to 30 months, found that parents who received an enhanced form of coaching improved their interaction skills more than the other parents, but the children's outcomes did not differ between the groups.

A trial at three sites, published in 2019, assigned 118 children aged 14 to 24 months to the ESDM or to community interventions for 27 months. When the data from the three sites were pooled, the ESDM group showed a significant advantage in language, the primary outcome, though one site on its own showed no significant group difference; developmental quotient, autism severity and adaptive behavior did not differ significantly between the groups. The authors called this a partial replication of the 2010 trial's language findings. In another multisite trial, published in 2021, 87 children with a mean age of 23.4 months received either the ESDM or early intensive behavioral intervention using discrete trial teaching, each at 15 or 25 hours a week for 12 months; neither the style nor the intensity of the intervention had overall effects on the four outcomes measured.

A trial at five child and adolescent mental health services in France and Belgium, published in 2025, randomly assigned 180 children aged 19 to 36 months either to 12 hours a week of ESDM in addition to their usual treatment or to usual treatment alone. After 24 months, the added ESDM had not significantly improved overall developmental quotient, the trial's primary outcome. Its authors, who had not been able to replicate the results of the 2010 trial, proposed that the low developmental level of their participants at entry might explain the absence of an effect, and wrote that their findings suggested that ESDM combined with usual treatment could not be universally recommended for young children with autism spectrum disorder.

=== Reviews and meta-analyses ===
A 2016 systematic review, which found 15 studies of the ESDM covering 209 children and judged nearly half of them to have weaknesses in quality or rigor, described the ESDM as "a potentially promising intervention" whose effectiveness needed further high-quality research. Most of the studies reported positive results for the children, parents or therapists, and the child outcomes reported as generally positive included cognitive skills, language, imitation, attentiveness and social initiation.

In a 2019 review for the Association for Science in Autism Treatment (ASAT), Kathleen Holehan and Thomas Zane concluded that the ESDM could not yet be accepted as an evidence-based practice and that further replications were needed. In their assessment, research on the model lacked experimental control, empirical validity and objective measurement of treatment effects: in most studies, children in either group could also receive other community treatment, and most studies had involved at least one of the model's original developers, raising questions of bias and replicability. They recommended more randomized controlled trials, comparisons with other treatments and of costs, and replication by independent researchers.

Rogers, Dawson and two colleagues replied that the review had left out several key studies, including four randomized controlled trials, that some ESDM research did not involve the developers, and that in the trials funded by the National Institutes of Health in which the developers took part, the data had been managed and analyzed by evaluators independent of the investigators. On the two methodological criticisms, they argued that outcomes in the ESDM trials had been measured by clinicians who did not know which group each child was in, a standard way of keeping measurement objective, and that other treatments did not weaken the trials: barring families from them would be unethical, and randomization spread their influence equally across the groups, which ruled out a systematic bias in favor of either. The reviewers accepted that some studies did not involve the developers and that they had missed some recent ones, while maintaining that independent replication was the best safeguard against bias. They stood by their criticisms on measurement and on other treatments: for them, objective measurement meant direct observation of behavior, not the standardized scores from rating scales and surveys that made up most of the outcome measures in ESDM research, and the argument from randomization was "a statistical solution, not a real solution", since, with other treatments added, the ESDM had never been tested on its own.

In a 2022 treatment summary, ASAT noted that nine of the ten studies included in a 2017 systematic review had at least one of the original developers among their researchers, and that this review had judged the ESDM promising but not yet an evidence-based practice. The summary concluded that, at the time, methodological issues kept the ESDM from being considered a fully evidence-based treatment, and called for further randomized trials by independent researchers using naive raters and objective outcome measures.

A meta-analysis of 12 studies with a total of 640 children, published in 2020 and co-authored by Rogers, found a moderate overall effect in favor of the ESDM over control groups, which received treatment as usual, waitlist control, general information, referral to other services or a different intervention. The effect came mainly from cognition and language, with Hedges' g values of 0.412 and 0.408 respectively, while autism symptoms, adaptive behavior, social communication, and restricted and repetitive behaviors showed no significant effect. Half of the included studies did not assign children to groups at random, and the authors found a risk of small-study bias. A separate meta-analysis using 11 studies described as high-quality randomized controlled trials, with 624 participants, analyzed results in four major domains related to autism (autism symptoms, language, cognition, and social communication). It found that children receiving the ESDM showed significant improvements in the cognition (g = 0.28), autism symptoms (g = 0.27), and language (g = 0.29) domains, but not in social communication; the effects on autism symptoms and language were larger in studies from Asian countries than in those from Western countries.

A 2021 meta-analysis of 27 studies of NDBIs, the class of interventions to which the ESDM belongs, found effects on social communication, language, play and cognition, but its authors' confidence in these effects was somewhat limited by concerns over study quality, in particular the heavy use of outcome measures at high risk of detection bias. An updated review by the same research program, published in 2023 and covering non-pharmacological interventions for young autistic children, found that in randomized controlled trials NDBIs had significant effects on several outcomes; once outcomes at high risk of detection bias were excluded, the only significant effect left was that of NDBIs on measures of the diagnostic characteristics of autism. Because adverse events had been poorly monitored and reported, the authors could not weigh the possible benefits of the interventions against possible harms.

=== Cost ===
A 2017 study co-authored by Rogers and Dawson compared the health-related services used by the 39 children of the 2010 trial who were followed up at age 6, and what those services cost. Its authors concluded that the costs of the ESDM were fully offset within a few years after the intervention. In the period after treatment, the children from the ESDM group used less ABA or early intensive behavioral intervention, occupational and physical therapy, and speech therapy than those from the community group, a significant saving of about $19,000 per child each year. While the intervention lasted, their annualized total health-related costs had been about $14,000 higher, a difference that did not reach statistical significance and that was partly reduced by their lower use of other ABA services and of speech therapy. The authors noted that their sample gave them little statistical power for some cost categories, and that they had not measured caregivers' time, a cost that is higher in the ESDM because of its parent coaching.

== Usage in countries ==
Autism's diagnostic criteria, like its treatment approaches, have changed considerably over time.

=== Australia ===
The National Disability Insurance Scheme (NDIS) of the Australian government publishes summaries of an evidence review of interventions for autistic children carried out by the Autism CRC. The summaries list the ESDM among the "naturalistic developmental behavioural interventions". Drawing on two systematic reviews rated as being of moderate quality, they report positive effects of the ESDM on communication, cognition, general outcomes and three caregiver outcomes (interaction strategies, social and emotional wellbeing, and satisfaction), and null effects on overall autistic characteristics, social communication, restricted and repetitive behaviors, and adaptive behavior. The University of Wollongong stated that families could use NDIS funding for the full cost of its ESDM group workshop for parents and carers and of its 12-week ESDM parent-coaching program.

=== Brazil ===
In June 2022, the Agência Nacional de Saúde Suplementar (ANS), Brazil's regulator of private health plans, approved a rule broadening the coverage owed to plan members with pervasive developmental disorders, the group of conditions that includes autism spectrum disorder. Since July 1, 2022, plans have had to cover whatever method or technique the attending physician prescribes for a patient with any of the disorders under code F84 of the International Classification of Diseases. The rule also extended unlimited sessions with speech therapists, psychologists, occupational therapists and physical therapists to all of those disorders. When it announced the rule, the ANS named the ESDM, ABA, sensory integration and the Picture Exchange Communication System among the existing approaches to these disorders, and stated that the patient's health team should choose the method together with the family.

=== France ===
In March 2012, the Haute Autorité de Santé (HAS) of France adopted a good-practice recommendation, drawn up with the agency Anesm, on coordinated educational and therapeutic interventions for children and adolescents with autism and other pervasive developmental disorders. For children, it advised comprehensive, individualized and coordinated interventions that start before age four and have an educational, behavioral and developmental basis. Among the programs evaluated up to September 2011, the Denver developmental program and ABA-based interventions received grade B (présomption scientifique, "scientific presumption"), and TEACCH grade C. The recommendation observed that Denver-type developmental programs draw on ABA principles, and that, compared with eclectic practices, such developmental and behavioral programs had been shown to improve IQ, communication and language over the medium term, with about half of the children improving. By 2015, the ESDM was being described as one of the major programs that the HAS had recommended since 2012 for treating children with autism spectrum disorder.

=== United States ===
By 2020, every US state and the District of Columbia had passed laws requiring health insurers to cover autism-related health services for children, although the laws contain exemptions and differ in limits such as the maximum age covered and spending caps. Some state insurance mandates name ABA specifically, and the ESDM is treated as an ABA practice for funding purposes in some states but not in others. The CDC classifies the ESDM as an autism treatment, listing it among developmental approaches to treatment.
