= Son-Rise: A Miracle of Love =

- DVD cover
- Based on: Son-Rise by Barry Neil Kaufman
- Screenplay by: Barry Neil Kaufman; Samahria Lyte Kaufman; Stephen Kandel
- Directed by: Glenn Jordan
- Starring: James Farentino; Kathryn Harrold; Stephen Elliott; Michael & Casey Adams; Shelby Balik; Missy Francis; Kerry Sherman
- Narrated by: Barry Neil Kaufman
- Theme music composer: Gerald Fried
- Country of origin: United States
- Original language: English

Production
- Producer: Richard M. Rosenbloom
- Cinematography: Matthew F. Leonetti
- Editor: Sidney M. Katz
- Production company: Rothman/Wohl Productions

Original release
- Network: NBC
- Release: May 14, 1979

Son-Rise: A Miracle of Love is a televised docudrama film that aired on NBC in 1979 and is adapted from the nonfiction book Son-Rise by Barry Neil Kaufman. It is the real-life story of Raun Kaufman, whose parents claim fully recovered from autism, a lifelong and incurable developmental disability. The film was directed by Glenn Jordan, and the teleplay was written by Stephen Kandel, Samahria Lyte Kaufman, and Barry Neil Kaufman.

The film tells of Bears and Suzie Kaufman and their young son, Raun. By the time he was eighteen months old, Raun was diagnosed with autism—which, at the time, was classified as a form of childhood schizophrenia—and mental retardation. Accordingly, "although advised to institutionalize Raun, his parents...instead created an innovative home-based, child-centered program in an effort to reach [him]." Subsequently, Raun allegedly became neurotypical and earned his master's degree from Brown University. The film went on to receive the Humanitas Prize award.

The therapeutic, distraction play therapy progressed into a controversial teaching model called the Son-Rise program. By 1983, Bears and Samahria Kaufman founded The Option Institute and the Autism Treatment Center of America in Berkshire County, Massachusetts. Raun, his family and other staff members served on the board of directors. The Option Institute and the Autism Treatment Center of America were permanently shuttered in 2025 and 2026, respectively.

== Plot ==
Raun was born "like all, perfect" to Bears and Suzi Kaufman. Eventually, his parents noticed that Raun could only see certain things and sometimes hear. He also lost a couple of words that he had been taught. He had 12 out of 13 symptoms of autism. Medical professionals were pessimistic about Raun's condition.

The only options offered to the Kaufmans at the time were either institutionalization or a behavior modification program that employed aversives, such as spanking and electric shocks. His parents also witnessed young children being locked into cabinets by clinicians; other children had their hands tied to the back of chairs to suppress their hand-flapping, a self-stimulatory behavior common to autism.

The Kaufmans' decided to work with Raun, although he had not yet reached the age of two. They utilized their downstairs restroom, which was the only place free of distractions. When Raun flapped his hands and spun plates, so did Suzi, Bears, and his older sisters Bryn and Thea. After Suzi spun plates with Raun for several months, Raun looked directly at Suzi and smiled for the first time since Raun had begun displaying autistic traits. Other forms of contact Raun made included crying, when he was thirsty for juice or water. Raun's mother worked with him for a total of 70 to 80 hours a week, and his father sold his advertising agency to have more time to work with his son.

However, Raun relapsed into spinning plates without making contact, causing his parents to start all over until he made contact again. The Kaufmans' work was successful. At the end of the film, Raun was six years old and known as "a happy, active, bright, and loving normal boy."

== Production ==
Principal photography took place in California. Because of California child labor laws that prohibited children from working over three hours, twin brothers Michael and Casey Adams portrayed Raun.

The film was directed by Glenn Jordan, produced by Richard M. Rosenbloom, and executive produced by Bernard Rothman and Jack Wohl with the teleplay written by Stephen Kandel, Samahria Lyte Kaufman, and Barry Neil Kaufman. Throughout the film, singer Debby Boone sang the track "Is There Room in Your World for Me?"

== Cast ==
The cast that played the role of the Kaufman family are listed below.

- James Farentino as Bears Kaufman.
- Kathryn Harrold as Suzi Kaufman.
- Michael and Casey Adams as Raun Kaufman. Michael and Casey are twin brothers and are the great-grandsons of the well-known film director King Vidor.
- Shelby Balik as Bryn Kaufman.
- Missy Francis as Thea Kaufman.
- Kerry Sherman as Nancy, the family's nanny.

== Awards and nominations ==
In 1980, Samahria Lyte Kaufman, Barry Neil Kaufman, and Stephen Kandel earned a Humanitas Prize award in the 90-minute category.
