= Wendy Suzuki =

American neuroscientist

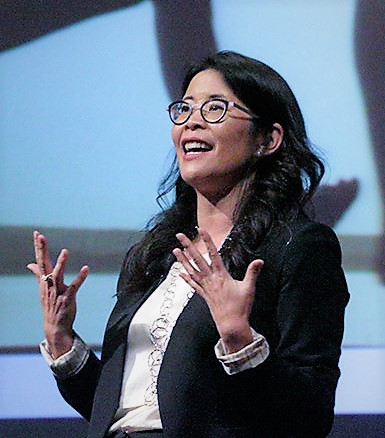
- Suzuki speaks at the National Institutes of Health in 2016
- Education: University of California, Berkeley (BA); University of California, San Diego (PhD)
- Awards: Troland Research Award
- Scientific career
- Fields: Neuroscience; Psychology
- Workplaces: National Institutes of Health; New York University
- Academic advisors: Marian Diamond; David Amaral
- Website: wendysuzuki.com

Wendy Suzuki is an American neuroscientist. She is a professor at the New York University Center for Neural Science. She is the author of Healthy Brain, Happy Life: A Personal Program to Activate Your Brain and Do Everything Better. Since September 1, 2022, she has served as Dean of the New York University College of Arts & Science.

== Education and early career ==
Suzuki received her bachelor's degree in physiology and human anatomy at the University of California, Berkeley in 1987. There, she worked with Marian Diamond, whom she met after taking her course called "The Brain and its Potential." Diamond's work opened the door into studying neuroplasticity with evidence that the brain could change in response to its environment. With an interest in memory and brain plasticity, Suzuki then went on to receive her Ph.D. in neuroscience from the University of California, San Diego in 1993 under the mentorship of David Amaral, Stuart Zola, and Larry Squire. There, her work uncovered the importance of the perirhinal and parahippocampal cortices in preserving our long-term memories. Her doctoral thesis won her the Society for Neuroscience's Donald B. Lindsley Prize in the field of behavioral neuroscience.

== Career and research ==
Suzuki completed postdoctoral research at the National Institutes of Health's National Institute of Mental Health between 1993 and 1998. There she worked under the mentorship of Robert Desimone, studying how the brain is able to remember where objects are in space.

Suzuki joined the faculty at New York University's Center for Neural Science in 1998. Her research interests center on neuroplasticity and how the brain is able to change and adapt over the course of a person's life. Her early career research focused on the areas of the brain that play an important role in our ability to form and retain memories. More recently, she's expanded this work to study the role of aerobic exercise on potentially enhancing cognitive abilities.

In March 2022, Suzuki was appointed as the Seryl Kushner Dean of NYU’s College of Arts & Science.

=== Memory and the brain ===
Suzuki's research career started with studying underlying memory. Her lab focused on the role of the hippocampus, which is the part of the brain that is responsible for memory of facts and events, otherwise known as declarative or explicit memory. Her research group was the first to identify major changes to patterns of neural activity in the hippocampus as subjects worked to form memories that associated objects with one another, known as "associative memories." They identified neural patterns associated with how the brain forms memories in a temporal order, showing the critical role of the hippocampus in how timing is incorporated into forming memories.

=== Exercise and the brain ===
Suzuki's research in 2018 focused on the impact of exercise on the brain. Her group is working to develop a "prescription" for the right amount of exercise to maximize brain activity for a range of purposes including; learning, aging, memory, attention, and mood. To support that work, the Suzuki lab is researching the kinds of exercise that enhance cognition among adults. Her group has found evidence that acute aerobic exercise can improve prefrontal cortex activity, which is the part of the brain that contributes to personality development. Suzuki is also investigating how best to incorporate exercise to treat mood and cognitive disorders. Her group has found that a combined regimen of exercise and self-affirmation interventions can enhance the cognitive capabilities and mood of patients with traumatic brain injury.

=== Science communication ===
Suzuki is also a popular science communicator and author of the book Healthy Brain, Happy Life. The book details her personal journey with exercise and how it has transformed her life, while discussing the underlying neuroscience of the benefits of exercise. Book promotional appearances included shows like CBS This Morning, WNYC, and the Big Think. Suzuki has appeared on HuffPost, sharing advances in her research on the link between exercise and brain activity.

Suzuki told a story for The Moth about how she first came to say "I love you" to her parents as an adult and for The Story Collider, about how an exercise in acting challenged her beliefs about love and attraction in the brain.

Other topics discussed were Keeping Fit During COVID-19, Physical Exercise and Brain Health

Suzuki is the author of the book Good Anxiety: Harnessing the Power of the Most Misunderstood Emotion. In it, she explains the potential benefits of feeling anxiety and encourages readers to strategically handle their anxious feelings. The book also draws on Suzuki's research and interest in neuroplasticity by describing the physiological processes in anxiety as something which can be shifted in response to stimuli. Though intended to help most people dealing with everyday stressors, Suzuki also notes that these techniques may not help readers with clinical anxiety.

=== Awards and honors ===
- New York University Golden Dozen Teaching Award, 2010
- National Academy of Sciences Troland Research Award, 2004
- McKnight Foundation Scholar Award, 1998 – 2000
- Donald B. Lindsley Prize, Society for Neuroscience, 1994

Suzuki also serves on the board of directors of the McKnight Foundation, acting as the chair for the Memory & Cognitive Disorder Awards.
