= Larry Squire =

American psychologist

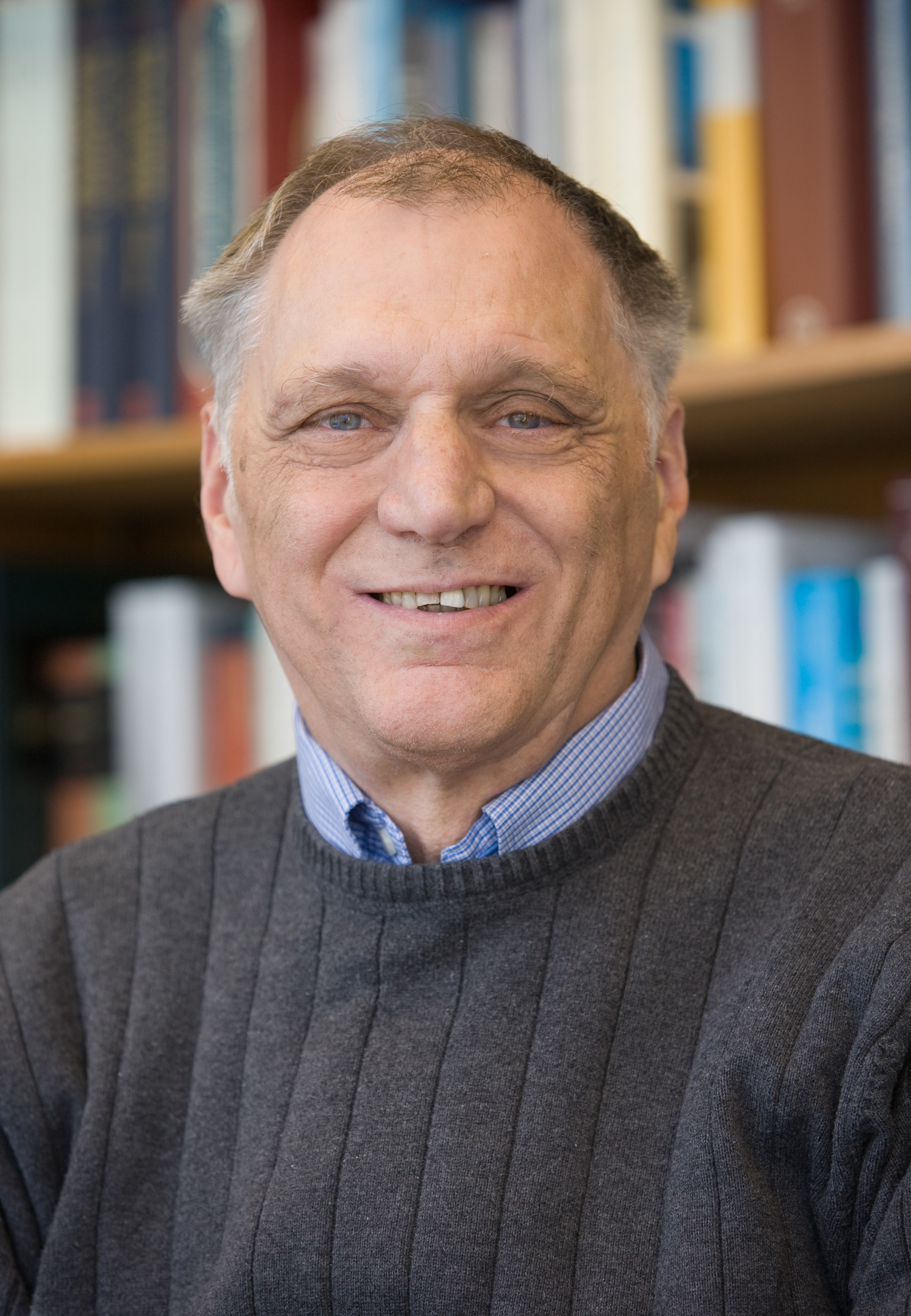
- Larry R. Squire in 2008
- Born: Larry Ryan Squire; May 4, 1941 (age 85)
- Education: Oberlin College (BA); Massachusetts Institute of Technology (PhD)
- Scientific career
- Workplaces: University of California, San Diego
- Doctoral advisor: Hans-Lukas Teuber
- Doctoral students: Wendy Suzuki
- Website: whoville.ucsd.edu/about.html

Larry Ryan Squire (born May 4, 1941) is an American neuroscientist. He is a professor of psychiatry, neurosciences, and psychology at the University of California, San Diego, and a Senior Research Career Scientist at the Veterans Affairs Medical Center, San Diego. He is an investigator of the neurological bases of memory, which he studies using animal models and human patients with memory impairment.

== Education ==
Squire received a B.A. from Oberlin College, where he studied with Celeste McCollough, and a Ph.D. from the Massachusetts Institute of Technology, where he studied under the mentorship of Peter Schiller and Hans-Lukas Teuber. He subsequently completed a postdoctoral fellowship at Albert Einstein College of Medicine.

== Career ==
Next Squire accepted a position as a faculty member at the University of California San Diego, where he has remained since. His publications include more than 480 research articles and two books: Memory and Brain (Oxford Press, 1987) and Memory: From Mind to Molecules with Eric Kandel (Roberts & Co., 2nd Ed, 2009). He is also senior editor of the textbook, Fundamental Neuroscience, now in its 4th Edition and editor-in-chief of The History of Neuroscience in Autobiography (now in eight volumes).

Larry Squire illuminated the anatomy and phenotype of human memory impairment, identified the anatomical components of the medial temporal lobe memory system (with Stuart Zola), pioneered the biological distinction between declarative and nondeclarative memory, explored the conscious and unconscious memory systems of the mammalian brain, and helped establish the standard account of memory consolidation.

== Honors and awards ==
In 1993–1994, Squire served as president of the Society for Neuroscience. He is an elected member of the National Academy of Sciences as of 1993, and served on the governing Council from 2009 to 2012. He has also been elected to the American Academy of Arts and Sciences, American Philosophical Society as of 1996, and National Academy of Medicine (formerly The Institute of Medicine) as of 2000.

He received the Charles A. Dana Award for Pioneering Achievements in Health in 1993, the Distinguished Scientific Contribution Award from the American Psychological Association in 1993, the William James Fellow of the Association for Psychological Science in 1994, the William Middleton Award from the United States Department of Veterans Affairs in 1994, the Metlife Foundation Award for Medical Research in Alzheimer's Disease in 1999, the Karl Spencer Lashley Award from the American Philosophical Society in 1995, "for his seminal contribution to the delineation of implicit and explicit memory systems in the brain", the McGovern Award from the American Association for the Advancement of Science in 2004, the Herbert Crosby Warren Medal from the Society of Experimental Psychologists in 2007, the Award for Scientific Reviewing from the National Academy of Sciences in 2012, and the Goldman-Rakic Prize from the Brain & Behavior Research Foundation in 2012.

He received an honorary degree from the University of Basel.

== Selected publications ==
- Memory and Brain New York; Oxford : Oxford University Press, 1987. XII, 315 p. ISBN 0-19-504208-5
- Memory: from Mind to Molecules, 2nd Edition, with Eric Kandel. Greenwood Village: Roberts & Co. ISBN 0981519415
- Fundamental Neuroscience. 4th ed. San Diego, CA : Academic Press, 2012. (Issued in 1998, 2003 and 2008.) 1426 p. avec CD ISBN 9780123858702
- Squire, L. R. (2009). "Memory and Brain Systems: 1969-2009." The Journal of Neuroscience, 29, 12711–12716.
- Wixted, J. T. & Squire, L. R. (2011). "The Medial Temporal Lobe and the Attributes of Memory." Trends in Cognitive Sciences, 15, 210–217.
- Squire, L. R. & Wixted, J. (2011). "The Cognitive Neuroscience of Human Memory since H.M.", Annual Review of Neuroscience, 34, 259–288.
- Insausti, R., Annese, J. Amaral, D. G., Squire, L. R. (2013). "Human Amnesia and the Medial Temporal Lobe Illuminated by Neuropsychological and Neurohistological Findings for Patient E.P.", Proceedings of the National Academy of Sciences, US, 110, E1953-E1962.
