= Gary B. Mesibov =

American psychologist, author and researcher

Dr. Gary B. Mesibov
- Education: Stanford University, University of Michigan, Brandeis University, University of North Carolina
- Occupations: Professor, psychologist, researcher, author, editor
- Notable work: Research and books on autism, Asperger syndrome, developmental disorders, TEACCH
- Board member of: Editorial boards: Journal of Pediatric Psychology and Journal of Clinical Child Psychology

Gary B. Mesibov is a licensed psychologist, psychology professor, editor and an author.

== Education ==
Mesibov received his Bachelor of Arts degree from Stanford University and his Master of Arts degree from the University of Michigan. He received his doctorate from Brandeis University and completed his postdoctoral fellowship at the University of North Carolina.

== Career ==
=== Professor and researcher ===
Mesibov was a professor of psychology at the University of North Carolina (UNC) at Chapel Hill for 35 years. All but 4 of those 35 years Mesibov was on the UNC Treatment and Education of Autistic and Related Communication Handicapped Children (TEACCH) faculty. From 1992 to 2012 he was the TEACCH director. TEACCH, founded by UNC psychiatry and psychology professor Eric Schopler, is a "pioneering" program for assisting with autism spectrum disorder education, research and service delivery for children and adults. As a result of his work, he is an "internationally recognized leader in autism research and practice."

By 1984, Mesibov noted pediatric psychologists worked frequently with developmental disorders in children. Specifically, children with "mental retardation, learning disabilities, cerebral palsy, autism, and related developmental problems. When not working directly with children, pediatric psychologists role included had a few other components. The demand and importance of parent training for children with developmental problems made it the subject of the Society of Pediatric Psychology (SPP) programming at the American Psychological Association (APA) convention for 1983. The collaboration with other professionals on site (e.g., speech and language therapists) provided education in outside domains and in working as a member of an interdisciplinary team. Furthermore, pediatric psychologists helped to create programs in the community addressing children's needs.

In a brief article following his reception of the 1990 Distinguished Service Award from the SPP, Mesibov reflected on three unique, or "special" characteristics he identified within the field of pediatric psychology. Specifically, he applauded the field's practical application to tackle difficult human needs, multidisciplinary approach, and character of pediatric psychologists he has worked with throughout his career.

=== Editor ===
By 1976, Mesibov was serving as Associate Editor and Don Routh began serving as Editor on the Journal of Pediatric Psychology (JPP). Common topics of the JPP included chronic pain and hyperactivity. He was an editorial board member for the Journal of Pediatric Psychology and the Journal of Clinical Child Psychology.

From 1997 to 2007, Mesibov served as Editor for the Journal of Autism and Developmental Disorders. The journal, which publishes 10 issues per year, is a scholarly journal that focuses on all aspects of autism spectrum disorders and related developmental disabilities.

== Publications ==
In the field of developmental disorders and autism spectrum disorders, Mesibov has published articles, books, editorials, research papers and contributed to published books.

- John W. Hagen; Gary Mesibov. Verbal Labeling and Serial Position Recall. University of Michigan, Center for Human Growth and Development; 1968
- Gary B. Mesibov. Attributions of Responsibility: A Cognitive Interpretation. Brandeis University; 1974
- Eric Schopler; Gary B. Mesibov. Psychoeducational Profile – Revised (PEP-R). Pro-Ed; January 1, 1979
- Eric Schopler; Gary B. Mesibov. Autism in Adolescents and Adults]. Springer; February 28, 1983.
- Eric Schopler; Gary B. Mesibov. (editors) Communication Problems in Autism. Springer; May 31, 1985
- Eric Schopler; Gary B. Mesibov. Social Behavior in Autism. Springer; February 28, 1986.
- Eric Schopler; Gary B. Mesibov. Neurobiological Issues in Autism. Springer; April 30, 1987
- Gary Mesibov; Eric Schopler. Adolescent and Adult Psychoeducational Profile (AAPEP). Pro-Ed; September 1, 1988.
- Eric Schopler; Gary B. Mesibov. Diagnosis and Assessment in Autism. Springer; September 30, 1988.
- Eric Schopler; Gary B. Mesibov. Behavioral Issues in Autism. Springer; March 31, 1994
- Eric Schopler; Gary B. Mesibov. Learning and cognition in autism. Plenum Press; 1995.
- Eric Schopler; Gary B. Mesibov. (editors). Parent Survival Manual: A Guide to Crisis Resolution in Autism and Related Developmental Disorders. Springer; June 30, 1995
- Rhoda I. Landrus; Gary B. Mesibov. Structured Teaching. Division TEACCH; 1996
- Gary B. Mesibov; Lynn W. Adams; Laura G. Klinger. Autism: Understanding the Disorder. Springer; January 31, 1998.
- Eric Schopler; Gary B. Mesibov; Linda J. Kunce. Asperger Syndrome or High-Functioning Autism?. Springer; April 30, 1998
- Gary B. Mesibov; Victoria Shea; Lynn W. Adams. Understanding Asperger Syndrome and High Functioning Autism. Springer; August 31, 2001.
- Gary Mesibov. Accessing the Curriculum for Pupils with Autistic Spectrum Disorders: Using the TEACCH Programme to Help Inclusion. Taylor & Francis; June 20, 2003
- Gary B. Mesibov; Victoria Shea; Eric Schopler. The TEACCH Approach to Autism Spectrum Disorders. Springer; December 7, 2004.
- Gary Mesibov. AAPEP. PRO-ED; 2007
- Gary Mesibov; John B. Thomas; Michael Chapman. Teacch Transition Assessment Profile (TTAP). Pro Ed; December 31, 2007
- Ruth Aspy; Barry G. Grossman; Gary B. Mesibov, PhD (FRW). Designing Comprehensive Interventions for High-Functioning Individuals with Autism Spectrum Disorders: The Ziggurat Model. Autism Asperger Publishing Company; August 31, 2011
- Gary Mesibov; John B. Thomas; Michael Chapman. Teacch Transition Assessment Profile, Computer Version (Ttap-cv): Computer Version. Pro Ed; March 30, 2012

== Awards ==
For his work, Mesibov has received numerous awards within the United States and internationally, including:

- Honorary Doctorate from The University of North Hampton (UK)
- Autism Society of America's Founders Award
- 2013 Schopler Lifetime Achievement Award (UNC)
