= Leonard Abbeduto =

American psychologist

- Citizenship: United States of America
- Occupations: Tsakopoulos-Vismara Endowed Chair of Psychiatry and Behavioral Sciences
- Awards: Enid and William Rosen Research Award Kellett Mid-Career Research Award Emil H. Steiger Distinguished Teaching Award

Academic background
- Education: University of Illinois at Chicago

Academic work
- Discipline: Psychology
- Institutions: MIND Institute, University of California, Davis

Leonard Abbeduto is a psychologist known for his research on individuals with neurodevelopmental disorders, including Fragile X syndrome, autism spectrum disorder, and Down syndrome, and factors that influence their linguistic development over the lifespan. He is the Tsakopoulos-Vismara Endowed Chair of Psychiatry and Behavioral Sciences at University of California, Davis. He serves as director of research at the Medical Investigation of Neurodevelopment Disorders (MIND) Institute, which was launched in 2001. Prior to his affiliation with the University of California, Davis, Abbeduto was the associate director for Behavioral Sciences at the Waisman Center at the University of Wisconsin-Madison.

Abbeduto received various awards during his tenure at the University of Wisconsin-Madison including the Kellett Mid-Career Research Award and the Emil A. Steiger Award for Distinguished Teaching. In 2010, Abbeduto received the Enid and William Rosen Research Award from the National Fragile X Foundation.

Abbeduto has authored several books including Taking Sides: Clashing Views in Educational Psychology and Guide to Human Development for Future Educators. He co-authored Language and Communication in Mental Retardation: Development, Processes and Intervention, with Sheldon Rosenberg. A review, published by the Linguistic Society of America, acknowledges the complexity of research on language development in individuals with neurodevelopmental disorders and describes the book as valuable and useful to the field.

== Biography ==
Abbeduto received his Bachelor of Science in psychology from the University of Illinois at Chicago in 1975. He also completed both his Master of Arts (1979) and his Ph.D. (1982) in Psychology from the University of Illinois at Chicago. Abbeduto's dissertation was titled Syntactic and semantic influences on the motor programming of speech: Developmental differences and similarities.

Earlier in his career, Abbeduto served as Chair of the Department of Educational Psychology at the University of Wisconsin-Madison. Abbeduto's research has been funded by the National Institutes of Health since 1985, including more than $3 million awarded to the MIND institute in 2013 by the National Institute on Child Health and Human Development to support research on Fragile X syndrome and Down syndrome. These awards have allowed Abbeduto to conduct research using expressive language sampling to gain information on the linguistic development of individuals with neurodevelopmental disorders.

Abbeduto is Editor of the American Journal of Intellectual and Developmental Disabilities.

== Research ==
Abbeduto is known for his research on behavioral, cognitive, and linguistic development of individuals with neurodevelopmental disorders and intellectual disabilities. Abbeduto's early research focused on children's developing knowledge about the presuppositions of cognitive verbs, including factives and nonfactives, which indicated that some cognitive verbs were not mastered until after age 7. In other early research, Abbeduto examined the conversational skills of adults with mild intellectual disability, focusing on the use of grammatical morphemes and complex sentence constructions as measures of language competence. His research indicated positive trajectories in the linguistic development of individuals with intellectually disabilities.

Still early in his career, Abbeduto began researching the communicative and linguistic impairments associated with Fragile X syndrome and the potential opportunities for intervention with this population. He has contributed to research on Fragile X syndrome, not only by focusing on communication and language development, but also by studying the development of social avoidance through longitudinal studies. Abbeduto and his colleagues discovered that social avoidance, which is common in individuals with Fragile X syndrome, increases during childhood but then levels off during adulthood.

Abbeduto found that there are important clinical differences between autism and Fragile X syndrome, which have implications for treatment. Abbeduto's research at University of California, Davis focuses on building interventions for children and teens with Fragile X syndrome. These interventions include both behavioral and pharmacological treatment components and target specific language skills, including narrative abilities.

Abbeduto's research also involves studies of language impairments associated with Down syndrome, with some of his research findings suggesting that individuals with Down syndrome produce fewer verbs than comparison groups.

== Representative publications ==
- Abbeduto, L.; Murphy, M. M.; Cawthon, S. W.; Richmond, E. K.; Weissman, M. D.; Karadottir, S.; O'Brien, A. (2003). "Receptive language skills of adolescents and young adults with Down or fragile X syndrome". American Journal on Mental Retardation. 108 (3): 149–160. doi:10.1352/0895-8017(2003)108<0149:rlsoaa>2.0.co;2. PMID 12691594.
- Abbeduto, L.; Rosenberg, S. (1985). "Children's knowledge of the presuppositions of know and other cognitive verbs". Journal of Child Language. 12 (3): 621–641. doi:10.1017/s0305000900006693. PMID 4077935. S2CID 40303750.
- Abbeduto, L.; Seltzer, M. M.; Shattuck, P.; Krauss, M. W.; Orsmond, G.; Murphy, M. M. (2004). "Psychological well-being and coping in mothers of youths with autism, Down syndrome, or Fragile X syndrome". American Journal on Mental Retardation. 109 (3): 237–254. doi:10.1352/0895-8017(2004)109<237:pwacim>2.0.co;2. PMID 15072518.
