= The Heart Principle =

2021 romance novel by Helen Hoang

- The first edition paperback cover for The Heart Principle by Helen Hoang
- Author: Helen Hoang
- Language: English
- Series: The Kiss Quotient
- Genre: Romance
- Published: August 31, 2021
- Publisher: Berkley Books
- Publication place: United States
- Pages: 352
- Award: Goodreads Choice Award Nominee for Romance (2021)
- ISBN: 978-0-451-49084-1
- Preceded by: The Bride Test

The Heart Principle is a 2021 romance novel written by Helen Hoang.

== Plot ==
A professional violinist, Anna Sun, learns that her boyfriend Julian wants an open relationship. Anna then creates a profile on a dating app and meets Quan Diep, a CEO of a clothing company she ends up having an affair with.

== Critical reception ==
Kirkus Reviews said in its review, "Genre readers will have to judge for themselves if the romance plot satisfies, but those desperate for fiction that explores the crushing weight of caregiving will find it here."
