= Sally J. Rogers =

American psychologist and professor

- Education: Ohio State University, Ashland University, Colby College
- Known for: Autism & Early Start Denver Model
- Scientific career
- Fields: Behavioral scientist, Autism
- Workplaces: University of California, Davis
- Website: http://www.ucdmc.ucdavis.edu/mindinstitute/ourteam/faculty/rogers.html

Sally J. Rogers is a professor affiliated with the MIND Institute and the Department of Psychiatry and Behavioral Sciences at the University of California, Davis. She is a scientist whose work is focused on the early diagnosis and treatment of autism and other neurodevelopmental disorders. She is a pioneer in the field of autism treatment and co-developed the Early Start Denver Model (ESDM). She has published nearly 200 papers on the early diagnosis and treatment of autism.

== Early life ==
Rogers was born in Akron, Ohio, in 1948.

== Education ==
Rogers attended Colby College in Waterville, Maine from 1965 to 1967 and Ashland College in Ashland, Ohio, where she earned her Bachelor of Arts in June 1969. Rogers then attended The Ohio State University in Columbus, Ohio to study developmental psychology, earning her Master of Arts in June 1973 and her Doctor of Philosophy in March 1975. During this time, Rogers completed an internship in psychological assessment and treatment from September 1972 to August 1973 at Orient State Institute in Orient, Ohio. Rogers was supervised by Henry Leland.

== Research and career ==
Rogers acted as staff psychologist and acting director in the psychology department at Orient State Institute from September 1973 to May 1974.

In the 1980s, Rogers began working on the ESDM alongside clinical psychologist and autism researcher Geraldine Dawson. The ESDM is a form of applied behavior analysis, a behaviorist intervention commonly marketed as an autism treatment that has been criticized by some autistic individuals and autism scholars.

In 2022, Rogers received the Lifetime Achievement Award from the International Society for Autism Research.
