= The Bride Test =

2019 romance novel by Helen Hoang

- Author: Helen Hoang
- Language: English
- Series: The Kiss Quotient
- Genre: Romance
- Publisher: Berkley Books
- Publication date: 2019
- Publication place: United States
- ISBN: 978-0-451-49082-7
- Preceded by: The Kiss Quotient
- Followed by: The Heart Principle

The Bride Test is a 2019 romance novel written by Helen Hoang.

A companion novel to The Kiss Quotient, The Bride Test follows Esme Tran, a resourceful young Vietnamese woman working as a hotel maid in Ho Chi Minh City. Her life takes an unexpected turn when she's approached by a wealthy Vietnamese-American woman who offers her a unique opportunity: travel to the United States for the summer to live with her son, Khai Diep, and explore the possibility of marriage.

Khai, the autistic cousin of Michael (the male lead from The Kiss Quotient), is emotionally guarded and convinced he’s incapable of love. As Esme integrates into his world—navigating cultural expectations, American norms, and her own insecurities—she begins to challenge both his assumptions and her own.

Hoang has said she wanted to subvert harmful tropes surrounding autism by writing an autistic character—protagonist Khai—who is perceived by others as cold and heartless, when this is not actually the case. The book was also inspired by her mother's immigrant story, with Esme's journey drawn directly from conversations about what it was like to grow up poor in Vietnam and to immigrate to the US. Hoang describes The Bride Test as "Green Card meets Four Weddings and a Funeral—but with autism."

The Bride Test received positive reviews from Publishers Weekly and Kirkus Reviews.

== See also ==
- The Heart Principle
