= Jennifer Cook =

American writer (born 1975)

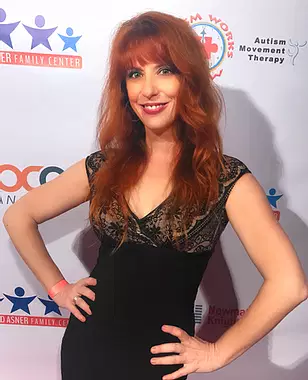
- Cook at a Ed Asner Family Center event, 2018
- Born: Jennifer Lynn Cook; October 24, 1975 (age 51); Glen Ridge, New Jersey, U.S.
- Education: Brown University; Columbia University
- Occupations: Author; speaker
- Spouse(s): John O'Toole (m. 2001; div. 2018) Brett Banks (m. 2019)
- Children: 3
- Writing career
- Language: English
- Subject: Autism
- Notable works: Asperkids book series; Autism in Heels

Jennifer Lynn Cook (née: Cook O'Toole; born October 24, 1975) is an American author and speaker. She is known for her six Asperkids books, which have been translated into six languages and include the winner of the Autism Society of America's Book of the Year Award. Her memoir, Autism in Heels, is a Wall Street Journal Bestseller, and a "Best Book" title winner by Publishers Weekly. She is the on-camera autism expert in Netflix's series Love on the Spectrum.

Cook was diagnosed with the now-defunct autism subtype Asperger syndrome in 2011; all three of her children were also diagnosed with the condition. In 2019, she became the inaugural senior directorial consultant for the Jefferson Health Center for Autism and Neurodiversity in Philadelphia, and was selected to address the United States' National Institutes of Health Interagency Autism Coordinating Committee regarding the unique issues surrounding women, girls, and autism. Cook advised the President's Council on Disabilities and President's Council on Sports, Fitness, and Nutrition at the White House in 2015, and, as an advisor to the Sesame Workshop, has a voice in the development of Julia, the first autistic character on Sesame Street and their "See the Amazing in Every Child" initiative.

She is a featured contributor in Tony Attwood's Top Aspie Mentors: Been There, Done That and Autism & Learning Differences, and wrote the forewords to Dragonfly: A Daughter's Emergence from Autism: A Practical Guide for Parents and Easy to Love, Hard to Live With. Cook sits on the Autism Society of America's Council of Autistic Advisors, is a columnist/expert panelist for Amy Poehler's Smart Girls, Autism Asperger's Digest, Zoom Autism magazine, AuKids magazine, Special magazine and the Journal for the North American Montessori Teachers' Association NAMTA, and is a commentator on NPR's WHYY and WFAE, as well as Fox's WTXF-TV and NBC's Charlotte Today.

== Background ==
Cook was born in Glen Ridge, New Jersey, and grew up in West Caldwell. She is the only child of Joseph (d. 2007) and Jane Cook. Her father was an international commercial litigator. Her mother served as the only woman on their town council for 12 years.

Cook began dancing at age two, continuing through college. Cook attended Brown University, where she was a member of Kappa Alpha Theta. She majored in American Civilization, graduating with high honors in 1997. She was hired as a counselor in the Domestic Violence Unit of the Charlotte-Mecklenburg Police Department in Charlotte, North Carolina. In this capacity, she trained officers, led student-focused presentations in colleges and high schools, and served as a victim advocate. In 1999, Cook began Master's work at the Graduate School of Social Work at Columbia University in New York City. After Columbia, she enrolled at the Graduate School of Education at Queens University of Charlotte, while teaching language arts at both the middle school and high school levels. In her first term, she garnered a student-initiated nomination for Disney's American Teacher of the Year Award.

== Personal life ==
Cook was married to John O'Toole from 2001 to 2018, with whom she has three children. She married her second husband, Brett Banks, in 2019. Cook and her family live near Charlotte, North Carolina. In addition to being autistic, she has synesthesia.

== Bibliography ==
=== Asperkids series ===
- Asperkids: An Insider's Guide to Loving, Understanding and Teaching Children with Asperger Syndrome
  (2012, Jessica Kingsley Publishers) ISBN 978-1849059022
- The Asperkids' (Secret) Book of Social Rules: The Handbook of Not-So- Obvious Guidelines for Teens and Tweens
  (2012, Jessica Kingsley Publishers) ISBN 978-1849059152
- The Asperkid's Launch Pad: Home Design That Empowers Everyday Superheroes
  (2013, Jessica Kingsley Publishers) ISBN 978-1849059312
- The Asperkid's Not-Your-Average-Coloring Book
  (2013, Jessica Kingsley Publishers) ISBN 978-1849059589
- The Asperkid's Game Plan: Purposeful Play, Extraordinary Minds.... Ordinary Stuff
  (2014, Jessica Kingsley Publishers) ISBN 978-1849059596

=== Other books ===
- Sisterhood of the Spectrum: An Asperger Chick's Guide to Life
  (2015, Jessica Kingsley Publishers) ISBN 978-1849057905
- Autism in Heels: The Untold Story of a Female Life on the Spectrum
  (2018, Skyhorse Publishers) ASIN B073X64DSV
- My Friend Julia: A Sesame Street Book about Autism
  (2023, Lerner Publishers) ASIN B0BP7S1FS9

=== Contributions ===
- Foreword for Dragonfly: A Daughter's Emergence from Autism: A Practical Guide for Parents by Lori Ashley Taylor
  (2018, Skyhorse Publishers)
- Foreword for Easy to Love but Hard to Live With: Real People, Invisible Disabilities, True Stories edited by Lisa Davis
  (2014, DRT Press) ISBN 978-1933084046
- Featured 'World's Top Aspie Mentors' contributor for Been There. Done That. Try This!: An Aspie's Guide to Life on Earth edited by Tony Attwood
  (2014, Jessica Kingsley Publishers) ISBN 978-1849059640
- Featured contributor for Autism and Learning Differences: An Active Learning, Teaching Toolkit by Michael P. MacMannon, with a foreword by Stephen Shore
  (2015, Jessica Kingsley Publishers) ISBN 978-1849057943

=== Podcast ===
- Speaking Geek: Translating Typical for the Human Spectrum

== Awards and honors ==
- Publishers Weekly: Best Books List
- Booklist Book of Distinction Starred Review by the American Library Association
- 24 Amazing Feminist Books of 2018, Book Riot, 2018
- Outstanding Literary Work of the Year, Autism Society of America, 2014
- 50 Most Influential Women in North Carolina, 2014
- 25 Most Amazing Autistic Women, Autistic Spectrum Digest, August 2014
- Temple Grandin Award for Outstanding Global Contributions, Future Horizons
- Women Inspiring Strength & Hope Award, Make-A-Wish
- GRASP Excellence in Parenting/Distinguished Spectrumite
- AuKids Speaker of the Year
- Leading Woman, The Kappa Alpha Theta Leading Women Award (2013)
- Disney's Babble: Top 30 Autism Spectrum Blogs 2013
- Disney's Babble: Top 30 Autism Facebook Fan Pages 2013
- Disney's Babble: Top 30 Autism Websites
- Godiva's Woman of the Year, Nominee
