= Topics in Early Childhood Special Education =

- Discipline: Education, special education
- Language: English
- Edited by: Erin E. Barton

Publication details
- History: 1981–present
- Publisher: SAGE Publications
- Frequency: Quarterly
- Impact factor: 1.125 (2017)

Standard abbreviations
- ISO 4: Top. Early Child. Spec. Educ.

Indexing
- ISSN: 0271-1214 (print); 1538-4845 (web)
- LCCN: 84641086
- OCLC no.: 48841098

Links
- Journal homepage; Online access; Online archive

Topics in Early Childhood Special Education is a peer-reviewed academic journal that publishes papers in the field of Education. The journal's editor is Erin E. Barton (Vanderbilt University). It has been in publication since 1981 and is currently published by SAGE Publications in association with Hammill Institute on Disabilities.

== Scope ==
Topics in Early Childhood Special Education focuses on information that aims to improve the lives of young children with special needs and their families. The journal contains reports of original research, literature reviews and conceptual statements. Topics in Early Childhood Special Education primarily aims to help professionals improve service delivery systems for preschool children with special needs.

== Abstracting and indexing ==
Topics in Early Childhood Special Education is abstracted and indexed in, among other databases, SCOPUS and the Social Sciences Citation Index. According to the Journal Citation Reports, its 2017 impact factor is 1.125, ranking it 25 out of 40 journals in the category ‘Education, Special’.
