= Helen Hoang =

American novelist (born 1982)

- Born: 1982 (age 43–44); Minneapolis, Minnesota, U.S.
- Occupation: Novelist
- Children: 2
- Writing career
- Language: English
- Years active: 2018–present
- Genre: Romance fiction
- Notable work: The Kiss Quotient series
- Website: helenhoang.com

Helen Hoang (born 1982) is the pen name of an American romance novelist, best known for her best-selling debut novel The Kiss Quotient.

== Career ==
Prior to being published, Hoang wrote paranormal and fantasy romances with a martial arts bent. She states that she wrote on and off for around ten years before The Kiss Quotient was published. Hoang says that the writers who influence her own work the most are Jayne Ann Krentz, Christine Feehan, Nalini Singh, Elizabeth Lowell, Susan Elizabeth Phillips, Kresley Cole, Eloisa James, Julia Quinn, and Lisa Kleypas.

Hoang's first novel, The Kiss Quotient, was published in June 2018. The romance novel follows Stella, an autistic woman who hires an escort in order to explore intimacy with other people. Hoang states that she initially wanted to write a gender-swapped Pretty Woman, but was stuck when examining why a "successful, beautiful woman would hire an escort." Later, her realization that she and her daughter are both on the autism spectrum led to the basis for the book.

A sequel titled The Bride Test, about Esme, a hotel maid who gets offered to accompany Khai, the autistic cousin of Michael from the first book who never had a girlfriend before to weddings, was published by Berkley in May 2019. Hoang says that she wanted to subvert the harmful tropes surrounding autism by writing an autistic character through protagonist Khai who is perceived by others as cold and heartless when this is not actually the case. The book was inspired by her mother's immigrant story, with Esme's story coming directly from conversations with her mom about what it was like to be poor in Vietnam and what it was like when she first came to the U.S. Hoang describes The Bride Test as "Green Card meets Four Weddings and a Funeral—but with autism." The Bride Test received positive reviews from Publishers Weekly and Kirkus Reviews.

Hoang's third book in the series, The Heart Principle, was published in 2021. Hoang describes it as "a cross between a gender-swapped Sabrina and Say Anything."

== Personal life ==
Hoang was raised in Minnesota before moving to California. Her mother is a Vietnamese immigrant.

Growing up, Hoang struggled with social anxiety, which led to her turning to romance novels as an outlet that guaranteed a happy ending. During a meeting with her daughter's preschool teacher, Hoang found out that her daughter is on the autism spectrum. She researched autism and realized that she, too, is autistic. This influenced the development of The Kiss Quotient and her subsequent books.

She received an undergraduate business degree and worked in finance after college prior to becoming an author.

Hoang lives in San Diego with her husband and two children.

== Bibliography ==
Title	Series	Publication year	ISBN
The Kiss Quotient	The Kiss Quotient #1	2018	9780451490803
The Bride Test	The Kiss Quotient #2	2019	9780451490827
The Heart Principle	The Kiss Quotient #3	2021	9780451490841

== Awards and reception ==
- 2018 - New York Public Library Best Books of 2018 – The Kiss Quotient
