= Son-Rise =

Home-based program for autistic children

Son-Rise is a home-based therapeutic program for autistic and other developmentally disabled people. It was developed by former advertising executive Barry Neil Kaufman and his wife, Samahria Lyte Kaufman, for their son, Raun, who was diagnosed with autism and who they claimed fully recovered from the incurable and lifelong condition. In 2010, the program was described by Autism Speaks as a "child-centered program that places parents as the key therapists and directors of their program". Son-Rise has been criticized by some mainstream researchers for the high cost of in-person instructional courses and a lack of independent studies verifying its efficacy.

== In-person instruction and methodology ==
Until its shutdown in 2026, parents were trained at the Kaufman's Autism Treatment Center of America, the division of The Option Institute in Sheffield, Massachusetts that taught The Son-Rise Program. There, the Kaufman family and their fellow staff members taught families and professionals to be aware of their attitudes—a core principle of the therapy—to foster bonding and relationship-building, as well as to create a low-stimulus, distraction-free playroom so the autistic subject could feel secure and in control of overstimulation. Parents and facilitators imitated an autistic person's exclusive and restricted stimming behavior until the autistic person showed social cues for willing engagement. Then encouragement for more complex social activities was done in a non-coercive way. If the autistic person withdrew from social interaction, the facilitator gave them space and used parallel play to build trust. To encourage skill acquisition, the program used the autistic person's particular motivation for learning. The program's developers claimed that, if the parents learned to accept their loved ones without judgement, said loved ones could teach themselves to interact with others.

While the Autism Center of America was in operation, some parents or caregivers would spend up to tens of thousands of dollars on in-person Son-Rise instructional courses, including those that would certify them to mentor others. While some attendees were granted scholarships, others paid full price, with some resorting to crowdfunding. In 2017, psychologist Catherine Lord remarked to Slate, "Should you be selling your house to pay for this extraordinarily expensive program? ... That's where we are getting worried." At that time, The Option Institute claimed to have instructed more than 30,000 families from over 120 countries.

== Son-Rise: The Miracle Continues ==
Son-Rise: The Miracle Continues

Son-Rise: The Miracle Continues is a biographical book by Barry Neil Kaufman published in 1994. It was revised and expanded from the original book, Son-Rise, which was adapted into the NBC television movie Son-Rise: A Miracle of Love, securing the Humanitas Prize award in the 90-minute category.

Kaufman tells of the excursion that he and his wife, Samahria, take to fully recover their eighteen-month-old son from severe autism and profound intellectual disability. Diagnosticians told the Kaufmans that their son, Raun, was hopelessly incurable and that he should live in a lifelong facility.

== History ==
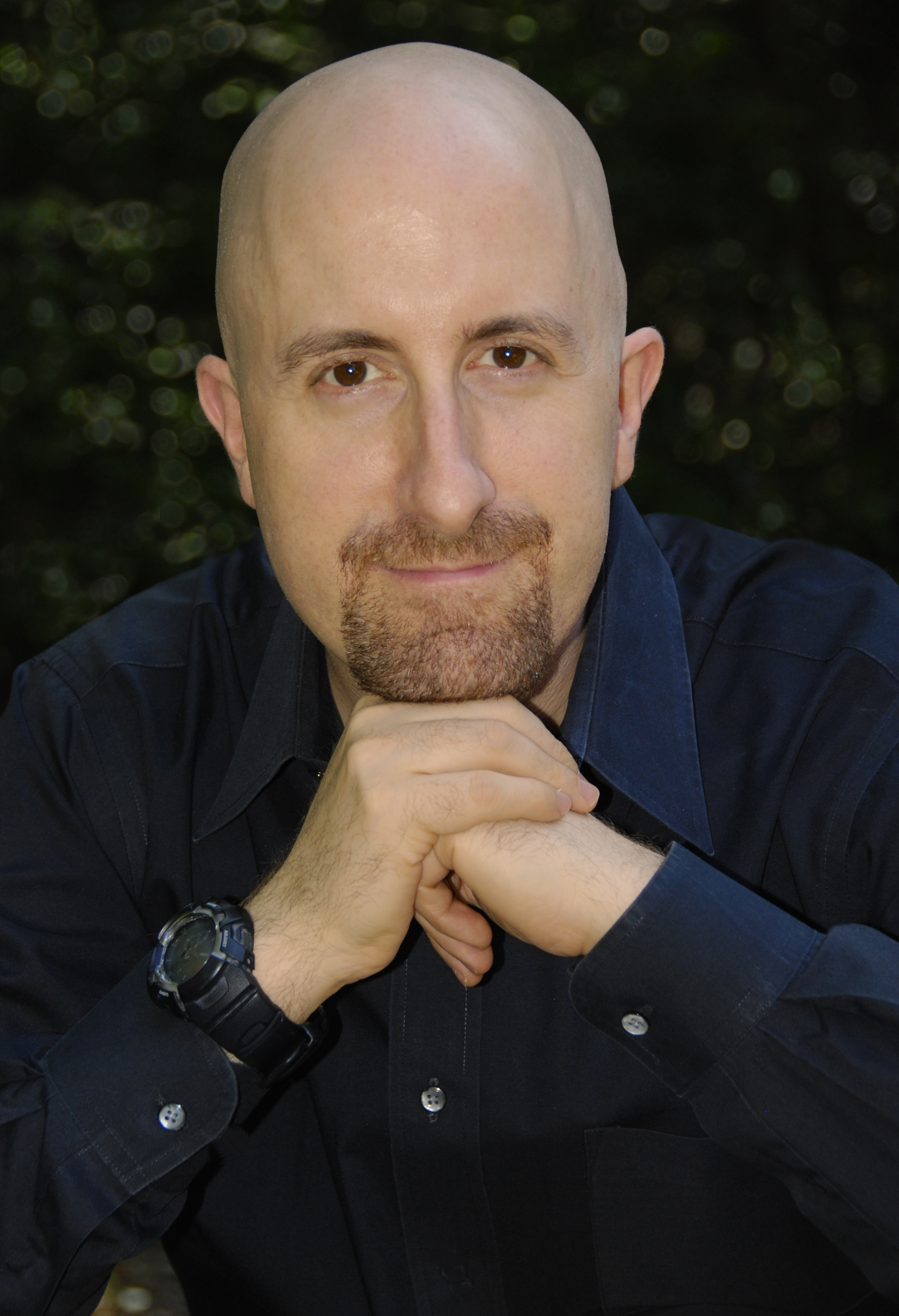
Raun Kaufman

In the 1970s, Barry and Samahria Kaufman created the treatment modality for their son, Raun, who had been diagnosed with autism. However, it remains unclear if Raun Kaufman had ever been autistic. Among the five clinics that evaluated the boy in New York State—each describing him as "socially withdrawn and uncommunicative"—it was only the sixth clinic that felt he was autistic.

In 1976, Barry Neil Kaufman authored Son-Rise, a book recounting his son's claimed recovery, which he revised in 1994 under the title Son-Rise: The Miracle Continues. The book was adapted into a televised docudrama film, called Son-Rise: A Miracle of Love, which aired on NBC in 1979.

A 1997 BBC documentary followed the family of a five-year-old autistic boy treated by the program.

As of 2014, Raun Kaufman was the director of global education for the Autism Treatment Center of America. In early 2026, the board of directors overseeing the center announced that it was shutting down. They stated on the center's official website, "Despite meaningful work and sincere attempts to adapt our programs, the organization was ultimately unable to achieve the level of sustainability required for long-term operation." This followed the shutdown of The Option Institute in December 2025.

== Effectiveness ==
There are no documented normalizations with older children, and it may be that success "depends on a certain level of intellectual potential". Some professionals have questioned the emphasis placed on eye contact and its potential problems for some children. The consensus within the medical community is that there is no cure for autism, and only a very few treatments have empirical evidence for improvements in symptoms. A 2003 study conducted in collaboration with The Option Institute found that involvement with The Son-Rise Program led to more drawbacks than benefits for the involved families over time, although family stress levels did not rise in all cases. A 2006 study conducted in collaboration with The Option Institute found that The Son-Rise Program is not always implemented as it is typically described in the literature, which suggests it will be difficult to evaluate its efficacy. In 2013, psychologist Kat Houghton and colleagues released the results of a small-scale study they claimed preliminarily supported the efficacy of Son-Rise and justified additional research; however, they did not disclose that they had received $16,500 in funding from The Option Institute.

In 2009, the United Kingdom’s Advertising Standards Authority sanctioned The Option Institute for a misleading ad claiming Son-Rise as an autism cure. As of 2017, there was little independent evidence supporting the program; psychiatrist Fred R. Volkmar told Slate at that time, "I'm not aware of any rigorous scientific evidence that supports it."
