= American Association on Intellectual and Developmental Disabilities =

American non-profit organization

- Abbreviation: AAIDD
- Founded: 1876
- Tax ID no.: 06-0636098
- Legal status: 501(c)(3)
- Purpose: To promote progressive policies, sound research, effective practices, and universal human rights for people with intellectual and developmental disabilities.
- Location: Silver Spring, Maryland, United States
- President: Anthony Rodriguez
- Executive Director: Margaret Nygren
- Revenue: $4,219,682 (2023)
- Expenses: $3,739,078 (2023)
- Employees: 15 (2023)
- Volunteers: 20 (2023)
- Website: www.aaidd.org
- Formerly called: Association of Medical Officers of American Institutions for Idiotic and Feebleminded Persons, American Association for the Study of the Feebleminded, American Association on Mental Deficiency, American Association on Mental Retardation

The American Association on Intellectual and Developmental Disabilities (AAIDD) is an American non-profit organization focusing on intellectual disability and related developmental disabilities. AAIDD has members in the United States and more than 50 other countries.

== History ==
The AAIDD was founded in 1876 by Édouard Séguin, and is the oldest professional association concerned with intellectual and developmental disabilities. It is headquartered in Silver Spring, Maryland, a suburb of Washington, D.C.

The name of the association has changed five times in its history, reflecting the changes in thinking about the condition known today as intellectual disability:

- 1876: Association of Medical Officers of American Institutions for Idiotic and Feebleminded Persons
- 1906: American Association for the Study of the Feebleminded
- 1933: American Association on Mental Deficiency
- 1987: American Association on Mental Retardation
- 2007: American Association on Intellectual and Developmental Disabilities

== Mission and goals ==
The AAIDD's stated mission is to promote progressive policies, sound research, effective practices, and universal human rights for people with intellectual and developmental disabilities.

The association's goals are to:

1. Enhance the capacity of professionals who work with individuals with intellectual and developmental disabilities.
2. Promote the development of a society that fully includes individuals with intellectual and developmental disabilities.
3. Sustain an effective, responsive, well managed, and responsibly-governed organization.

It also has various sub-groups with more specific interests, such as the Religion and Spirituality Interest Network, "an interfaith, interdisciplinary association of professional ordained and lay people who journey with persons with developmental disabilities and their families."

== Understanding intellectual disability ==
The organization's most well-known publication is its definitional and diagnostic manual, first published in 1910 and now in its 12th edition: Intellectual Disability: Definition, Diagnosis, Classification, and Systems of Support.

Researchers and clinicians affiliated with AAIDD provided input to the development of the World Health Organization's (WHO) International Classification of Diseases, 11th Revision (ICD-11) behavioral indicators that could be used to guide clinical judgement in determining the presence and severity of deficits in intellectual functioning and adaptive behavior for the purpose of making a diagnosis of disorders of intellectual development when standardized assessments are not available or feasible. When field tested by the WHO, the behavioral indicators were found to have good clinical utility and excellent inter-rater reliability.

== Publications ==
The AAIDD publishes books, evidenced-based assessment tools, and three peer-reviewed journals.

=== Journals ===
The AAIDD encourages a diversity of contributions from different traditions of inquiry and disciplines; all papers must meet the journals' criteria for rigor and peer review to be considered for publication.

- Established in 1896, American Journal on Intellectual and Developmental Disabilities (AJIDD) is a multidisciplinary journal for reporting original contributions of the highest quality on intellectual disability, its causes, treatment, and prevention. Like its parent organization, the journal has had multiple names through its history. It began as simply the journal of the proceedings and addresses from the association's annual conference, published under the corresponding name of the association. In 1939, it expanded beyond the annual conference report and became known as American Journal of Mental Deficiency. From 1987 until 2007, it was titled the American Journal of Mental Retardation, after which it was given its current title. It is focused primarily on scientific and medical studies and reviews.
- Established in 1963, Intellectual and Developmental Disabilities (IDD) is a journal of current policy, best practices, and new perspectives on intellectual and developmental disabilities. IDD provides a forum for the dissemination of rigorously reviewed, actionable information and transformative concepts, with a focus on praxis over theory.
- Established in 2013, Inclusion is a multidisciplinary journal that provides a forum for the presentation and discussion of evidence-based interventions and strategies that promote the full inclusion of those with intellectual and developmental disabilities in society at large.

=== Books and assessment tools ===
The AAIDD publishes essential books and tools for professionals and others in the field of intellectual and developmental disabilities.

It also publishes Supports Intensity Scales (SIS), a group of assessment tools that evaluate the practical support requirements of people with intellectual disabilities. It is available in a child version (SIS-C) and an adult version (SIS-A, 2nd ed.). Both versions assess someone's needed level of support, but adjust for differences in age-related expectations. The assessment is done through semi-structured interviews with those who can give insight to the daily life of the person being assessed, up to and including the person themselves when appropriate. The SIS measures support needs in multiple areas of daily life, including standardized subscales in home living, community living, health and safety, learning, work, advocacy, and social activities and additional scales addressing exceptional medical and behavioral support needs. Assessors rate different categories according to the frequency, amount, and type of support that a person requires. The individual's overall Supports Intensity Profile is generated based on their subscale Standard Scores, which are indexed and percentile ranked.

== Education ==
As the oldest professional organization in the field of intellectual and developmental disabilities, AAIDD offers educational opportunities to the global disability community, including an annual conference, webinars, and professional research exchanges.

The association's YouTube channel provides short educational videos on topics related to intellectual and developmental disabilities.

== See also ==
- Leonard Abbeduto, AAIDD President, 2020-2021
- Michael Wehmeyer, AAIDD President, 2010-2011, also awarded the Association's 2003 "Education Award" and 2015 "Research Award"
- Steven Reiss, awarded the Association's 2003 "Research Award"
- Susan Parish, awarded the Association's 2001 "Research Award"
- Robert Bruinicks, awarded the Association's 1996 "Education Award"
- Robert Perske, awarded the Association's 1993 "Humanitarian Award"
- Gunnar Dybwad, awarded the Association's 1992 "Special Award" and 1997 "Humanitarian Award"
- Hugo Moser, awarded the Association's 1992 "Research Award"
- Frank Rusch, awarded the Association's 1991 "Education Award"
- Wolf Wolfensberger, awarded the Association's 1978 "Leadership Award"
- Margaret Giannini, awarded the Association's 1974 "Service Award"
- Eunice Kennedy Shriver, awarded the Association's 1973 "Humanitarian Award"
- Special education in the United States
