= Journal of Autism and Developmental Disorders =

- Discipline: Psychiatry
- Language: English
- Edited by: Lynn Kern Koegel

Publication details
- Former name(s): Journal of Autism and Childhood Schizophrenia
- History: 1971–present
- Publisher: Springer Science+Business Media
- Frequency: Monthly
- Open access: Hybrid
- Impact factor: 4.345 (2021)

Standard abbreviations
- ISO 4: J. Autism Dev. Disord.

Indexing
- ISSN: 0162-3257 (print); 1573-3432 (web)
- LCCN: 2004233364
- OCLC no.: 45091841
- Journal of Autism and Childhood Schizophrenia
- CODEN: JAUCB4
- ISSN: 0021-9185
- OCLC no.: 1784596

Links
- Journal homepage; Online archive

The Journal of Autism and Developmental Disorders is a monthly peer-reviewed medical journal covering research on all aspects of autism spectrum disorders and related developmental disabilities. The journal was established in 1971 as the Journal of Autism and Childhood Schizophrenia, obtaining its current title in 1979. It is published by Springer Science+Business Media and the editor-in-chief is Lynn Kern Koegel (Stanford University).

== Editors-in-chief ==
The following persons are or have been editor-in-chief:

- Leo Kanner (Johns Hopkins University School of Medicine, 1971–1974)
- Eric Schopler (University of North Carolina School of Medicine, 1974–1997)
- Michael Rutter (Institute of Psychiatry, King's College London, 1974–1994)
- Gary B. Mesibov (University of North Carolina School of Medicine, 1997–2007)
- Fred R. Volkmar (Yale University School of Medicine, 2007–2022)
- Lynn Kern Koegel (Stanford University, 2021–present)

== Abstracting and indexing ==
The journal is abstracted and indexed in:

- Biological Abstracts
- BIOSIS Previews
- CINAHL
- CSA databases
- Current Contents/Social and Behavioral Sciences
- EBSCO databases
- Education Resources Information Center
- Index Medicus/MEDLINE/PubMed
- PASCAL
- ProQuest databases
- PsycINFO
- Scopus
- Social Sciences Citation Index

According to the Journal Citation Reports, the journal has a 2021 impact factor of 4.345.
