= Treatment and Education of Autistic and Related Communication Handicapped Children =

University Organization

Coordinates: 35°53′30.1″N 79°4′50.51″W

The University of North Carolina TEACCH Autism Program
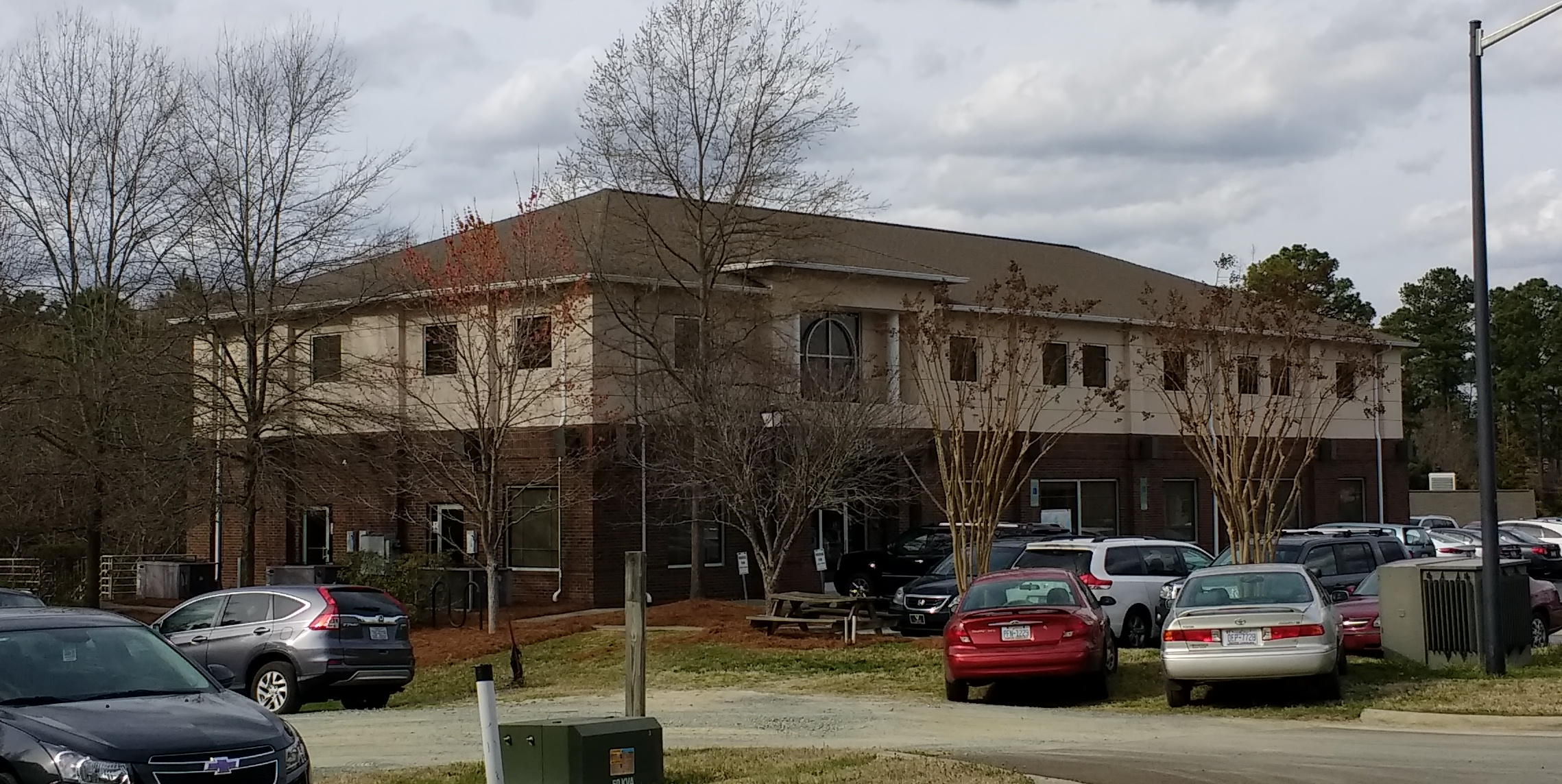
- Abbreviation: TEACCH (for "Treatment and Education of Autistic and Related Communication Handicapped Children")
- Formation: 1971
- Location: 100 Renee Lynne Court, Carrboro, NC
- Official language: English
- Director: Laura Klinger
- Parent organization: University of North Carolina School of Medicine
- Website: www.teacch.com

The University of North Carolina TEACCH Autism Program creates and disseminates community-based services, training programs and research for autistic individuals of all ages and skill levels.

The Treatment and Education of Autistic and Related Communication Handicapped Children (TEACCH) approach does not attempt to "cure" autism. Core tenets of the TEACCH philosophy include an understanding of the effects of autism on individuals; use of assessment to assist program design around individual strengths, skills, interests and needs; enabling the individual to be as independent as possible; and working in collaboration with parents and families.

Typical interventions include making a visual schedules and maintaining consistent routines. Overall, it is effective at improving some skills and reducing parental stress.

== Strategies ==
The emphasis on individualization means that TEACCH does not distinguish between people with very high skill levels and those with learning disabilities. Strategies used are designed to address the difficulties faced by all autistic people and be adaptable to whatever style and degree of support is required. TEACCH methodology is rooted in behavior therapy, more recently combining cognitive elements, guided by theories suggesting that behavior typical of people with autism results from underlying problems in perception and understanding. The strategies put forward by TEACCH do not work on the behavior directly, but on its underlying reasons, such as lack of understanding of what the person is expected to do or what will happen to them next, and sensory under- or overstimulation. By addressing communication deficits, the person will be supported to express their needs and feelings by means other than challenging behavior.

Example of a two-step visual schedule

First brush teeth.

Then Legos.

Working from the premise that autistic people are predominantly visual learners, support strategies are based around physical and visual structure, schedules, work systems and task organization. Individualized systems aim to address difficulties with communication, organization, generalization, concepts, sensory processing, change and relating to others. Whereas some other methods focus on addressing areas of weakness, the TEACCH approach works with existing strengths and emerging skill areas.

=== Five basic principles ===
1. It is important to create structured and supportive physical surroundings to support student success.
2. It is recommended to display a physical schedule that can be accessed and referred to by the student throughout their day.
3. The establishment of expectations and goals to support and encourage independence from the student with their tasks.
4. A strong emphasis of a consistent routine.
5. The incorporation of visual-cues for reminders.

== Effectiveness ==
In '...A Guide for Practitioners', Jordan describes the literature on TEACCH as providing 'very positive, but not remarkable, results'. It is effective at improving some skills, such as social skills and fine motor skills, but studies disagree about whether it is effective at improving other skills, such as communication and daily living skills. TEACCH programs also reduce parental stress.

== History ==
The TEACCH approach was developed at the University of North Carolina at Chapel Hill, originating in a child research project begun in 1964 by Eric Schopler and Robert Reichler. In 1965, Schopler visited the Sybil Elgar School in London and drew inspiration from the method developed by Sybil Elgar. Later, the results of this pilot study indicated that the children involved made good progress, and consequently state finance supported the formation of Division TEACCH.

Founded in 1971 by Eric Schopler, TEACCH provides training and services geared to supporting autistic children and their families. Gary B. Mesibov, a professor and researcher on UNC's TEACCH program since about 1979, was director of the program from 1992 to 2010. It is a "pioneering" program for assisting with education, research and service delivery for autistic individuals.

In 2003 Mesibov and Schopler described TEACCH as the United Kingdom's most common intervention used with autistic children. In Europe and the United States, it is also commonly used.
