= Autism Research =

- Discipline: Child psychiatry
- Language: English
- Edited by: David Amaral

Publication details
- History: 2008–present
- Publisher: Wiley-Blackwell
- Frequency: Bimonthly
- Impact factor: 4.532 (2013)

Standard abbreviations
- ISO 4: Autism Res.

Indexing
- ISSN: 1939-3792 (print); 1939-3806 (web)
- LCCN: 2007216027
- OCLC no.: 159959578

Links
- Journal homepage; Online access; Online archive

Autism Research is a bimonthly peer-reviewed medical journal covering research on autism and other pervasive developmental disorders. It was established in 2008 and is the official journal of the International Society for Autism Research.

It is published bimonthly by Wiley-Blackwell. The editor-in-chief is David G. Amaral (University of California).

According to the Journal Citation Reports, the journal has a 2013 impact factor of 4.532, ranking it 4th out of 65 journals in the category "Psychology, Developmental" and 5th out of 49 journals in the category "Behavioral Sciences".

== Editors ==
The following persons have been editor-in-chief:

- Anthony J. Bailey (University of British Columbia), 2008–2015
- David G. Amaral (University of California), 2015–present

== Abstracting and indexing ==
The journal is abstracted and indexed in:

- BIOSIS Previews
- Current Contents/Social & Behavioral Sciences
- Embase
- MEDLINE/PubMed
- PsycINFO/Psychological Abstracts
- Science Citation Index Expanded
- Scopus
- Social Sciences Citation Index
