= History of autism =

The history of autism encompasses various conceptual and treatment approaches, with the understanding of autism having been shaped by cultural, scientific, and societal factors. Pathologized or viewed as beneficial as part of neurodiversity, autism has been subject to various treatments (e.g. electroconvulsive therapy) Progress in scientific understanding of autism has contributed to both treatment and perceptions of autism.

The term autism was first introduced by Eugen Bleuler in his description of schizophrenia in 1911. The diagnosis of schizophrenia was broader than its modern equivalent; autistic children were often diagnosed with childhood schizophrenia. The earliest research that focused on children who would today be considered autistic was conducted by Grunya Sukhareva starting in the 1920s. In the 1930s and 1940s, Hans Asperger and Leo Kanner described two related syndromes, later termed Asperger syndrome and infantile autism. Kanner thought that the condition he had described might be distinct from schizophrenia, and in the following decades, research into what would become known as autism accelerated. Formally, however, autistic children continued to be diagnosed under various terms related to schizophrenia in both the Diagnostic and Statistical Manual of Mental Disorders (DSM) and International Classification of Diseases (ICD), but by the early 1970s, it had becomKannere more widely recognized that autism and schizophrenia were in fact distinct disorders, and in 1980, this was formalized for the first time with new diagnostic categories in the DSM-III. Asperger syndrome was introduced to the DSM as a formal diagnosis in 1994, but in 2013, Asperger syndrome and infantile autism were reunautified into a single diagnostic category, autism spectrum disorder (ASD).

Autistic individuals often struggle with understanding non-verbal social cues and emotional sharing. The development of the web has given many autistic people a way to form online communities, work remotely, and attend school remotely which can directly benefit those experiencing difficulty communicating typically. Societal and cultural aspects of autism have developed: some in the community seek a cure, while others believe that autism is simply another way of being.

Although the rise of organizations and charities relating to advocacy for autistic people and their caregivers and efforts to destigmatize ASD have affected how ASD is viewed, autistic individuals and their caregivers continue to experience social stigma in situations where autistic peoples' behaviour is thought of negatively, and many primary care physicians and medical specialists express beliefs consistent with outdated autism research.

The discussion of autism has brought about much controversy. Without researchers being able to meet a consensus on the varying forms of the condition, there was for a time a lack of research being conducted on what is now classed as autism. Discussing the syndrome and its complexity frustrated researchers. Controversies have surrounded various claims regarding the etiology of autism.

== Autism before the term "autism" (until 1908) ==
=== In European folklore ===
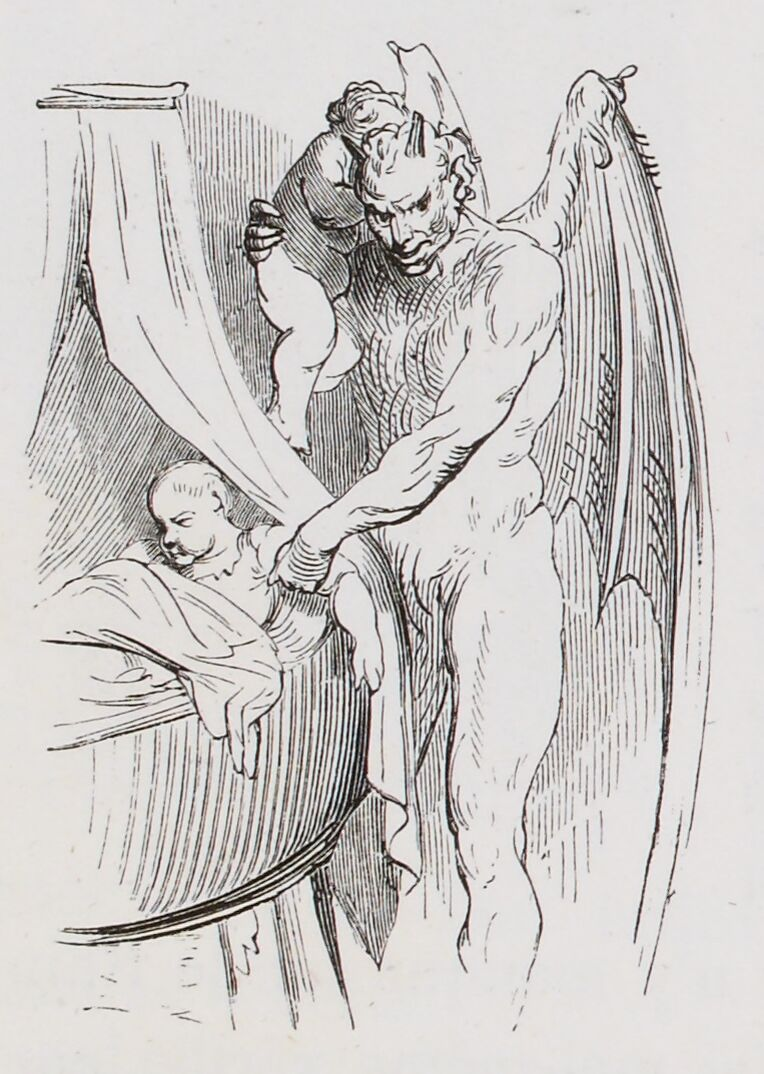
A devil swaps a child for a changeling in this 1862 illustration by Gustave Doré.

Scholars have suggested that stories of changelings in European folklore may have originated as a folk explanation for autism. The tales involve young children being taken by fairies or other beings, and replaced by changelings. These children were "unresponsive, resistant to affection, did not express emotion, cried a lot or did not speak." Autism may not be initially apparent when a child is very young but become more clear over time, which contributed to the myth that a child had been replaced. The connection between changeling tales and autism was first proposed in 2005 by Australian social scientist Julie Leask. She was prompted into the line of inquiry after hearing a modern mother claim her true child had been "stolen".

=== Autistic people before "autism" ===
Authors have identified cases, from long before the term "autism" was created, of people who perhaps today would have been diagnosed as autistic. The Table Talk of Martin Luther, compiled by his note taker, Mathesius, contains the story of a 12-year-old boy who may have been autistic with high support needs. The earliest well-documented case of autism is that of Hugh Blair of Borgue, as detailed in a 1747 court case in which his brother successfully petitioned to annul Blair's marriage to gain Blair's inheritance.

Henry Cavendish was a prolific natural philosopher, first published in 1766. During his life, Cavendish was considered eccentric and his behaviour was described as "peculiarly shy" by contemporaries. When researching Cavendish as a subject for a 2001 article in the journal Neurology, neurologist Oliver Sacks determined that evidence for an ASD diagnosis was "almost overwhelming".

=== Early descriptions of autistic behaviors ===
Aphasia voluntaria was defined in 1877 by German doctor Adolf Kussmaul as choosing not to speak.

Developmental retardation was a term British doctor John Down used in 1877 to describe conditions including what would be considered autism today.

Echolalia is the practice of repeating other people's words without explicit awareness. French doctor Jean Marc Gaspard Itard coined the term in 1825.

Interoception and proprioception were concepts introduced in 1906 by British neurophysiologist Charles Sherrington. Interoception describes the sensory system that receives internal information from the body. Autistic people's minds are sometimes less effective at receiving this information than those of non-autistic people, particularly during childhood or when experiencing sensory overload. Sometimes interoceptive signals in autistic people are stronger than is typical in non-autistic people. Proprioception describes the system that senses the position and location of muscles, tendons and joints. Autistic people's minds can be less effective at receiving this information than those of non-autistic people.

Monomania was defined around 1810 by French psychiatrist Jean-Étienne Dominique Esquirol, who published about it in 1827. It was centred on the contemporary concept of the fixed idea, or idée fixe, a single subject of obsession in an otherwise healthy mind.

Obsessional thought was explored by Austrian psychiatrist Richard von Krafft-Ebing in a pioneering 1867 work.

Obsessive neurosis was a term first used by Austrian psychiatrist Sigmund Freud in 1894.

Palilalia was initially defined as auto-echolalia by French doctor Édouard Brissaud in 1899.

Psychasthenia was a newly defined condition included in French psychiatrist Pierre Janet's 1903 book Les Obsessions et la Psychasthénie, meaning The obsessions and psychasthenia. Soviet psychiatrist Grunya Sukhareva believed it to be a component of schizoid psychopathy in childhood.

Savant syndrome was described by John Down in an 1887 lecture. He used the term idiots savants for people whose mental abilities were generally poor but who had strong abilities in a particular area.

Sensory overload in urban environments was discussed by German sociologist Georg Simmel in his 1903 essay "The Metropolis and Mental Life".

Stereotypy was first defined by French psychiatrist Jean-Pierre Falret in 1864.

==== Dementia praecox and related conditions ====
The term dementia praecox (premature dementia) was first used by German psychiatrist Heinrich Schüle in 1880, and also by 1891 by Arnold Pick, a Czech professor of psychiatry.

Scottish psychiatrist Thomas Clouston in his 1883 book Clinical Lectures on Mental Diseases, described a new condition he called psychoneurosis.

The term "dementia praecox" was greatly popularised in 1899 through the sixth edition of German Psychiatrist Emil Kraepelin's book Psychiatrie. Ein Lehrbuch für Studirende und Aerzte (Psychiatry. A text-book for students and physicians). This condition was defined very broadly by today's standards. The primary disturbance in dementia praecox was seen to be a disruption in cognitive or mental functioning in attention, memory, and goal-directed behaviour.

Italian psychiatrist Sante De Sanctis briefly mentioned a condition in a 1906 paper he called dementia praecocissima (very premature dementia), which was a form of dementia praecox that started very early in people's lives. He wrote about it in more detail in a 1908 paper.

Austrian educator Theodor Heller defined a condition called dementia infantilis (infantile dementia) in 1908.

== Autism as a symptom of schizophrenia (1908–1924) ==
=== Major contributors ===
==== Eugen Bleuler ====
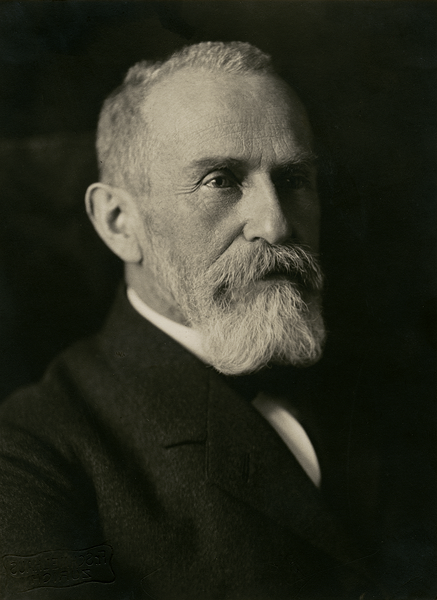
Eugen Bleuler created the concept of autism, using it to describe a type of behaviour.

Swiss psychiatrist Eugen Bleuler gave a lecture explaining that dementia praecox was very different to other forms of dementia in April 1908. He proposed that it be given the unique name schizophrenia - a split mind. What is now known as "schizophrenia" is different from what Bleuler described. He included what is today considered as autism, schizoid personality disorder and various schizophrenia spectrum and other psychotic disorders in his definition.

Bleuler coined the word autismus (English translation autism) in July 1910. He derived autismus from the Greek word: αὐτός, romanized: autós, lit. 'self', and used it to mean morbid self-admiration, referring to "autistic withdrawal of the patient to his fantasies, against which any influence from outside becomes an intolerable disturbance".

He first used it in print to describe a symptom of schizophrenia in the scientific paper "Zur Theorie des schizophrenen Negativismus" (On the theory of schizophrenic negativism).

Bleuler believed that the idiosyncratic behaviours of people displaying autistic behaviour were due to engaging with personal fantasy rather than with the world as it is. He believed they drew on an early childhood mental state that was unable to form theory of mind.

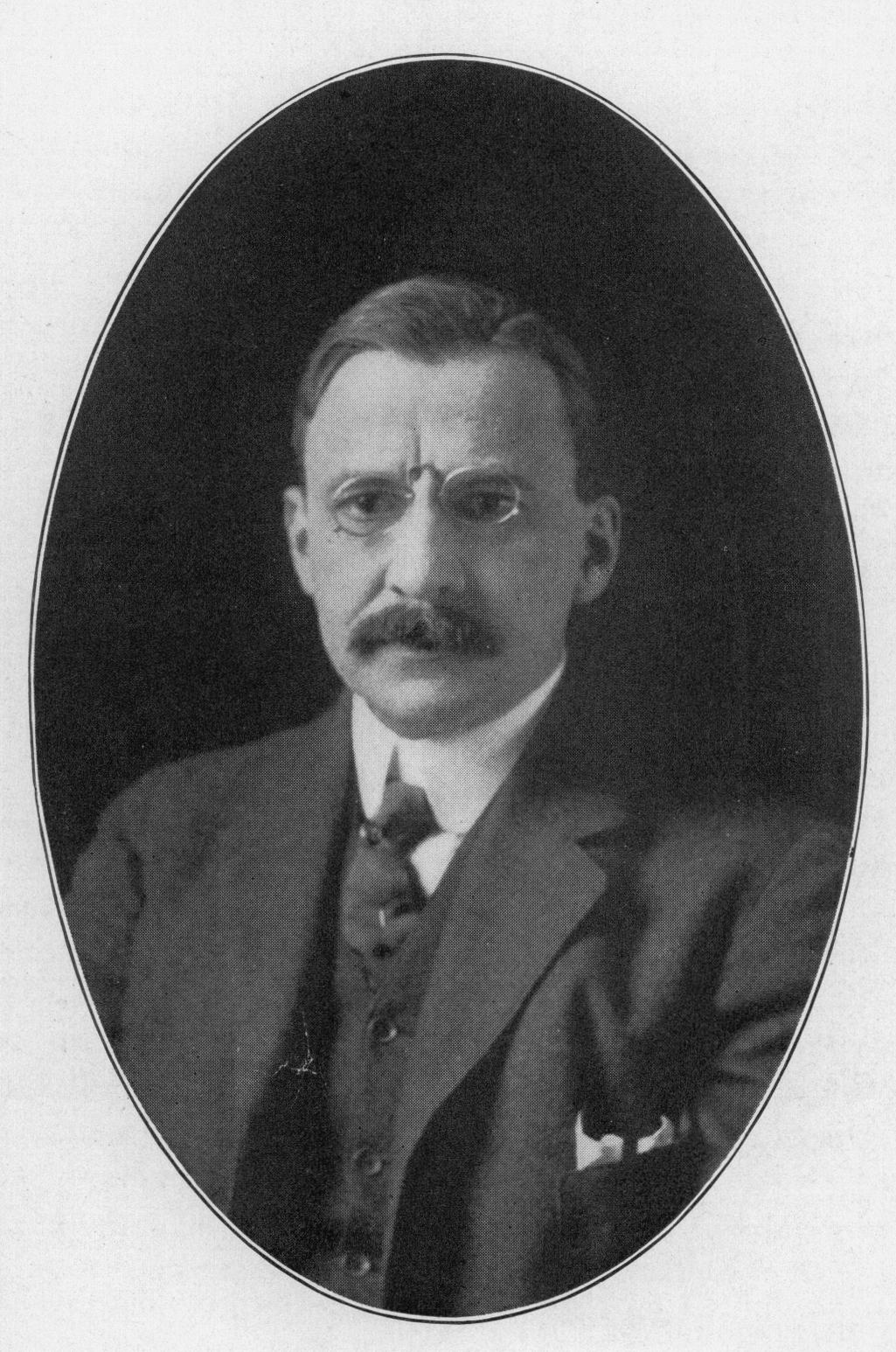
August Hoch defined the shut-in character type.

==== August Hoch ====
Swiss-American psychiatrist August Hoch defined the concept of the shut-in personality. In papers published in 1909 and 1910, he described it as including reticence, seclusiveness, shyness and a preference for living in fantasy worlds. They might also have difficulties with romantic and sexual relationships. According to Hoch, a high proportion of patients with dementia praecox had shut-in behaviour prior to developing more serious symptoms.

==== Gannushkin and Kraepelin ====
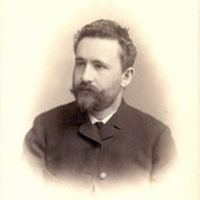
Emil Kraepelin defined the verschrobene (eccentric) character type.

Psychiatrists Pyotr Gannushkin and Emil Kraepelin detailed character types that would later be considered schizoid by Grunya Sukhareva.

Kraepelin described patients who, despite their intelligence, could show traits inconsistent with their mental abilities. They could be forgetful, absent-minded and show variable intellectual capacity.

They might also be extravagant in their thinking, communicate in a rambling or confusing manner, and occupy themselves with fruitless plans. They might also have difficulty connecting with others.

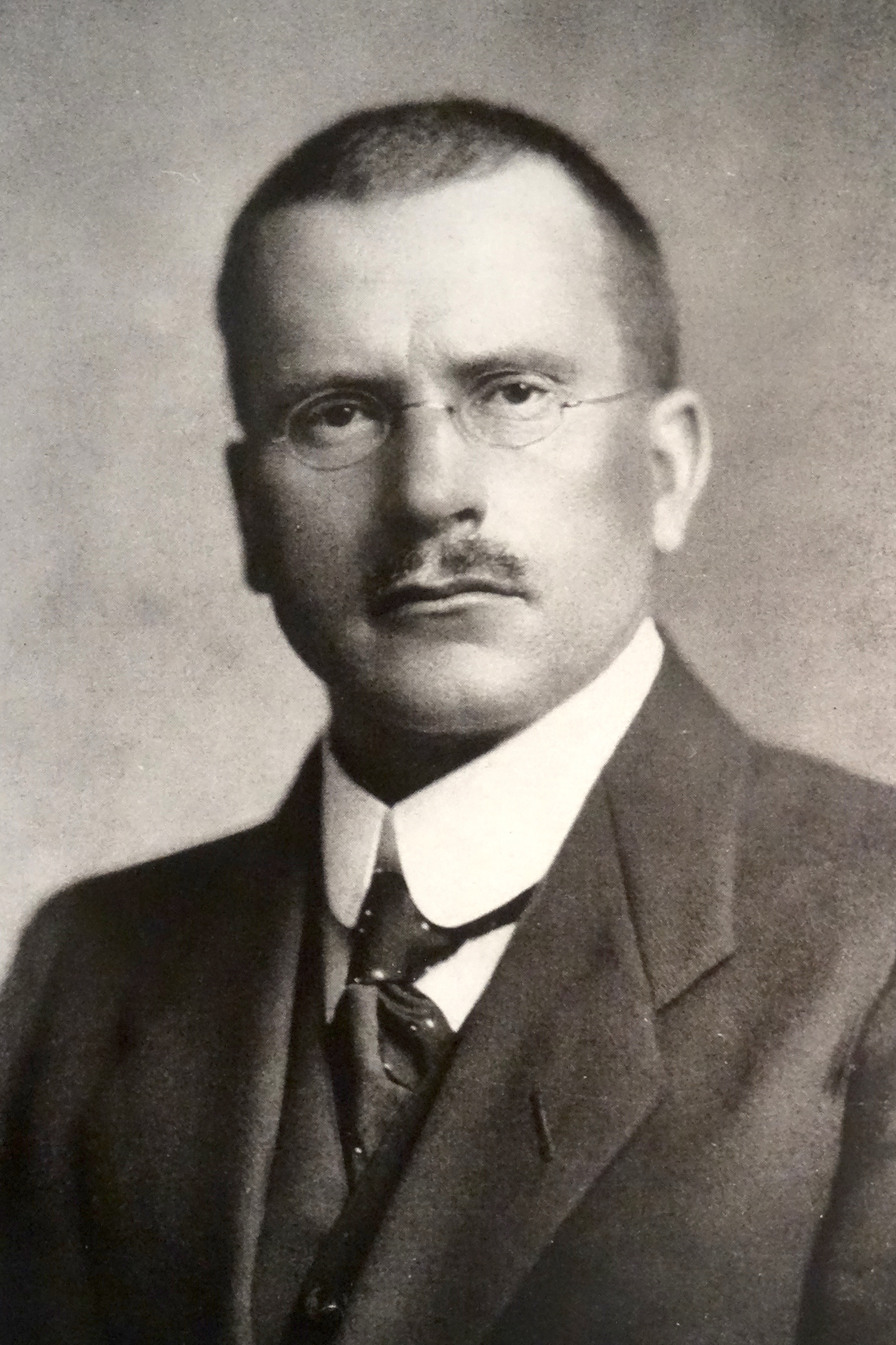
Carl Jung coined the term introverted.

==== Carl Jung ====
In September 1909, Swiss psychiatrist Carl Jung used the term introverted in a lecture at Clark University to describe love turned inward, increasing imaginative activity. The lecture was published in 1910, which was the term’s first appearance in print.

A more concise definition of the introverted type was given by Jung in February 1936, in his paper "Psychologische Typologie" (Psychological Typology). It included:

He holds aloof from external happenings, does not join in, has a distinct dislike of society as soon as he finds himself among too many people. In a large gathering he feels lonely and lost. The more crowded it is, the greater becomes his resistance. He is not in the least "with it", and has no love of enthusiastic get-togethers. He is not a good mixer. What he does, he does in his own way, barricading himself against influences from outside. He is apt to appear awkward, often seeming inhibited, and it frequently happens that, by a certain brusqueness of manner, or by his glum unapproachability, or some kind of malapropism, he causes unwitting offence to people...

Hans Asperger would later see similarities between Jung's introversion and his concept of autism.Carl Jung's 1921 book Psychologische Typen was published as Personality Types in English in 1923.

=== Introduction of the term schizoid ===
In 1924, psychiatrist Ernst Kretschmer described schizoid people as socially withdrawn, suspicious of others, and lacking in conversational abilities. They are at the same time complacent and sensitive. Their interests may be narrow, vague, or grandiose.

Bleuler also believed that everyone had a schizoid element, to a greater or lesser degree.

=== Publications and media ===
In 1924, psychiatrist Moritz Tramer published a paper describing described idiot savants, "Einseitig Talentierte und Begabte Schwachsinnige" (Singularly talented and gifted mental defectives).

=== Organizations ===
American teacher Elizabeth Farrell founded the International Council for the Education of Exceptional Children on August 10, 1922 to bring together teachers of disabled children. The group later became the Council for Exceptional Children.

== Pioneering research (1925–1945) ==
=== Major contributors ===
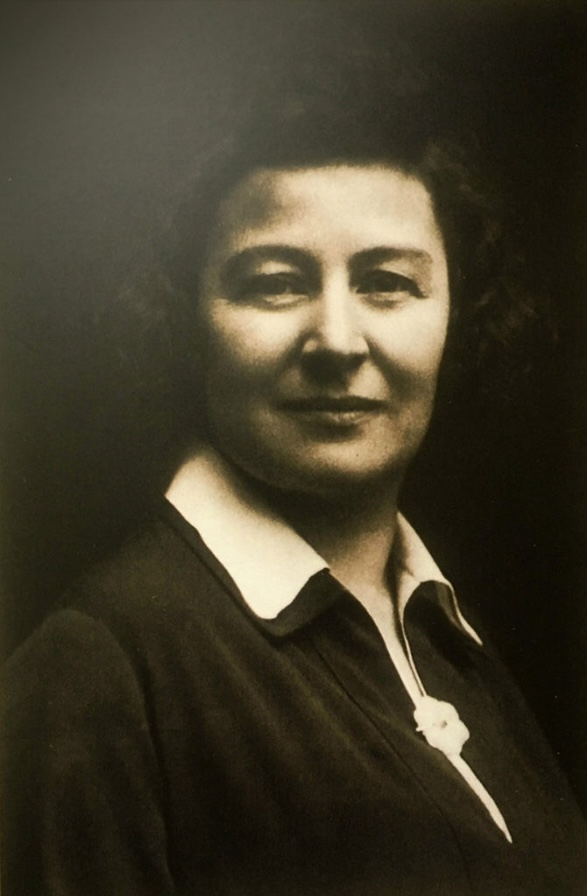
Grunya Sukhareva described children who would now be considered autistic.

==== Grunya Sukhareva ====
Soviet child psychiatrist Grunya Sukhareva was the first to publish a comprehensive clinical description of children who would now be considered autistic. In 1921, she founded a school for children with psychological problems at the Psychoneurological Department for Children in Moscow.

In 1925, she published a paper offering a detailed description of what she called schizoid psychopathies in children, along with six case studies of boys. (A German version appeared in 1926.) Her description closely resembled the diagnostic criteria for autism spectrum disorder in the DSM-5.

According to Sukhareva, the children generally remained apart from their peers and had difficulty adapting to social environments. They showed a tendency towards abstract and schematic thinking, which made them appear eccentric to their classmates. She described a preference for fantastical stories and fairy tales, avoidance of group play, and a tendency towards solitude from early childhood. Loneliness and social isolation were prevalent. Several children experienced ridicule or name-calling from other children, such as being called "talking machines."

Several children displayed what she called flatness and superficiality of feelings. She also noted limited facial expressions and expressive movements.

Sukhareva noted a tendency to stick to work that had been started, a kind of rigidity of thinking and difficulty adapting to the new. Four of the six children presented with what she described as a silly demeanour, including a tendency to rhyme and create stereotypical new words. She also noted linguistic peculiarities and difficulties with movement.

Sukhareva distinguished the condition from schizophrenia, arguing that the two shared some clinical features but differed profoundly in their underlying development. She nevertheless proposed that the condition involved an inborn deficiency in systems also affected in schizophrenia.

In 1927, she published a paper focusing on five girls with the condition and describing differences between boys and girls. One of her patients "strives to mask her embarrassment with laughter, grimaces, and superfluous movements."

In 1930, Sukhareva published a paper describing difficulties with movement, emotional responses and thinking.

Between 1932 and 1936, Sukhareva went on to publish several papers about childhood schizophrenia.

Her work was read and cited by other researchers, which included Louise Despert, Charles Bradley and Leo Kanner. However, she remained little known outside Russia.

==== Hans Asperger ====
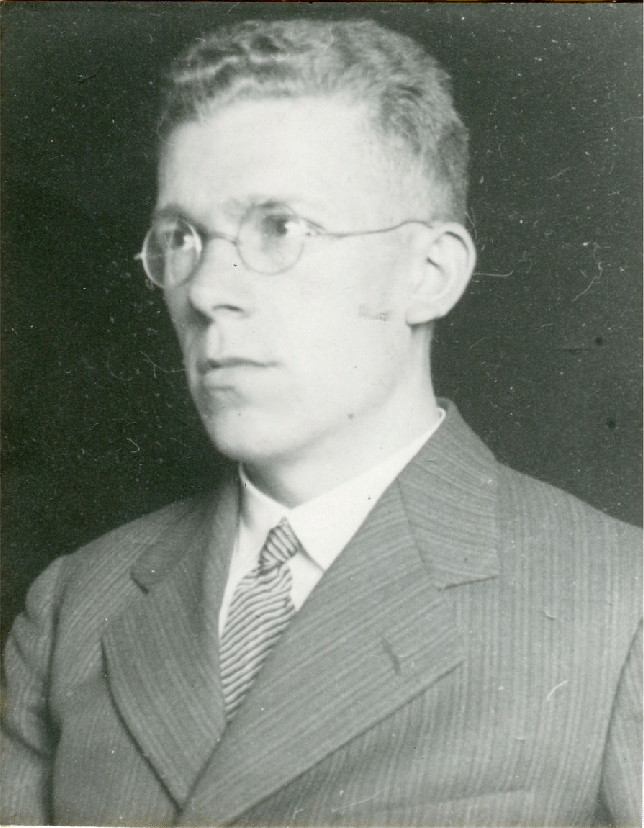
Hans Asperger was the first to publish the name autism for a specific condition, and the first to document many of that condition's attributes.

On 3 October 1938, Asperger gave a lecture in Vienna in which he used the terms "autism" and "autistic psychopath" to describe a pattern he had observed in his patients and others. He presented two cases and told his audience that children whose behaviour seemed unusual could also be highly intelligent. Asperger made this point as part of a discussion of a Nazi forced sterilization law that would later be introduced in Austria. Asperger publicly supported this law and in his clinical work, he recommended sending children with disabilities to Spiegelgrund, a Vienna clinic where children were killed under a Nazi program.

Asperger expanded on his ideas regarding autism in a thesis he submitted to the University of Vienna in October 1942. A revised version appeared in June 1944 as "The 'Autistic Psychopaths' in Childhood". In the 61-page paper, Asperger described four children and discussed the traits they shared. Soviet child psychiatrist Grunya Sukhareva had described children with similar traits in the 1920s, but Asperger did not cite her in either version and it remains unclear whether he had read her work.

Asperger's work itself remained little known among English-speaking clinicians for decades. In the 1970 English edition of Infantile Autism, German child psychiatrist Gerhard Bosch compared the children Asperger described with those described by child psychiatrist Leo Kanner. In 1981, British psychiatrist Lorna Wing used the name "Asperger syndrome" in a paper about the pattern Asperger had described. In 1991, developmental psychologist Uta Frith's English translation made Asperger's 1944 paper available to a wider readership.

==== George Frankl ====
In 1934, psychiatrist George Frankl published Befehlen und Gehorchen ("Command and Obey") while working at a children's clinic in Vienna. He found that some children understood the words of an instruction but had difficulty picking up what the speaker's tone told them about how it was meant. Frankl left Vienna in 1937 and began working with child psychiatrist Leo Kanner at Johns Hopkins Hospital in 1938.

In his 1943 paper "Language and Affective Contact", Frankl described how tone of voice, facial expressions, and gestures help people communicate feelings. The paper appeared in the same issue of Nervous Child as Kanner's first paper on autism.

In a later, unpublished manuscript on autism, Frankl described a child whose father greeted him with "hello baby" before they played together. The child began using the same words to ask other people to play. This was an example of echolalia, the repetition of words or phrases a person has heard. In this case, the phrase had taken on a new meaning through the child's play with his father.

==== Leo Kanner ====
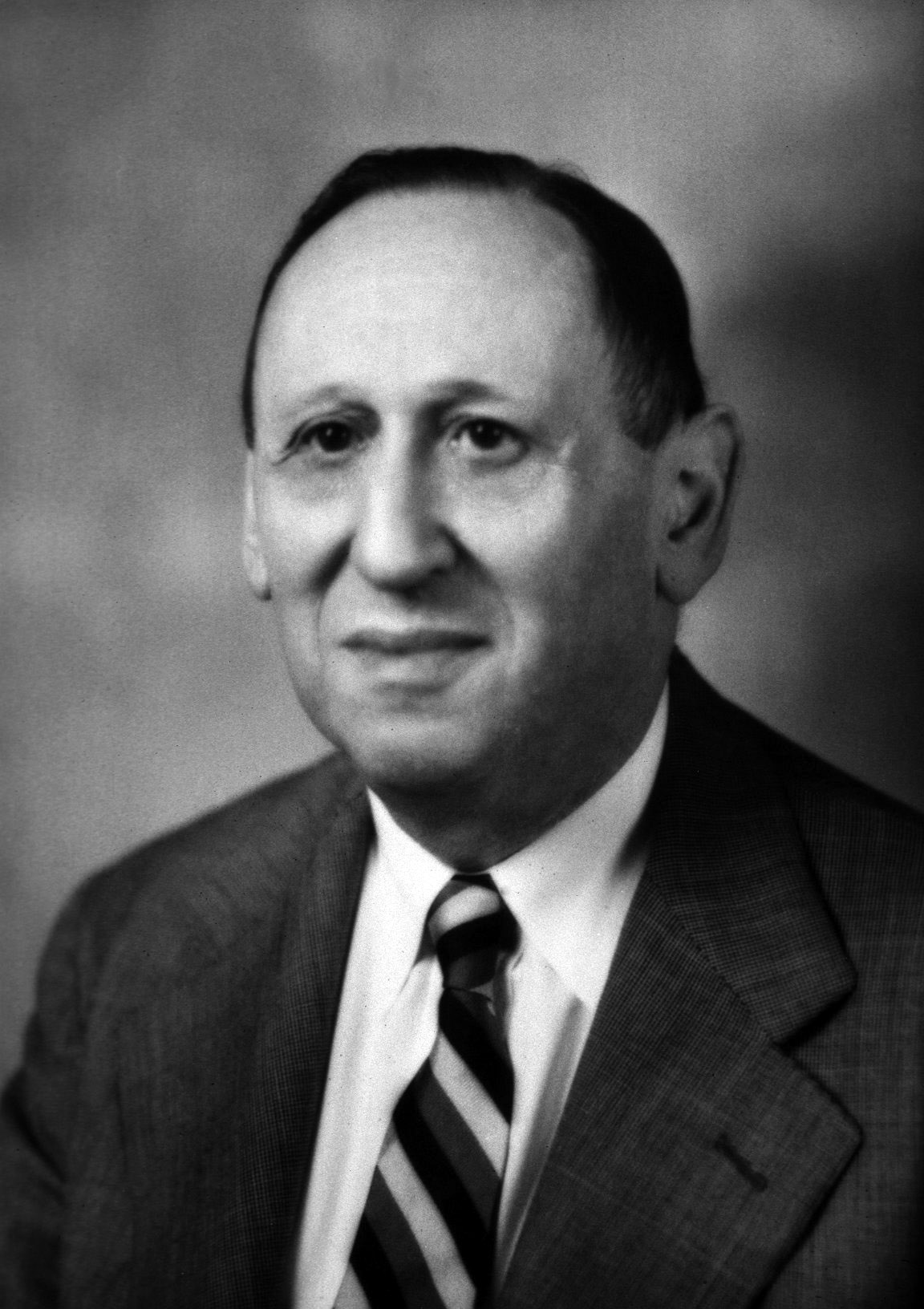
In 1943, Leo Kanner described autism as a condition distinct from childhood schizophrenia.

In October 1938, five-year-old Donald Triplett went to see Kanner at Johns Hopkins Hospital in Baltimore. Triplett was the first of 11 children Kanner described in his 1943 paper "Autistic Disturbances of Affective Contact".

Kanner saw similarities in both how the children interacted with other people and in the ways they responded to change. He called these features "autistic aloneness" and "insistence on sameness". For example, some of these children became distressed when a familiar object was moved or when a routine changed. He also noted that some of the children would repeat words or phrases they had heard.

Kanner proposed that the children's shared traits pointed to a condition present from birth and which was distinct from childhood schizophrenia. In 1944, he described it as "early infantile autism".

In his 1943 paper, Kanner also described many of the children's parents as being emotionally distant. "In the whole group, there are few really warmhearted fathers and mothers. For the most part, the parents, grandparents, and collaterals are persons strongly preoccupied with abstractions of a scientific, literary, or artistic nature, and limited in genuine interest in people." In 1949, he compared some of the children's home environments to "emotional refrigerators". That comparison supported the hypothesis that a lack of parental warmth could cause autism, which later became known as the refrigerator mother theory.

=== Cognitive theories and concepts ===
During this period, the term autism came to be used quite widely, with a variety of related meanings.

Russian-French psychiatrist Eugène Minkowski submitted a thesis in 1926. In it he proposed that autism comes from the patient's loss of contact with reality, and was the core component of "schizophrenia". He thought autism was of two types, "rich" (full of fantasy/psychosis) and "poor" (with few thoughts and feelings). Contrary to Bleuer, he thought that the vast majority of autistic cases were of the "poor" type.

American sociologist Mildred Parten first defined the term parallel play in her 1929 doctoral dissertation.

In May 1933, American psychiatrist Howard Potter defined six diagnostic criteria for childhood schizophrenia, which Kanner would later say was important when thinking about autism:

1. A generalized retraction of interests from the environment.
2. Dereistic thinking, feeling and acting.
3. Disturbances of thought, manifested through blocking, symbolization, condensation, perseveration, incoherence and diminution, sometimes to the extent of mutism.
4. Defect in emotional rapport.
5. Diminution, rigidity and distortion of affect.
6. Alterations of behaviour with either an increase of motility, leading to incessant activity, or a diminution of motility, reacting to complete immobility or bizarre behaviour with a tendency to perseveration or stereotypy.

In 1934, Moritz Tramer published the paper "Elektiver Mutismus bei Kindern" (Elective Mutism in Children), coining the term elective mutism.

In 1934, Soviet psychiatrist Evgenia Grebelskaya-Albatz divided people with childhood "schizophrenia" into two groups, those with intelligence within the normal range, and those with below average intelligence.

In 1942, Lauretta Bender described the condition of childhood schizophrenia as a "definite syndrome", a "pathology at every level and in every field of integration within the functioning of the central nervous system".

=== Fragile X syndrome ===
In July 1943, the British neurologist James Martin and British geneticist Julia Bell described a pedigree of X-linked intellectual disability. This would later be called Fragile X syndrome, and is now considered one of the genetic causes of autism.

=== Publications and media ===
In 1929, German psychiatrist Erich Rudolf Jaensch published Grundformen menschlichen Seins (Basic forms of human existence). Asperger would later say his autism thinking was influenced by its explanation of schizothyms.

In 1930, psychoanalyst Melanie Klein published a case study of a four-year-old boy she called Dick. In 1983, child psychotherapist Frances Tustin interpreted Klein's account as an early description of an autistic child.

In April 1935, Anni Weiss published the paper "Qualitative intelligence testing as a means of diagnosis in the examination of psychopathic children", which includes a case study about an autistic boy.

In June 1938, American psychiatrist Louise Despert published case studies of individuals later identified as autistic.

In her 1938 paper "Psychoses in Children", British psychiatrist Mildred Creak reviewed cases from the children's department of the Maudsley Hospital in London. She discussed how to distinguish childhood schizophrenia from developmental difficulties that had been present from an early age.

In the late 1930s, Ida Frye and her colleagues at the Paedological Institute in Nijmegen, in the Netherlands, began describing autism in children. Psychologist Alfons Chorus published a series of articles on the institute's work in 1939 and 1940.

In his 1941 book Schizophrenia in Childhood, American psychiatrist Charles Bradley described childhood schizophrenia as involving psychosis that developed after birth. When Leo Kanner introduced the diagnosis of early infantile autism in 1943, he regarded it as present from birth and treated it as a separate condition.

=== Organizations ===
The American Academy of Speech Correction (AASC), later the American Speech–Language–Hearing Association, was founded in 1925. It brought together people working to correct serious communication problems, including some with autism. In 2022, the US Centers for Disease Control and Prevention (CDC) noted that "The most common developmental therapy for people with ASD is Speech and Language Therapy."

== Increasing awareness (1946–1967) ==
Starting in the early 1950s, awareness of "autism" as a distinct condition began to spread to psychiatrists and the wider culture in the United States, before spreading to Europe and other places.disorders a clear definition.

One was "Schizophrenic reaction, childhood type" (000-x28), used in cases of "psychotic reactions", including those manifesting primarily autism. This diagnosis was used in cases where there were intellectual disturbances, repetitive behaviour, or a retreat from reality. The other was "Schizoid personality" (000-x42), which was characterized by avoidance of close relations with others, inability to express ordinary aggressive feelings, and autistic thinking.

=== Major contributors ===
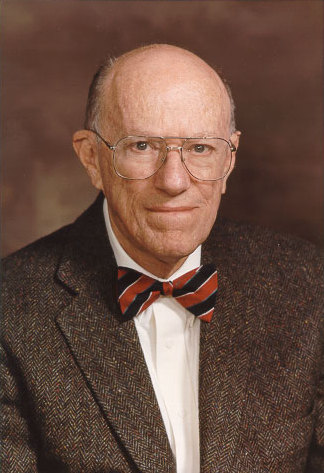
Psychiatrist Leon Eisenberg

==== Kanner and Eisenberg ====
In February 1956, psychiatrist Leon Eisenberg published a paper in which he compared the childhood and adolescence of 63 autistic people. Through his work, he identified difficulty understanding social information as the central feature of autism. Almost a third developed at least a moderate ability to manage social situations, mainly those who had used meaningful language by the age of five.

In July that year, Leo Kanner and Eisenberg drew on ten times as much clinical material as Kanner’s earlier work and published a paper proposing two essential features of autism: extreme social withdrawal and insistence on keeping things the same. They argued that differences in language development arose from difficulties relating to others.

Supporting the refrigerator mother hypothesis, the paper notes: "The emotional frigidity in the typical autistic family suggests a dynamic experiential factor in the genesis of the disorder in the child."

Kanner released the third edition of his textbook Child Psychiatry in 1957. It included an extensive chapter on "early infantile autism", which he categorised as a type of schizophrenia. Regarding the treatment of child schizophrenia as a whole, he wrote: "Whenever possible, frequent sessions with a psychiatrist may enhance the child's ability to form relationships and wean him away from the temptation to schizophrenic withdrawal."

==== Mildred Creak ====
Until 1961, autistic children in the UK were often institutionalised from a young age. Poor disease control in these institutions often led to a quick death. At this time, the British government sought to discover exactly how many psychotic children there were in the UK. They commissioned Mildred Creak of Great Ormond Street Hospital to lead a group to define the symptoms of childhood psychosis/schizophrenia, and the group completed their work the same year. They came up with a nine-point definition that soon became widely used in that country, and in time would form the definition of the condition used in most of the world through the ICD.

The nine points were more detailed than Sukhareva's similar definition. They lacked the earlier definition's mention of OCD and clumsiness, and added the inclusion of anxiety. A major difference came in Creak's ninth point: "A background of serious retardation in which islets of normal, near normal, or exceptional intellectual function or skill may appear."

As the new definition took off, the autistic condition began to be seen as involving a lack of fantasy rather than an excess of it.

=== Cognitive theories and concepts ===
American psychologist Herman Witkin and his colleagues first published about his concept of field dependence in 1962. It related to the difference between people in either focusing on fine detail or the "big picture" (also known as "bottom up" and "top down" thinking). Autistic people were later found to more commonly focus on the former, compared to non-autistic people.

=== Treatment approaches and social policy ===
In 1955, Niels Bank-Mikkelsen, Director of the Danish Service for Mental Retardation, proposed the normalisation principle, defining it as "The possibility for the mentally retarded to lead an existence as close to normal as possible." In 1959, this was adopted into Danish law.

In the 1960s, husband-and-wife American dance teachers Diane and Albert Pesso developed and began to teach the "microtracking" practice. This aims to give practitioners an ability to understand the subconscious and conscious minds of an observed person, through observing facial expression and body language. It forms part of the Pesso Boyden System Psychomotor (PBSP).

American psychologist Robert Zaslow developed the "Z-process" in the 1960s, first publicly presenting about it in 1967. This process attempted to force greater emotional attachment in autistic children by enraging them while holding them against their will. He believed this would lead to a breakdown in their defence mechanisms, making them more receptive to others. The process was demonstrated in the 1969 film Change of Habit, with Elvis Presley shown using it to successfully treat a young autistic girl. Use of the process on an adult saw Zaslow lose his licence to practice psychology in California in 1971. Zazlow wrote about his work in a 1975 book.

=== Public awareness and cultural representation ===
Rosemary Kennedy as a young woman.

Rosemary Kennedy, sister of US President John F Kennedy, was autistic. Her sister Eunice Kennedy Shriver made the public aware of this through an article in the New York Post in September 1962.

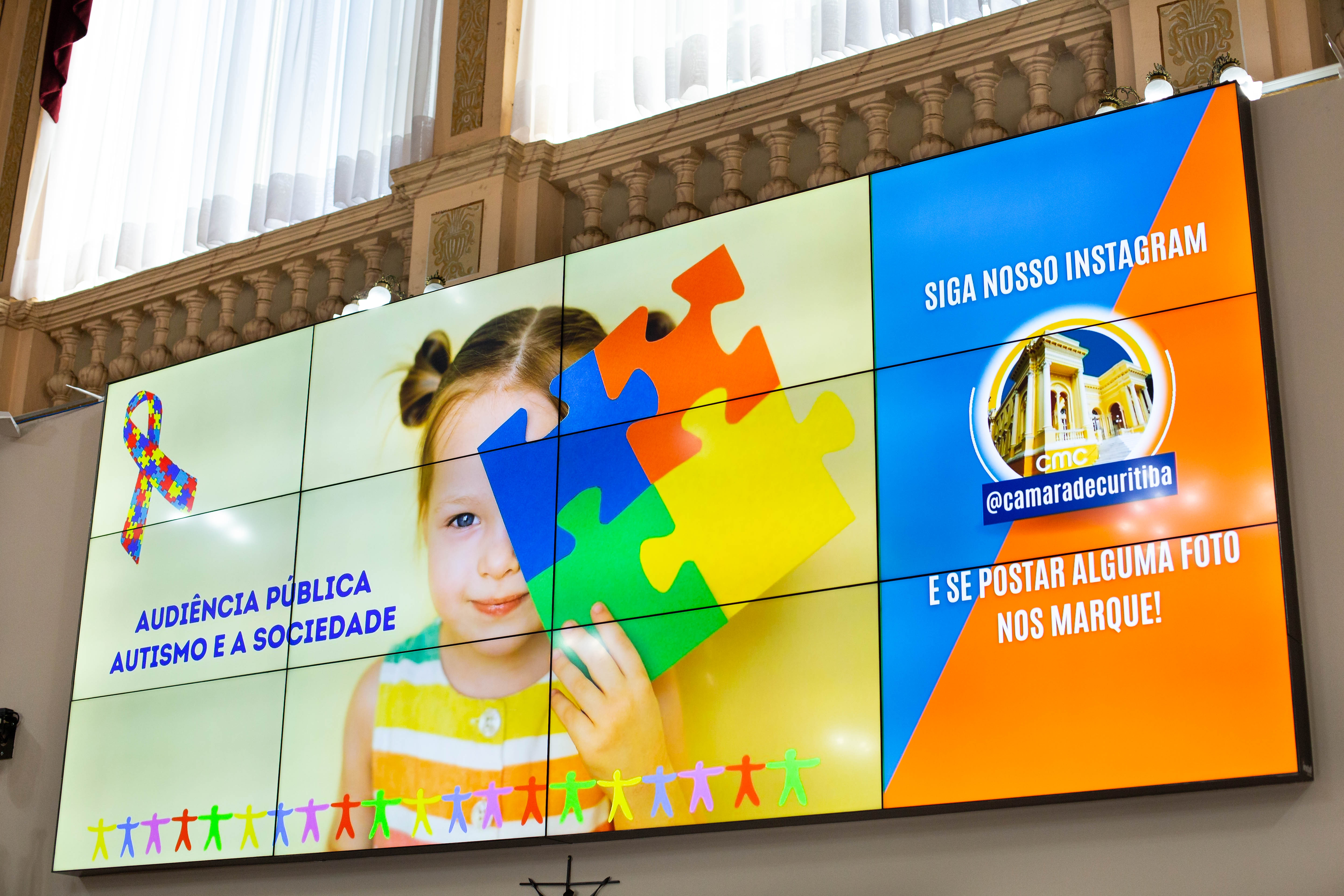
The puzzle piece symbol to represent autism is still in use today.

The Society proposed the "puzzle piece" as a symbol for autism in 1963, because it reflected their view of autism as a "puzzling condition".

In February 1965, American TV aired an episode of the series Directions entitled "Conall", the story of a boy with autism told by his family.

In May that year, Life magazine published an article on the work led by Norwegian-American behaviourist psychologist Ivar Lovaas at UCLA's Young Autism Project. "Screams, Slaps and Love" showed how the adults working with autistic children hit them as part of their training.

Both this TV episode and magazine article led to further awareness of the condition in the United States. Later in 1965, this newfound awareness coalesced as Rimland, Lovaas, nurse Ruth C. Sullivan and others founded the National Society for Autistic Children (NSAC). Leo Kanner and Carl Fenichel soon joined its Professional Advisory Board.

September 1966 saw the first episodes of Star Trek broadcast on American television. A prominent character in the program, Spock, has been seen by some as being autism-coded.

=== Comorbid conditions ===
What is today considered to be auditory processing disorder (APD) was first scientifically described by American otorhinolaryngology surgeon Samuel Joseph Kopetzky in 1948. His work was followed in 1954 by important papers by British otorhinolaryngology surgeon PF King and American psychologist Helmer Rudolph Myklebust. Some believe that APD is "one of the primary characteristic features of ASD", or that it is often comorbid.

Dysautonomia is now considered to include any disfunction of the autonomic nervous system. Such disfunction is more common in autistic people than the general population. The term "dysautonomia" was coined by American paediatricians Conrad Milton Riley and Richard Lawrence Day in 1949.

The term "dyspraxia" was coined by Spanish-French psychiatrist Julian de Ajuriaguerra and French psychologist Mira Stambak in 1964. It describes someone's difficulties with physical coordination and movement. This is said to affect up to 88% of people with autism.

American psychiatrist Peter Sifneos identified that some people without brain lesions experienced emotional agnosia in 1967, they not being able to recognise the emotions expressed by others.

Hyperlexia is when a child can read at an early age. This can be a symptom of autism, particularly when their reading ability is much better than their speaking ability. The term was coined by husband-and-wife American psychologists Norman E. Silberberg and Margaret C. Silberberg, and first published in September 1967.

=== Publications and media ===
==== Scientific papers ====
Dutch child psychiatrist Dirk van Krevelen published the paper "Een geval van 'early infantil autism'" (A case of early infantile autism) in 1952. It was the first European paper about "early infantile autism". In it, van Krevelen notes that while the condition is well known by United States child psychiatrists, it is virtually unknown in Europe.

1962 saw a number of notable scientific publications about autism published: In January, Charles Ferster and American psychiatrist Marian DeMyer published the paper "A method for the experimental analysis of the behavior of autistic children". This was possibly the first paper to show how behaviorism could be used to teach autistic students. Also in January, Dirk van Krevelen and Christine Kuipers published a paper in English regarding the work of Asperger, "The psychopathology of autistic psychopathy".

==== Books ====
In 1952, British psychiatrist Ronald Fairbairn published the paper "Schizoid Factors in the Personality" as part of a book.

In 1962, German psychiatrist Gerhard Bosch published the book Der Frühkindliche Autismus: Eine Klinische und Phänomenologisch-Anthropologische Untersuchung am Leitfaden der Sprache (Early Childhood Autism: A Clinical and Phenomenological-Anthropological Study Using Language as a Guide). Among other things, it briefly compared the work of Asperger and Kanner and suggested both men had described variants of the same condition. In 1965, Kanner said he had read this book.

American social worker, teacher and dramatist Viola Spolin released the book Improvisation for the Theater in 1963, based on her decades of experience teaching people how to more effectively communicate with each other.

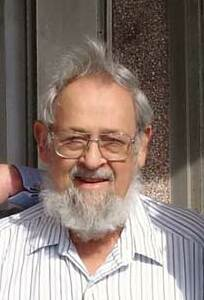
Bernard Rimland refuted the refrigerator mother theory and co-founded the Autism Society of America.

In 1964, Bernard Rimland published the book Infantile Autism: The Syndrome and Its Implications for a Neural Theory of Behavior, which refuted the refrigerator theory. Instead, Rimland suggested, autism was a result of biochemical defects "triggered by environmental assaults". It included a foreword by Leo Kanner. The book challenged the medical establishment's perceptions of autism. Rimland's message resonated with parents, who wanted to share their stories with him and ask for advice. (The book also includes a reference to "Asperger Syndrome".)

British psychiatrist John K Wing edited the first edition of Early Childhood Autism; Clinical, Educational and Social Aspects in 1966, which included chapters from both Ivar Lovaas and Lorna Wing.

Bettelheim countered Rimland's assertions about the causes of autism in his 1967 book Empty Fortress: Infantile Autism and the Birth of the Self. It greatly popularised the refrigerator theory. Bettelheim subsequently appeared multiple times on The Dick Cavett Show in the 70s to discuss theories of autism and psychoanalysis. (Refrigerator theory has since been refuted in the scientific literature, including a 2015 systematic review which showed absolutely no association between caregiver interaction and language outcomes in ASD patients.)

Another notable book of 1967 was The Siege: The First Eight Years of an Autistic Child by American teacher Clara Claiborne Park. It told the story of Clara's daughter and Clara's efforts to help her. (An updated version was released in 1982).

==== Magazines and news publications ====
Austrian-American psychologist Bruno Bettelheim at the University of Chicago published an article in 1959 in Scientific American, "Joey the Mechanical Boy", about a 9-year-old with autism.

=== Organizations ===
British teacher Sybil Elgar began a school for autistic children in the basement of her London home in 1962. Later that year Elgar, Lorna Wing and others established the UK's Society for Autistic Children. (It became known as the National Autistic Society in 1982.)

In 1963, the French autism association ASITP, later known as Sésame Autisme, was founded in Paris.

In 1963, the Council for Exceptional Children established the Association for Children with Learning Disabilities (now the Division on Autism and Developmental Disabilities). In 1966, the Association established the journal Education and Training of the Mentally Retarded.

In 1964, Autism SA was founded in South Australia.

In 1965, the group set up The Society School for Autistic Children, which was later named after Sybil Elgar. As of 2023, the society operates seven schools across England.

In 1965, the Leo Kanner Therapeutic Community was founded in Porto Alegre, Brazil.

In 1966, the Autistic Children's Association of New South Wales was founded in Australia. It later became known as Autism Spectrum Australia (Aspect).

In 1967, the organization now known as Amaze was founded in Victoria, Australia.

In 1967, the Autistic Children's Association of Queensland, later known as Autism Queensland, was founded in Australia.

In 1967, the Autism Association of Western Australia was founded.

In 1967, parents in Tokyo, Japan, formed the Association of Autistic Children's Parents.

In 1968, a national autism association was established in Japan.

Representative organisation Scottish Autism began in 1968, and continues independently today. (Autism Northern Ireland would follow in 1991.)

== Evidence grows (1968–1977) ==
In this period scientists found increasing evidence that autism was a distinct condition, and also found some of the factors that led to it.

=== Major contributors ===
==== Kanner's work in the 1970s ====
The Journal of Autism and Childhood Schizophrenia was established in January 1971, with Leo Kanner as the editor. This was the first scientific journal devoted to autism. Kanner wrote a paper called "Childhood psychosis: A historical overview" for the first issue. It acknowledges the work of a broader range of people than Kanner had previously, but not that of Asperger or Frankl; according to Dirk van Krevelen, Kanner and Asperger were mutually unaware of each other's work.

Another paper in the first edition however compares Kanner's syndrome (early infantile autism) with Asperger's syndrome (autistic psychosis). It also differentiates the two conditions through a list of seven differences. For the second edition, Kanner traced the eleven children in his 1943 paper and determined how they had grown up, but the results were inconclusive.

Kanner released the fourth and final edition of his textbook Child Psychiatry in 1972.

He edited the book Childhood Psychosis: Initial Studies and New Insights in 1973, and wrote three of its chapters. It reviewed 30 years of research into early infantile autism and childhood schizophrenia. In it he bemoaned the diagnosing of intellectually disabled children with a few autistic features as singularly having autism.

The "First International Leo Kanner Colloquium on Child Development, Deviations, and Treatment" was held in October 1973. The papers tabled were published in the academic book Psychopathology and child development: research and treatment in April 1976. Many of the papers were about autism. It was edited by German-American psychologist Eric Schopler and American psychiatrist Robert J. Reichler.

Kanner wrote additional papers about autism in the 1970s.

==== Anna Jean Ayres and sensory integration ====
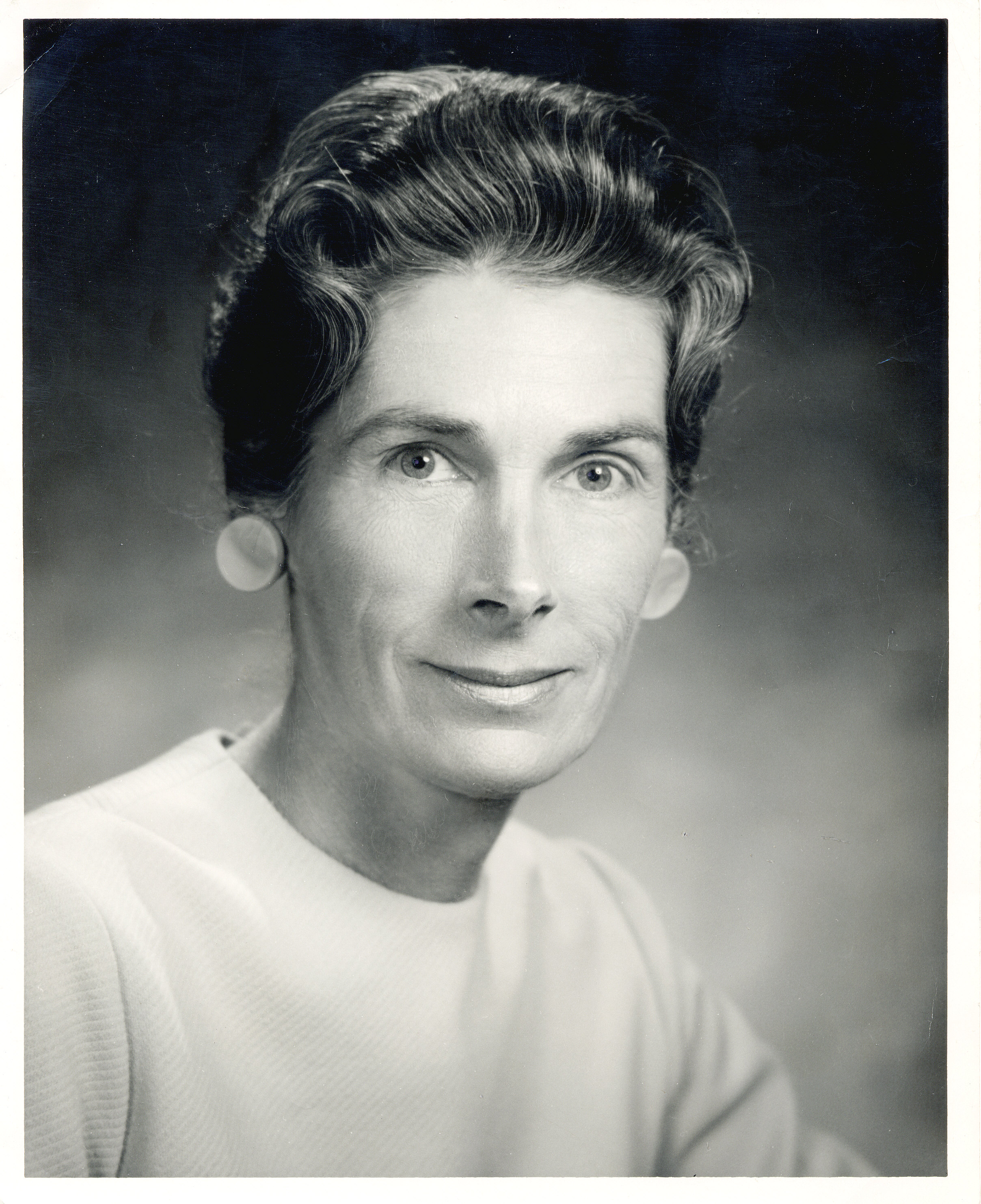
Anna Jean Ayres began sensory integration theory and therapy.

American occupational therapist Anna Jean Ayres began to study sensory integration (someone's organizing of their sensory stimuli) in the 1950s, publishing a number of papers over the coming decades. Ayres proposed that what is now called sensory processing disorder is linked to emotional regulation, learning, behaviour, and participation in daily life. This condition is recognised by some major occupational therapy bodies. The STAR Institute suggests that at least three-quarters of autistic children have significant symptoms of the disorder.

Ayres's 1972 book Sensory Integration and Learning Disorders launched her program of sensory integration therapy (SIT). America's CDC notes that this therapy is used with autistic people to "help improve responses to sensory input that may be restrictive or overwhelming."

=== Diagnostic classification ===
==== DSM-II ====
In the DSM-II, published in 1968, the concept of autism was used to describe the symptoms of three different conditions: childhood schizophrenia (295.8), withdrawing reaction of childhood (308.1), and schizoid personality (301.2). Compared to the DSM-I, the description of childhood schizophrenia was more detailed.

The edition also saw hyperkinetic reaction of childhood added to the typology. This condition later became known as attention deficit hyperactivity disorder (ADHD). Its symptoms were first described by German doctor Melchior Adam Weikard in 1775. The concept of child hyperactivity or hyperkinetic behaviour became established in the United States in the 1930s. Around 50-70% of people with ASD also have ADHD.

=== Early behavioural approaches to autism ===
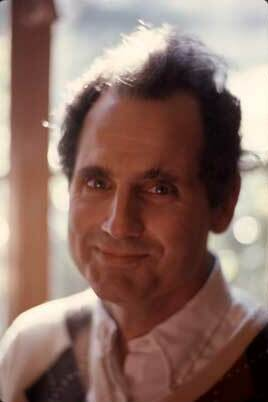
Charles Ferster used behavioural methods to teach speech to young autistic children.

Between 1957 and 1962, psychologist Charles Ferster began using a method called errorless learning to teach young autistic children how to speak.

In 1968, the first issue of the Journal of Applied Behavior Analysis set out the principles of applied behaviour analysis (ABA). This approach uses methods based on research about behaviour to change the types of behaviours which matter in daily life. Practitioners then measure whether the methods produce the intended changes.

In 1971, Matthew Israel founded the Behavior Research Institute in the United States. The institute later became the Judge Rotenberg Educational Center, which used electric shocks to punish and discourage certain behaviours. The centre used a device called the graduated electronic decelerator to deliver the shocks in response to behaviours such as self-injury and aggression.

=== Clinical research ===
Starting in the late 1960s, "autism" started to be considered as a separate syndrome from "schizophrenia".

British psychiatrist Michael Rutter's extensive research in the 1960s provided statistically robust evidence that the syndrome of "early infantile autism" existed. His most cited paper of the period was published in October 1968.

American psychiatrist Stella Chess conducted studies on the potential link between rubella and autism. In 1971, she found that children with congenital rubella syndrome developed autism at rates 200 times higher than the general population at the time. She followed this up with a 1977 study.

South African-British psychiatrist Israel Kolvin provided evidence that "early infantile autism" was a very different condition to later onset schizophrenia through two studies published in 1971.

American psychiatrist Susan Folstein and British psychiatrist Micheal Rutter published a significant twin study establishing the genetic basis of autism in September 1977.

=== Cognitive theories and concepts ===
Punding is the compulsive performance of repetitive tasks due to unusual dopamine regulation; which can include collecting or sorting objects or information. The term was first published by Swedish forensic psychiatrist Gösta Rylander in November 1968.

The term alexithymia was conceptualised by Peter Sifneos and fellow American psychiatrist John Case Nemiah in 1973. It refers to people having difficulties in understanding the emotions experienced by themselves or others. This is common in autistic people, but is not always the case. By the early 2000s it was found that about half of autistic people have at least some alexithymia traits.

Hungarian-American psychologist Mihaly Csikszentmihalyi's 1975 book Beyond Boredom and Anxiety: Experiencing Flow in Work and Games defined the newly coined concept of flow. Some believe this concept explains certain autistic traits.

In July 1977 Israeli psychologist David Navon published the first paper on global precedence (being able to "see the forest for the trees"). This built on earlier work on field dependence. It was later found that autistic children tend to have relatively weak global precedence, and that this correlated with a relatively weak ability to identify emotion and age in both humans and dogs.

Also in September that year, American linguist Ann Peters defined the "analytic" and "gestalt" language learning strategies. From 1982, American speech-language pathologist Barry Prizant argued that autistic people use the gestalt style more commonly than non-autistic people, and that this explained certain aspects of their unusual language use. This line of thinking was later developed by fellow American speech-language pathologist Marge Blanc.

=== Treatment approaches and social policy ===
The home-based autism treatment program Son-Rise, was developed by American couple Barry Kaufman and Samahria Kaufman in the early 1970s. Barry published a book on the method in 1976, (Son-Rise), claiming that it cured his son of autism. An American TV movie based on the book, Son-Rise: A Miracle of Love, was released in 1979. It was influential in Brazil, and was repeatedly aired there during the 1980s. In 1990, the BBC in the UK aired a documentary about one boy's treatment using the Son-Rise program, titled I Want My Little Boy Back, as part of the series Q.E.D.: Challenging Children.

The University of North Carolina's TEACCH Autism Program was founded by Eric Schopler in 1971, building on work started by Schopler and a colleague in 1964. It recognizes autism as a lifelong condition and does not aim to cure but to respond to autism as a culture.

In 1975, Canadian speech pathologist Ayala Hanen Manolson founded The Hanen Centre. Here she developed a new program for groups of parents whose children had significant language delays, known as the "Hanen Approach". Previously, speech pathology was largely delivered by professional pathologists - this approach trained parents to provide the same guidance to children. Over decades, this approach further developed into programs such as More Than Words and Talkability.

Also in 1975, the first sensory room was constructed by the Netherlanders Ad Verheul (occupational therapist) and Jan Hulsegge (music therapist).

In November 1975, two British organisations, the Union of the Physically Impaired Against Segregation and the Disability Alliance, held a discussion about the "fundamental principles of disability". The published summary of that discussion advanced a new definition of disability. "In our view, it is society which disables physically impaired people. Disability is something imposed on top of our impairments, by the way we are unnecessarily isolated and excluded from full participation in society." This sentiment later became the basis of the social model of disability, and was important in disability self-advocacy.

=== Public awareness and cultural representation ===
In 1970, NSAC launched an ongoing national autism awareness campaign. In 1972, it started the first National Autistic Children's week, which later evolved into Autism Awareness Month.

=== Publications and media ===
Gerhard Bosch's 1962 book Infantile autism: a clinical and phenomenological-anthropological investigation taking language as the guide was translated into English in 1970. It used the term Asperger's syndrome to describe the symptoms of Asperger's patients.

In April 1968, Asperger wrote about the similarities and differences of his and Kanner's concepts of autism in the paper "Zur Differentialdiagnose des kindlichen Autismus" Leo Kanner republished a copy of his 1934 paper in the same journal edition.

British researcher Lorna Wing of the Institute of Psychiatry, London published the book Autistic children - a guide for parents in 1971. Louise Despert endorsed the book, and provided its forewords.

In 1972, German-American Wolf Wolfensberger released his book Normalisation. It advocated that society should provide opportunities to people with disabilities so that they can do what people without those disabilities can do.

In 1975, American-British psychologist Donald Meltzer released his book Explorations in Autism: a psychoanalytic study, documenting the treatment of childhood autism following the thinking of Melanie Klein.

Asperger gave a lecture in Fribourg in 1977, of which a translation in English titled "Problems of Infantile Autism" was published in 1979.

=== Organizations ===
In 1970, parents founded the Italian Association for Assistance to Autistic Children (AIABA) in Italy. The organization now known as Autismus Deutschland (Autism Germany) was also founded that year.

Division 33 of the American Psychological Association was established in 1973, bringing together American psychologists interested in "Mental Retardation and Developmental Disabilities", including autism. As of 2023, the group covers "Intellectual and Developmental Disabilities/Autism Spectrum Disorder" (IDD/ASD).

In 1973, Autism Sverige (Autism Sweden) was founded in Sweden. In Canada, parents founded the Ontario Society for Autistic Children, later known as Autism Ontario.

In 1974, the Israeli Society for Children and Adults with Autism (ALUT) was founded.

In January 1975, Autismus Deutsche Schweiz was founded in German-speaking Switzerland.

In 1976, Autism Society Canada was established. In Spain, APAFAC, an association for parents of autistic children, was founded in Catalonia.

In 1979, Aspanaes was founded in Galicia, Spain.

== Formal recognition (1978–1993) ==
Autism became recognized as a developmental disorder distinct from schizophrenia for the first time by a major psychiatric body, the WHO, in 1978. This and the APA's adoption of a similar definition in 1980, was a major milestone in enabling research into autism.

=== Major contributors ===
==== Lorna Wing ====
In March 1979, British psychiatrist Lorna Wing and British psychologist Judith Gould published a study of children under 15 in one area of London . They looked at how the children interacted with other people, how they used language, and whether they repeated the same actions or activities. Difficulties with social interaction and language often occurred alongside repetitive behaviour, including in children who fell outside earlier descriptions of childhood autism. Their study helped lay the groundwork for the idea of an autism spectrum and for what later became known as the "triad of impairments", a framework focussing on social interaction, communication and imagination.

In February 1981, Wing published "Asperger's Syndrome: A Clinical Account". The paper brought the work of Austrian pediatrician Hans Asperger to wider attention among clinicians. Wing summarized his account and included six examples drawn from children and adults she had seen herself. She also questioned two of his observations. Some of the children she saw took longer to start talking, even though they later developed large vocabularies. She also questioned how often people showed the creativity and originality that Asperger had described in their areas of special interest. Wing argued that Asperger's syndrome and early childhood autism belonged in a wider group of related conditions.

Wing pointed out that the traits she associated with Asperger's syndrome also occurred, to varying degrees, in the wider population. She thought a diagnosis could make sense when those traits caused substantial difficulties in daily life. She also saw similarities with what clinicians called "schizoid personality". These included an intense focus on a narrow range of things, unusual ways of communicating, social isolation, heightened sensitivity, and what she described as a lack of empathy. She questioned whether it was useful to put the two in the same category.

In October 1981, Wing published a separate study comparing the numbers of boys and girls with early childhood autism and related conditions. Among children who had difficulties with both language and social interaction, there were about 2.6 boys for every girl. The gap was wider among children who scored higher on intelligence tests and among those whose early development fit what clinicians then considered typical childhood autism.

=== Diagnostic classification ===
==== ICD-9 ====
The international medical condition classification system, the ICD, greatly changed the way it categorised autism-related conditions in 1978, with the release of the ICD-9. "Infantile autism" (299.0) was now recognised as a condition, with separate sub-categories for it having a "current or active state" or "residual state". Its definition of this condition was based on the criteria devised by Mildred Creak for "childhood schizophrenia" in the early 1960s.

In the category of "disturbance of emotions specific to childhood and adolescence", the ICD now included "sensitivity, shyness and social withdrawal disorder" (313.2), which included the subcategories "shyness disorder of childhood", "introverted disorder of childhood" and "elective mutism". "Schizoid personality disorder" (301.2) now had two varieties, a general one, and "introverted personality".

==== DSM-III ====
The DSM-III (1980) turned what was previously defined as childhood schizophrenia into three kinds of "pervasive developmental disorder" (PDD). "Infantile autism" began before a child was 30 months old, and "childhood onset pervasive developmental disorder" began between 30 months and 12 years. A third variety, "atypical pervasive developmental disorder" was similar but lesser than the other two, and could begin at any time.

This defining of PDD was greatly influenced by Michael Rutter and the NSAC.

"Schizoid personality" in adults was split into "schizoid personality disorder", "avoidant personality disorder" and "schizotypal personality disorder". The first two differed by the motivation of the diagnosed person - "avoidant" people had social difficulties but wanted to be social, while "schizoid" people had social difficulties and were happy to stay that way.

==== DSM-III-R ====
In 1987, the revised DSM-III-R was released. In this edition of the DSM, "infantile autism" was merged with "childhood onset pervasive developmental disorder" to create the new "autistic disorder". The new definition broadened the range of neurotypes that were considered "autistic" by clinicians. The DSM's third PDD category became "pervasive developmental disorder not otherwise specified" (PDDNOS, later PDD-NOS).

Another newly added condition was stereotypy/habit disorder, which involved "intentional, repetitive, non-functional behaviors". However, the DSM-III-R noted that: "Stereotypy/Habit Disorder should not be diagnosed if the behaviour occurs in the context of a Pervasive Developmental Disorder." The condition would later be renamed stereotypic movement disorder, and would be considered to be experienced by a high proportion of autistic people.

The autism and PDD-NOS definitions of the DSM-III-R were created from a draft written by American psycholinguist Lynn Waterhouse and British psychiatrist Lorna Wing, and a team led by them and also American psychiatrists Robert Spitzer and Bryna Siegel.

=== Cognitive theories and concepts ===
The term "infodumping" was first used in 1978.

Thshele term "sensorimotor gating" was first used in print in July 1978 to describe a brain's ability to subconsciously filter out low-relevancy sensory information, in a paper by a team led by American psychiatrist David Braff. This term later developed into "sensory gating". Autistic differences in sensory gating lead to more common cases of sensory overload than for neurotypical people. (This in turn often leads to stimming, meltdowns and autistic burnout). It can also lead to sensory underload, (which also can lead to stimming).

The concept of hysteroid dysphoria was defined in print by American psychiatrists Michael Liebowitz and Donald F. Klein in December 1979. It described people who often have a strong negative reaction to perceived rejection by someone else. Klein later renamed the condition rejection sensitivity disorder. It is now typically called rejection sensitive dysphoria. (German-American psychiatrist Karen Horney had earlier written about rejection sensitivity in 1937).

In 1983, Swiss-American neurologist Isabelle Rapin and psycholinguist Doris A Allen coined the term semantic pragmatic disorder to describe the communicative behaviour of children who presented traits such as pathological talkativeness, deficient access to vocabulary and discourse comprehension, atypical choice of terms and inappropriate conversational skills. They referred to a group of children who presented with mild autistic features and specific semantic pragmatic language problems. (In the late 1990s, the term "pragmatic language impairment" (PLI) was proposed to cover this situation.)

The term "theory of mind" (an ability to attribute mental states to oneself and others) was first applied to autism by the psychologists Simon Baron-Cohen (British), Alan M Leslie (Scottish) and Uta Frith (German-British) in October 1985.

The 1985 book, The Interpersonal World of the Infant (written by American psychiatrist Daniel Stern), gave a new definition to the word "attunement". Here it referred to the emotional synchronisation created between a caregiver and a child when the two share an emotional state. The term would be come to be used more broadly to refer to any such synchronisation between two people. Some autistic people do this more than is typical, for which psychologists Michelle Garnett (Australian) and Tony Attwood (British-Australian) coined the term "empathic attunement".

Multiplex developmental disorder was conceptualised by American researchers Donald J. Cohen (psychiatrist), Rhea Paul (speech pathologist) and Fred Volkmar (psychiatrist) in March 1986.

The modern concept of cognitive load was defined by Australian psychologist John Sweller in an April 1988 paper.

Uta Frith's 1989 book Autism: Explaining the Enigma posited the weak central coherence theory of autism. It proposes that autistic people typically think about things in the smallest possible parts. It argues that autistic people perceive details better than non-autistic people, but "cannot see the wood for the trees."

1989 also saw Hungarian-British psychologist Peter Fonagy give a new meaning to the word "mentalisation", casting it as a synonym for "theory of mind". British psychiatrist Anthony Bateman and Fonagy would subsequently develop mentalisation-based treatment. This has been used to help autistic people improve their use of theory of mind.

Mind-blindness is a term first published in early 1990 by Simon Baron-Cohen. It refers to the idea that "autistic people are impaired in their ability to attribute mental states (such as beliefs, knowledge states, etc.) to themselves and other people". This is otherwise known as an impaired theory of mind (ToM). Baron-Cohen believed that a lack of ability to read eyes was a particularly important deficit, and developed a training program to develop this. It is now thought that all autistic people have some ToM ability. Baron-Cohen's book Mindblindness: An Essay on Autism and Theory of Mind was released in 1995.

In September 1992, British psychiatrist Patrick Bolton and his colleagues introduced the concept of the "broader autistic phenotype" (BAP) to refer to family members of people diagnosed with autism who had some autistic traits, but not enough to themselves be considered autistic.

=== Clinical research and theories ===
A controversial claim suggested that watching extensive amounts of television may cause autism. This hypothesis was largely based on research suggesting that the increasing rates of autism in the 1970s and 1980s were linked to the growth of cable television at the time.

Autism was first diagnosed in the People's Republic of China in 1982 by Professor Tao Guotai (陶国泰) from the Nanjing Brain Hospital. He presented the case in a Chinese journal. In the late 1980s, he introduced his findings to the global audience in English.

In September 1985, Felix F. de la Cruz outlined extensively the physical, psychological, and cytogenetic characteristics of people with Fragile X syndrome in addition to their prospects for therapy.

The 1985 book Biology of the Autistic Syndromes proposed that autism was a syndrome with multiple biological etiologies. It was written by American neurologist Mary Coleman and Swedish psychiatrist Christopher Gillberg.

Autism found its way into the Finnish disease classification in 1987. (It was only in 1996 that it was finally removed from the category of psychosis in the Finnish version of the ICD-10.)

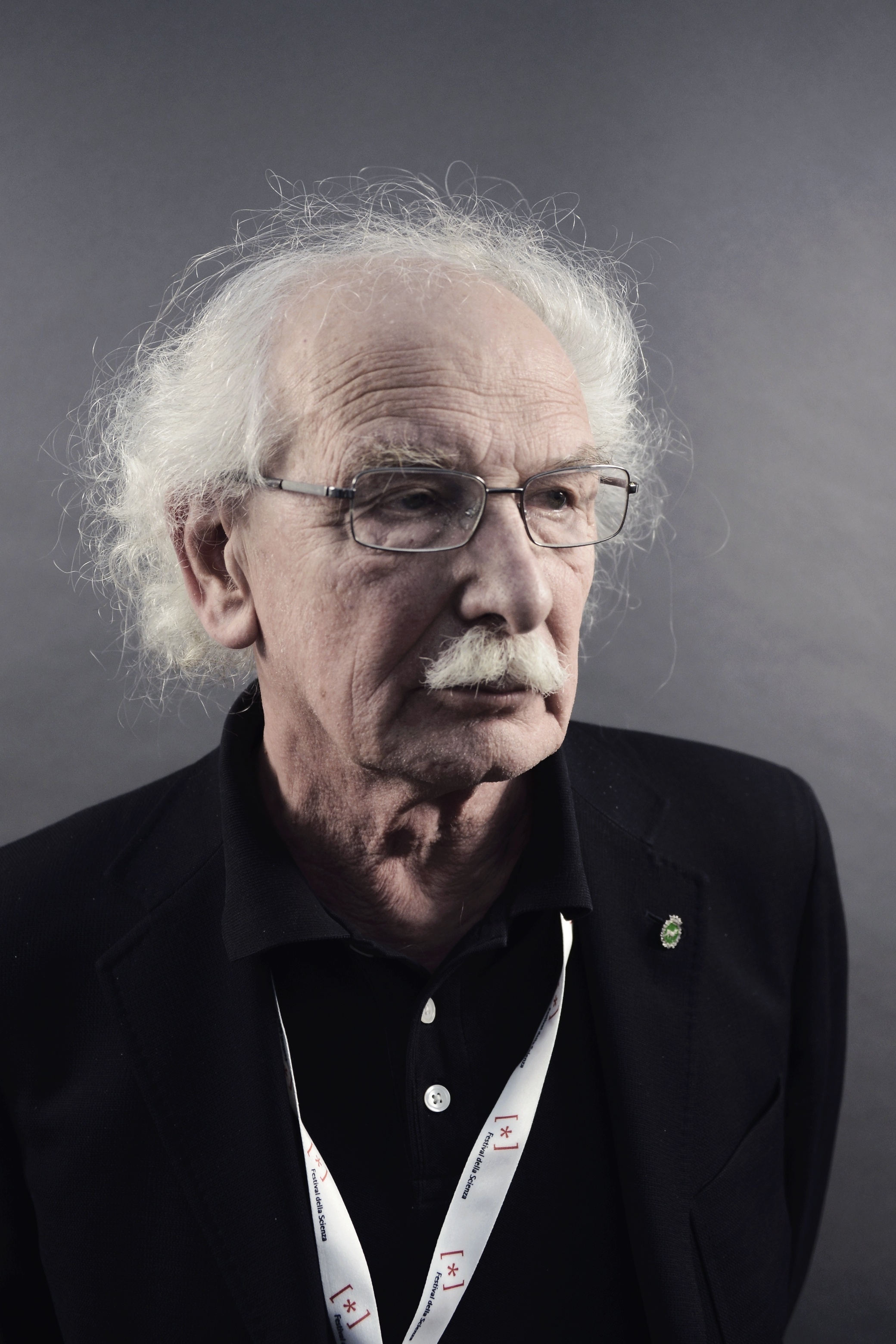
Giacomo Rizzolatti led the team that discovered mirror neurons.

Researchers Giacomo Rizzolatti, Giuseppe Di Pellegrino, Luciano Fadiga, Leonardo Fogassi, and Vittorio Gallese at the University of Parma published a paper announcing the existence of mirror neurons in 1992. They found that when a monkey watches another monkey doing something, specialised neurons in the first monkey's brain fire in a way that mirrors the firing of the neurons in the acting monkey. The same scientists later found the same thing in human brains.

It has been proposed that differences in the mirror neuron system could in part explain differences between autistic and neurotypical people. A well-cited study in 2006 by American psychiatrist Mirella Dapretto and others found such a connection.

Later research, however, did not support this connection.

=== Treatment approaches and social policy ===
American animal behaviourist Temple Grandin invented the squeeze machine to therapeutically apply deep-touch pressure to herself in 1965. She was inspired by squeeze chutes used with livestock. She did further research with the device with adults and children and in March 1992 published a noted paper about it.

Various deep touch pressure techniques were in common use with autistic people by American occupational therapists by 1980.

The first consumer noise-cancelling headphones were released by Japanese electronics company Sony in 1992. This kind of headphone can help autistic people avoid sensory overload.

The opioid excess theory of autism was proposed by Estonian-American neuroscientist Jaak Panksepp in a 1979 paper. The possibility of a related relationship between autism and the consumption of gluten and casein was first articulated by Norwegian medical researcher Kalle Reichelt in 1991. This work led to the use of a gluten-free, casein-free diet (GFCF) to treat autism symptoms. (A 2008 Cochrane Review found that "Current evidence for efficacy of these diets is poor".)

The "developmental, individual-difference, relationship-based model" (DIR) of autism diagnosis and treatment was developed by American psychiatrist Stanley Greenspan in 1979.

In a February 1981 publication, Lorna Wing noted that although she believed there was currently no treatment for autism, "handicaps can be diminished by appropriate management and education" and that "techniques of behaviour modification used with autistic children can possibly be helpful if applied with sensitivity".

The LEAP (Learning Experiences - An Alternative Program for Preschoolers and Parents) curriculum model was developed by American psychologist Phillip Strain of the University of Pittsburgh in 1981. The first paper explaining it was published in 1984. The program has autistic and non-autistic pre-schoolers share a classroom, with the latter assisting the former. It is considered a more-cognitive rather than a more-behaviourist form of teaching. It is also considered one of the best researched forms of training for autistic pre-schoolers.

In the late 1980s, the field of Developmental Education developed at the Sturt campus of SACAE in Adelaide, Australia. It brought together the concept of "normalisation" from the social model of disability with ideas from ABA. Developmental Education aims to teach life skills to disabled people who need them. The Autism CRC believes practitioners may be of help to autistic children and their families.

Social skill teaching method, Social Stories, began its development in 1989 by American teacher Carol Gray. She published her first paper on it in April 1993, also publishing the first book about it that year. A survey of Ontario autism support workers in 2011 found that 58% had support programs influenced by her.

In 1983, British disability scholar Mike Oliver coined the term "social model of disability". The model locates disability in barriers that society creates, such as inaccessible environments and exclusion.

The Minspeak image-based language was first implemented on a computer in 1981. It was developed by American linguist Bruce R Baker.

The Picture Exchange Communication System (PECS) was developed in 1985 at the Delaware Autism Program by Andy Bondy and Lori Frost.

French ear, nose and throat specialist Guy Bérard announced auditory integration training (AIT) to the world through a 1982 book. Annabel Stehli's 1991 book The Sound of a Miracle told the story of her autistic daughter's treatment by with this training. Bérard's book was translated into English in 1993. By 1994, over 10,000 US children and adults had received AIT. Later larger and better controlled studies failed to bear out the promise of AIT, and its use is now discouraged by significant bodies. (A 2004 Cochrane Review found that there was no evidence that AIT and similar therapies were effective treatments for autism, and this was reaffirmed by a 2011 update.)

=== New diagnostic tools ===
The Childhood Autism Rating Scale (CARS) was released in March 1980 by Americans Eric Schopler, Robert Jay Reichler, Robert F DeVellis and Kenneth Daly.

The WHO/DAS was first published by WHO in 1988. Rather than specifically assessing autism, it measured an individual's social disability from all psychiatric causes. It was mainly used with psychiatric inpatients. The development team was led by Bulgarian-Swiss psychiatrist Assen Jablensky.

The Autism Diagnostic Observation Schedule (ADOS) was developed in 1989 by Catherine Lord, Michael Rutter, Susan Goode, Jacquelyn Heemsbergen, Heather Jordan, Lynn Mawhood and Eric Schopler. This was revised to become the ADOS-G in 2000, by a team including Andrew Pickles. The schedule became commercially available in 2001.

The Autism Diagnostic Interview (ADI) was also developed in 1989, by Ann Le Couteur, Michael Rutter, Catherine Lord, Patricia Rios, Sarah Robertson, Mary Holdgrafer and John McLennan.

The Checklist for Autism in Toddlers (CHAT), a tool for diagnosing autism in children aged 18–24 months, was first published in December 1992 by Simon Baron-Cohen, Jane Allen and Christopher Gillberg. Simon Baron-Cohen and others also developed another test for autism in 18-month-olds, which was published in February 1996.

=== Applied behaviour analysis ===
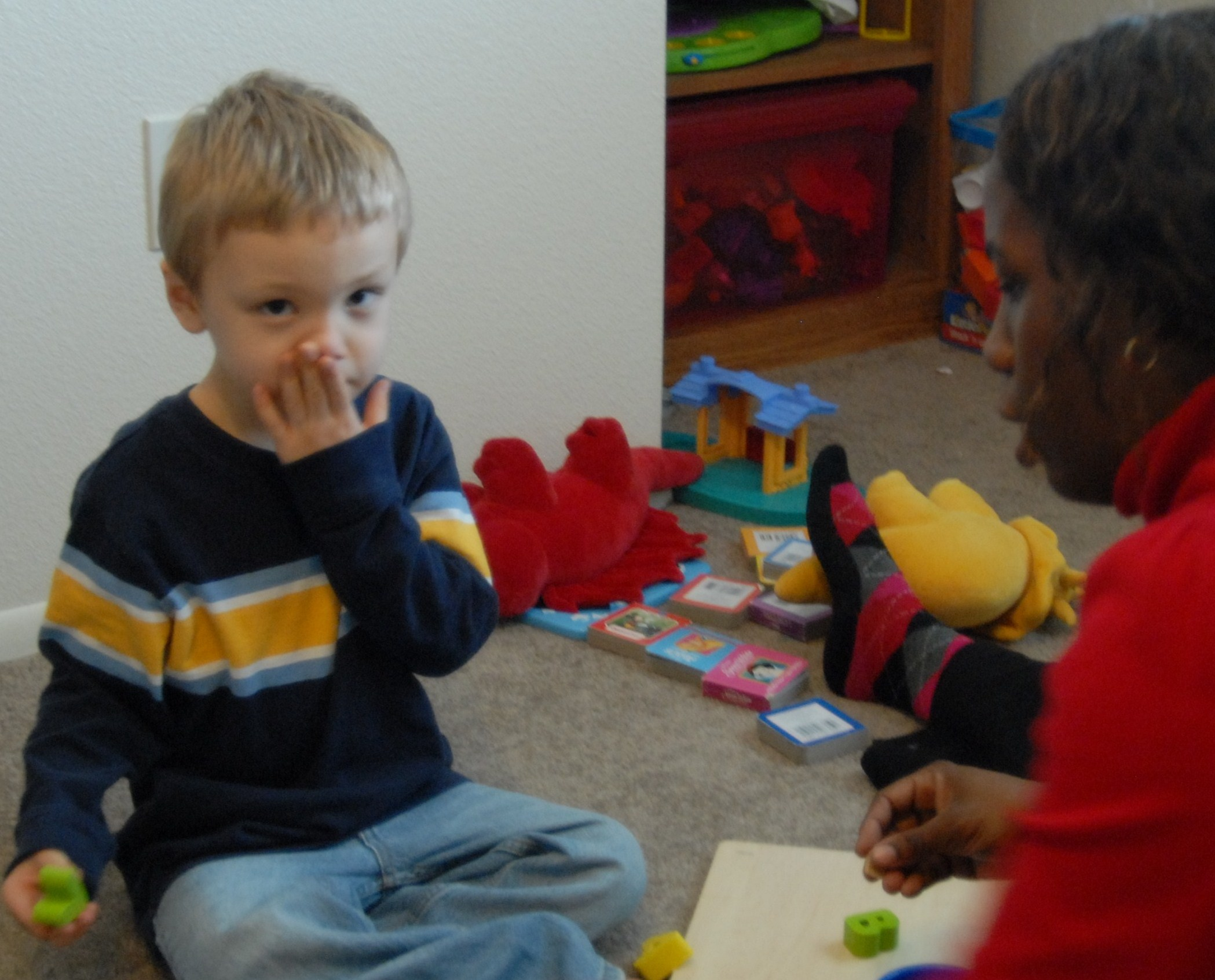
An autistic boy receiving ABA therapy.

The Early Start Denver Model of autism treatment for young children was developed in 1981 by American psychologists Sally J Rogers and Geraldine Dawson. It was initially called the "play school model", because its main actions happened during children's play.

Positive behaviour support (PBS, PBIS, SWPBS or SWPBIS) emerged from the University of Oregon in the mid-1980s. It is a type of ABA that is typically used in schools. Tim Lewis is a noted practitioner of the concept, and is often credited as a co-founder. The Association for Positive Behaviour Support was founded in 2003.

Pivotal response treatment (PRT) was pioneered by Americans Robert Koegel, Mary O'Dell and Lynn Kern Koegel in 1987. It is a "naturalistic" form of ABA used with young children. PRT aims to teach a few "pivotal skills", that will help the student learn many other skills. Initiating communication with others is deemed one such pivotal skill.

Ivar Lovaas released a major report on the decades established UCLA Young Autism Project in 1987, defining a new method of ABA. Lovaas controversially reported that half his pre-school patients that received intensive therapy now had an IQ level equal to their non-autistic peers, and had "recovered" from their autism. It is sometimes called the "Lovaas method/model/program" and sometimes the "UCLA model/intervention". It has become the primary form of Early Intensive Behavior Intervention (EIBI), and now is often referred to by that name as well. One methodology it developed was discrete trial training, which has become a well-used ABA technique.

The commonly used textbook Applied Behavior Analysis was first released by American educationalists John O Cooper, Timothy E Heron, and William Lee Heward at Ohio State University in 1987.

=== Public awareness and cultural representation ===
The US congress endorsed Autism Awareness Month in 1984.

The first International Conference on Autism was held in Toronto, Canada, in July 1993. It was organised by the Autism Society of America and Autism Society Canada. 2300 delegates from 47 countries attended.

Public awareness of autism greatly increased with the release of the movie Rain Man.

=== Cognitive theories and concepts ===
Another 1985 book, The Interpersonal World of the Infant (written by American psychiatrist Daniel Stern), gave a new definition to the word "attunement". Here it referred to the emotional synchronisation created between a caregiver and a child when the two share an emotional state. The term would be come to be used more broadly to refer to any such synchronisation between two people. Some autistic people do this more than is typical, for which psychologists Michelle Garnett (Australian) and Tony Attwood (British-Australian) coined the term "empathic attunement".

Uta Frith's 1989 well-cited book Autism: Explaining the Enigma posited the weak central coherence theory of autism. It proposes that autistic people typically think about things in the smallest possible parts. It argues that autistic people perceive details better than non-autistic people, but "cannot see the wood for the trees."

Mind-blindness is a term first published in early 1990 by Simon Baron-Cohen. It refers to the idea that "autistic people are impaired in their ability to attribute mental states (such as beliefs, knowledge states, etc.) to themselves and other people". This is otherwise known as an impaired theory of mind (ToM). Baron-Cohen believed that a lack of ability to read eyes was a particularly important deficit, and developed a training program to develop this. It is now thought that all autistic people have some ToM ability. Baron-Cohen's book Mindblindness: An Essay on Autism and Theory of Mind was released in 1995.

=== Early autistic self-advocacy ===
In the late 1980s, American autistic activist Jim Sinclair was an early advocate of the autism rights position that opposed efforts to cure autism. In 1992, Sinclair co-founded Autism Network International with fellow autistic activists Kathy Grant and Donna Williams.

=== Publications and media ===
==== Scientific papers ====
In 1981, Jakob Lutz published the paper "Hans Asperger und Leo Kanner zum Gedenken" (Hans Asperger and Leo Kanner in memoriam).

==== Books ====
One chapter of British neurologist Oliver Sacks' 1985 book The Man Who Mistook His Wife for a Hat featured an autistic savant.

Academic book Educating and understanding autistic children was edited by Americans Robert L. Koegel (psychiatrist), Arnold Rincover (psychologist) and Andrew L. Egel (educationalist), and released in 1983.

The Handbook of autism and pervasive developmental disorders is an academic book about autism that was first released in 1987. The first edition was edited by Americans Donald J. Cohen, Anne M. Donnellan (educational psychologist) and Rhea Paul. New editions were published in 1997, 2005 and 2014. Additional editors have included Fred Volkmar (American psychiatrist), Ami Klin (multinational psychologist), Sally J. Rogers (American psychologist) and Kevin A. Pelphrey (American neuroscientist).

The book Children with autism: a parents' guide was also released in 1989. It was edited by American psychologist Michael D. Powers. A second edition was published in 2000. The similar Asperger's syndrome and your child: a parents' guide was released in 2002.

Asperger's early papers were first published in English in 1991, as part of the book Autism and Asperger Syndrome. They were translated by the book's editor, Uta Frith. This further increased awareness of Asperger's work, and of the concept of "Asperger syndrome".

The Autistic Spectrum: A Guide for Parents and Professionals was released by Lorna Wing in 1996.

1998 sensory processing guide The Out-of-Sync Child was published by American music and movement teacher Carol Stock Kranowitz.

The Introvert Advantage: How to Thrive in an Extrovert World was released by American psychologist Marti Olsen Laney in February 2002.

August 2002 saw the publishing of Freaks, Geeks, and Asperger Syndrome: A User Guide to Adolescence by 13-year-old British adolescent with Asperger syndrome, Luke Jackson. In January 2004, Luke and his family featured in the BBC documentary feature My Family and Autism. In 2005, a fictional movie based on the family, Magnificent 7, was aired on the BBC.

Another book first published in August 2002 was A Parent's Guide to Asperger Syndrome and High-Functioning Autism by American psychologist Sally Ozonoff. A second edition, A Parent's Guide to High-Functioning Autism Spectrum Disorder: How to Meet the Challenges and Help Your Child Thrive, was published in 2014 by Ozonoff and fellow American psychologists, Geraldine Dawson and James C. McPartland.

Raising a Sensory Smart Child was first released in March 2005 by two Americans, the occupational therapist Lindsey Biel and the writer Nancy Peske. New editions were released in 2009 and 2018.

Ten Things Every Child with Autism Wishes You Knew was first published by American speech therapist Ellen Notbohm in 2005.

ABA book The Verbal Behavior Approach: How to Teach Children With Autism and Related Disorders was released in May 2007 by two Americans, nurse Mary Barbera and writer Tracy Rasmussen.

Smart but Scattered: The Revolutionary "Executive Skills" Approach to Helping Kids Reach Their Potential was released in January 2009.

Disconnected Kids was released by American neurologist Robert Melillo in January 2009.

Emotional control guidebook Zones of Regulation was published by American occupational therapist Leah Kuypers in 2011, to help autistic people and others who needed it.

Understanding Your Child's Sensory Signals: A Practical Daily Use Handbook for Parents and Teachers was released in September 2011 by American occupational therapist Angie Voss.

The Survival Guide for Kids with Autism Spectrum Disorders (And Their Parents) was released in March 2012 by Americans Elizabeth Verdick (a writer) and Elizabeth Reeve (a psychiatrist). A new edition was released in 2021.

Denver Early Start Model book, An Early Start for Your Child with Autism: Using Everyday Activities to Help Kids Connect, Communicate, and Learn was released by Americans Sally J. Rogers, Geraldine Dawson and Laurie A. Vismara

==== Film and television ====
British architectural illustrator (and autistic savant) Stephen Wiltshire first came to prominence in the UK through his February 1987 appearance on an episode of QED about savants.

American movie Rain Man was released in 1988. Its titular character was an autistic man with savant abilities. Bernard Rimland was consulted on how the character was portrayed. The movie did much to define public understanding of the condition.

==== Software ====
The software program The Social Express was first released in November 2011, by American parents of autistic children Marc Zimmerman and Tina Zimmerman.

=== Organizations ===
The Nederlandse Vereniging voor Autisme (NVA) (Dutch Association for Autism) was founded in 1978 by parents of children with autism.

The Sensory Processing Disorder Foundation was founded in America in 1979 by occupational therapist Lucy Jane Miller. It is now known as the STAR Institute.

Domus Instituto de Autismo was established in Mexico in May 1980 by parents of children with autism.

The Autism Society of Taiwan (中華民國自閉症總會) was founded in January 1985.

Eleven mothers of autistic children in the Philippines held a gathering in 1987. In March 1989, they and others founded the Autistic Children and Adults of the Philippines (ACAP) Foundation. The group became the country's predominant autism organisation. It is now known as Autism Society Philippines.

A new national French autism organisation, Autisme France, was founded in February 1989.

Representative organisation Autism South Africa (A;SA) was founded in 1989 by concerned parents and professionals.

In Saudi Arabia, the Saudi Autistic Society (الجمعية السعودية الخيرية للتوح) was founded in January 1990.

In India, Action for Autism (AFA) began in 1991 as a parent support group.

In 1993, Tian Huiping founded the Beijing Stars and Rain Education Institute for Autism, China's first nongovernmental organisation dedicated to educating and supporting autistic children.

In Turkey, a support group for parents of children with autism began in 1991. It reformed as the Turkish Autistic Support and Education Foundation Türkiye Otistiklere Destek ve Eğitim Vakfı (TODEV) in 1997.

== Asperger syndrome recognised (1994–2012) ==
=== Diagnostic classification ===
==== ICD-10 ====
The ICD-10 was first published in 1992, for use beginning in 1994. It made a number of changes to its categorisation of autism-related conditions.

==== DSM-IV: autistic disorder, Asperger disorder and other conditions ====
In 1994, reflecting the better understood diversity of autistic experience, the DSM-IV included a number of newly defined PDD conditions. "Autistic disorder" was redefined, and supplemented with the new conditions Asperger's disorder, Rett disorder and childhood disintegrative disorder (CDD). PDD-NOS remained.

This edition also saw the defining of developmental coordination disorder (DCD), a condition featuring "a marked impairment in the development of motor coordination". The DSM acknowledged that these symptoms were common in people with PDDs, and excluded such people from being diagnosed with DCD. In October 1994, the International Consensus Meeting on Children and Clumsiness adopted the concept of DCD, choosing to use it in place of earlier descriptions of child clumsiness.

Psychiatrists David Shaffer (multinational) and Magda Campbell (Yugoslav-American) led the edition's Infancy, Child, and Adolescent Disorder Working Party, which was established in May 1988. Shaffer later noted that at this time "It was not clear from the literature, however, whether Asperger's was a distinct disorder or a mild variant of autism."

A field trial led by American psychiatrist Fred Volkmar heavily influenced the autism section in the DSM-IV. The group decided to base their definition of the condition on the then current ICD-10 draft, also taking influence from the DSM-III. Volkmar considered himself the "lead author" of the autism definition.

==== DSM-IV TR ====
The DSM-IV TR (2000) contained an almost complete rewrite of the description of Asperger's disorder, without changing it's formal definition at all. These changes were led by American psychiatrists Michael First and Harold Alan Pincus.

=== Treatment approaches and social policy ===
The atypical antipsychotic drug risperidone was approved in the United States for treating autism-associated aggressive and self-injurious behaviours in October 2006. (A 2007 Cochrane Review found that it can be beneficial for "some features of autism".) The similar but less problematic drug aripiprazole was approved in 2009. (A 2012 Cochrane Review (reinforced in 2016) found that it could help stabilise children's behaviour).

Russian-British doctor Natasha Campbell-McBride introduced the GAPS diet for helping people with autism and other conditions through the book Gut and Psychology Syndrome in 2004. Claims of the diet's usefulness for children with autism are not supported by scientific studies. Harriet Hall has described the GAPS diet as "a mishmash of half-truths, pseudoscience, imagination, and untested claims", and Quackwatch includes the GAPS Diet in its Index of questionable treatments.

Two Cochrane Reviews in late 2011 found that there was no high quality evidence that acupuncture or Omega-3 fatty acid were effective treatments for autism. A March 2012 Review found that further research was required before tricyclic antidepressants could be recommended to treat ASD in children. An April 2012 review found there was no evidence for the efficacy of secretin injections for treating autism.

A July 2012 Cochrane Review found that there was some evidence that social skills groups could help some autistic children and adolescents.

American speech therapist Michelle Garcia Winner began to develop the Social Thinking Methodology in the mid-1990s, and established the Social Thinking company shortly afterwards. The organisation has subsequently developed a wide range of resources for teaching social skills to autistic people. Winner's works were a substantial influence on Ontario autism support workers in 2011.

The developmental social-pragmatic (DSP) model of autism teaching emerged in the late 1990s. It aims to work with and strengthen autistic children's desires to successfully communicate (as well as their ability to), with parents and teachers conversing with children in as non-contrived ways as possible.

Husband-and-wife Americans, advertising producer Keith Zivalich and seamstress Lynda Zivalich, produced the first weighted blanket in 1997. They first sold them in December 1998.

An April 2002 Cochrane Review found that "no recommendation can be advanced regarding the use of B6‐Mg as a treatment for autism." This finding was reinforced by an update in October 2005.

Relationship Development Intervention (RDI) was developed by American husband-and-wife psychologists Steven Gutstein and Rachelle Sheely in the 1990s. It aims to increase a young child's desire and ability to be social.

Fred Frankel and Robert Myatt developed the Children's Friendship Training (CFT) model over two decades at UCLA, publishing a book on it in 2002.

The SCERTS Model: A Comprehensive Educational Approach for Children with Autism Spectrum Disorders was published in June 2004 by five American authors. The model covers children's social communication (SC), emotional regulation (ER), and transactional support (TS).

Tony Attwood released the program Exploring Feelings: Cognitive Behaviour Therapy to Manage Anxiety in 2004. It is recommended for use with autistic children by the ASHA.

"Paediatric Autism Communication Therapy" (PACT), a technique for teaching parents of young autistic children how to better communicate with them, was first released through a paper in November 2004. It was written by three British researchers, speech therapist Catherine Aldred, psychiatrist Jonathan Green, and speech therapist Catherine Adams.

Simon Baron-Cohen and others released an animated series for autistic pre-schoolers called The Transporters in 2006. Its creators claimed that autistic children could learn to read facial emotions as well as non-autistic children after repeated viewing, addressing their social-emotional agnosia and alexithymia. The series was nominated for a BAFTA. The British-voiced version of the series is available for free under a Creative Commons licence. The episodes have been translated into a number of languages, and complimentary training material has also been developed.

The UK's Autism Act 2009 came into force in January 2010, which required the government to create a fully-funded "autism strategy" for "meeting the needs of adults in England with autistic spectrum conditions." Subsequent multi-year strategies were created, so far covering until 2026.

The Program for the Education and Enrichment of Relational Skills (PEERS) was developed by Americans Elizabeth Laugeson and Fred Frankel in 2010, drawing on Frankel's earlier CFT work. Laugeson later established the UCLA PEERS Clinic.

A November 2011 Cochrane Review found that there was no "high quality evidence" that omega-3 fatty acids eased autistic symptoms.

The United States passed its Combating Autism Act in December 2006, providing US$1 billion for autism services and research in that country, over five years.

=== Public awareness and cultural representation ===
The rainbow jigsaw ribbon symbol was first used to represent autism in 1999, it being developed by the Autism Society of America.

The term allistic was coined by British autistic software engineer Andrew Main in January 2003. It means "not autistic".

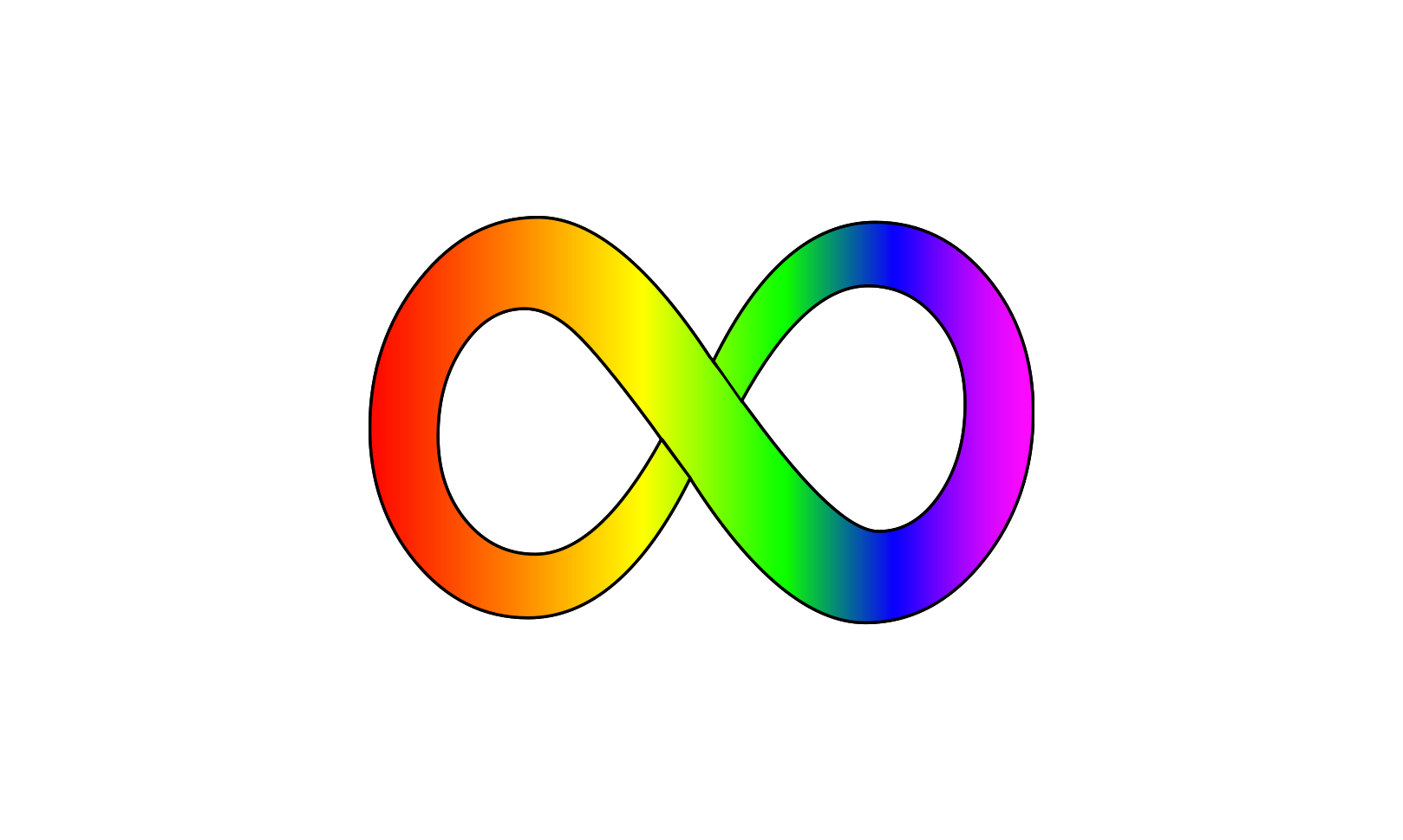
The rainbow infinity symbol was first used to represent autism in 2005.

Spoon theory was first published about by American lupus advocate Christine Miserandino in 2003.

Aspies for Freedom celebrated the first Autistic Pride Day on 18 June 2005. This event was also the first use of a rainbow infinity symbol to represent autism.

China's Eleventh Five Year Development Programme for the Disabled (中国残疾人事业"十一五"发展纲要) was released in 2006. It officially recognised autism as a neurological disability.

In 2009, Autism Speaks released the video "I am Autism", which portrayed the condition very negatively. People with a neutral or positive perception of their own autism complained, and the video was soon taken out of circulation. Autism Speaks has since strongly refuted the sentiments in the video.

On 30 March 2012, ASAN and Not Dead Yet organised the first nationwide Disability Day of Mourning, with vigils commemorating disabled people killed by family members or caregivers.

In April 2011, American indexer Paula C. Durbin-Westby established Autism Acceptance Day (later Autism Acceptance Month), intending to displace the Autism Awareness Month held in that country at that time.

Each year, the French government assigns a "Great National Cause" for the country to focus on. This includes much free publicity on state television and radio. Autism was the cause for 2012.

The SFARI website launched a "News & Opinion" section in 2008. This grew, and was given its own identity as Spectrum in 2015.

=== Pathological demand avoidance ===
British child psychologist Elizabeth Newson first saw the pattern of pathological demand avoidance (PDA) in children in 1980. She published a number of papers about it in the 1990s.

In 1997, the PDA Contact Group was established in the UK by parents of children with PDA. This later became the PDA Society.

In July 2003, Newson published an article arguing that PDA be recognised as a unique profile within the autism spectrum. She believed that autistic people with pronounced PDA symptoms tend to behave quite differently to those that do not, and that people with PDA symptoms often do not have common autistic symptoms.

=== New diagnostic tools ===
The "Reading the Mind in the Eyes Test" was first published in 1997 by Simon Baron-Cohen and others. A very well-cited revised version was released in February 2001, which also involved British experimental psychologist Sally Wheelwright.

The Modified Checklist for Autism in Toddlers (M-CHAT) was developed in 1999 by American psychologists Diana Robins, Deborah Fein and Marianne Barton. Revised versions, the M-CHAT-R (2009) and M-CHAT-R/F were later released.

In February 2001, the autism-spectrum quotient (AQ), a measure of autism within an individual, was released by a Simon Baron-Cohen-led team from the University of Cambridge.

The Gilliam Asperger's disorder scale was first published by American special education researcher James Gilliam in 2001.

The "Diagnostic Interview for Social and Communication Disorders" (DISCO) was released in March 2002 by Lorna Wing and others. It was a further development of the child-specific "Handicaps Behaviour and Skills" (HBS) schedule Wing had developed in the 1970s. As of 2023, it is still in use in the UK.

The Social Responsiveness Scale (SRS) was first published by American psychiatrist John Constantino in 2002. (The subsequent SRS-2 was released in 2011.)

The empathy quotient measure was released in April 2004 by Simon Baron-Cohen and Sally Wheelwright.

In February 2008, American psychiatrist Riva Ariella Ritvo and others released the Ritvo Autism and Asperger Diagnostic Scale (RAADS). A revised version, RAADS-R, was released in 2011.

Also in 2008, American psychologist Marilyn Monteiro released the "Monteiro Interview Guidelines for Diagnosing Asperger's Syndrome" (MIDGAS). Compared to other measures, it has a greater focus on sensory issues and on accounts from people who know the person being tested. The MIDGAS-2 (where "AS" stands for "the Autism Spectrum") was released in 2018, and was co-authored by fellow American psychologist Sheri Stegall.

The "Autism Spectrum Rating Scales" (ASRS) were first published by American psychologists Sam Goldstein and Jack Naglieri in 2009.

Replacing the earlier WHO/DAS, the refactored WHODAS 2.0 was released by WHO in 2010. Expanding greatly on the scope of its predecessor, it measures a person's disability from all causes, including autism. The development team was led by Turkish-Swiss psychiatrist Bedirhan Üstün.

=== Cognitive theories and concepts ===
The concept of hyperfocus was used in the mid-1990s, and began appearing in academic literature more commonly in the early 2000s.

Social dominance orientation was defined by the American psychologists Felicia Pratto, Jim Sidanius and Lisa M. Stallworth, and Austrian-American psychologist Bertram F. Malle, in October 1994. It was later suggested that autistic people may tend to differ from non-autistic people on this scale.

"Executive Functions and Developmental Psychopathology" is a well-cited paper published in January 1996. In it, the Americans Bruce F Pennington (psychiatrist) and Sally Ozonoff (psychologist) explored the effects of various conditions (including autism) on executive function.

American occupational therapist Winnie Dunn published a model of human sensory processing in April 1997. In it, she described how people having varying thresholds for sensing stimuli (high or low) and had varying behaviour responses to them (active or passive). Autistic people are more likely to be high on both these two factors than neurotypical people. When this is the case, they are categorised as being "sensory seeking". Autistic people can also be unusually "sensory avoidant" (and these are often the same people that are unusually "sensory seeking".) Autistic reaction to stimuli (and lack of stimuli) can lead to stimming.

The "process model" of emotion regulation was defined by American psychologist James Gross in September 1998.

The empathising–systemising theory of autism was released by Simon Baron-Cohen in June 2002.

The theory of monotropism was developed by three autistic activists, the British linguist and teacher Dinah Murray, British-Australian psychologist and social worker Wenn Lawson and British mathematician Mike Lesser. They started their formulation in the 1990s, and first published the theory in May 2005.

British psychiatrist Chris Frith and his wife Uta Frith published a well-cited short description of theory of mind in September 2005.

In January 2006, British neuroscientist Francesca Happé and Uta Frith published a well-cited paper furthering Frith's weak central coherence theory.

The concept of the double empathy problem was first described as such in October 2012 by British psychologist Damian Milton. The idea proposes that the interaction issues between autistic and non-autistic people are at least in part because these two types of people think differently from each other, understand other people in their own group, but have difficulty understanding people that think differently.

=== Clinical research ===
A paper published in April 1994 showed that early-pregnancy fetal thalidomide exposure could lead to autism. The lead author was the Swedish ophthalmologist Kerstin Strömland.

In February 1997, the Britons Patrick Bolton (psychiatrist) and Paul Griffiths (neuroradiologist) published about 18 patients with tuberous sclerosis, half of whom had some form of autism. They found a strong association between having tubers in the temporal lobes and autism.

The children's infection-caused condition PANDAS was first published about in August 1998 by American neuroscientist Susan Swedo and others. PANDAS (and other conditions in the group known as PANS), can cause autistic symptoms.

There are certain specialised parts of the brain that non-autistic people use to process face information. American psychologist Karen Pierce and others found that autistic people do not use these parts of the brain for this task. They also found that the fusiform face area in individuals with autism has a reduced volume. They published a paper on these and related findings in October 2001. (Pierce later found that autistic children did use the fusiform area when processing the faces of their parents and other children, but not strange adults).

"Model of autism: increased ratio of excitation/inhibition in key neural systems" by the Americans John Rubenstein (neurobiologist and psychiatrist) and Michael Merzenich (neuroscientist) was published in October 2003.

In October 2006, N. Carolyn Schanen (of the University of Delaware), found two chromosomes with a strong epigenetic association with autism.

"Strong Association of De Novo Copy Number Mutations with Autism" was published in April 2007 by 32 people including American geneticists Jonathan Sebat and Daniel Geschwind. It found that de novo germline mutation was a more significant causative factor for autism than was previously recognised.

The imprinted brain hypothesis of autism was first presented by Canadian biologist Bernard Crespi and British sociologist Christopher Badcock in June 2008.

"Psychiatric disorders in children with autism spectrum disorders: Prevalence, comorbidity, and associated factors in a population-derived sample" is a well-cited paper published in August 2008. Its six authors included the Britons Emily Simonoff (psychiatrist) and Andrew Pickles (biostatistician). It found that seventy percent of its autistic sample had at least one other recognised psychiatric condition, and that 41% had two or more. The most common comorbid diagnoses were social anxiety disorder (29%), ADHD (28%), and oppositional defiant disorder (28%).

The intense world theory of autism was first published about by husband-and-wife neuroscientists (and parents of an autistic child) Kamila Markram (German-Swiss) and Henry Markram (multinational) in December 2010.

In May 2011, American neuroscientist Jared Reser proposed that autistic traits, including increased abilities for spatial intelligence, concentration and memory, could have been naturally selected to enable self-sufficient foraging in a more (although not completely) solitary environment, referred to as the "Solitary Forager Hypothesis".

A study published in April 2012 estimated the global prevalence of autism and other PDDs. It found that 62 in every 10,000 people likely had ASD.

"Prenatal valproate exposure and risk of autism spectrum disorders and childhood autism" showed that taking the psychiatric drug valproate greatly increased the chance of a woman giving birth to a child with autism. Its lead author was Danish neurologist Jakob Christensen. The maternal effects of valproate were the subject of public debate in the UK in the 2010s and 2020s.

=== Emergence of neurodiversity ===
Neurodiversity refers to variation in how people think, learn, and experience the world. The neurodiversity perspective treats these differences as part of human variation.

The term was used in the late 1990s on the Independent Living mailing list. Early users in 1998 included Australian sociologist Judy Singer and American autistic self-advocate Jane Meyerding. The Institute for the Study of the Neurologically Typical (INST) also used the term. In September 1998, American journalist Harvey Blume used it in an article titled "Neurodiversity" in The Atlantic.

In 2000, autistic American activist Kassiane Asasumasu coined the term neurodivergent. She intended the term to include people with a wide range of neurological differences.

=== Publications and media ===
==== Books ====
Memoir Nobody Nowhere: The Extraordinary Autobiography of an Autistic Girl by Australian Donna Williams was published in 1992.

American teacher Brenda Smith Myles at the University of Kansas began writing books to help people with Asperger syndrome in the late 1990s. These books were also a substantial influence on Ontario autism support workers in 2011.

Asperger's Syndrome: A Guide for Parents and Professionals was published by British-Australian psychologist Tony Attwood in 1998. Attwood went on to publish widely on autistic topics. A survey of Ontario autism support workers in 2011 found that 52% had support programs influenced by him.

The 1998 book Teaching Language to Children with Autism or Other Developmental Disabilities established the practice of Verbal Behaviour Intervention (VBI). This applies the linguistic thinking of B. F. Skinner's 1957 book Verbal Behavior to teaching language to children. The book was written by American psychologists James W. Partington and Mark L. Sundberg. These authors and American speech pathologist Barbara Esch would go on to create the VB-MAPP instrument.

Pretending to Be Normal: Living with Asperger's Syndrome was an autobiography published by American researcher Liane Holliday Willey in 1999. She also coined the term aspie.

Educating Children with Autism was published in 2001 by the US National Research Council.

Social Skills Training was published by American psychologist Jed Baker in August 2003 (another edition was published in 2023). He followed this with the similarly notable No More Meltdowns in April 2008. These and his other works were substantially influential on Ontario autism support workers in 2011.

Autism CRC was established in March 2013 under the Australian Government's Cooperative Research Centres Program to support collaborative research on autism across the lifespan.

==== Scientific journals ====
The journal Autism Research was founded in February 2008 as the US-based journal of the International Society of Autism Research (INSAR), partnering with publishers Wiley-Blackwell.

The open access scientific journal Molecular Autism was first published in the UK by BioMed Central in December 2010.

==== Magazines and news publications ====
Autism Spectrum News began as a quarterly print publication in the United States in September 2008. It was founded by father-and-son Americans Ira Minot (social worker) and David Minot (musician). It became online-only in 2021.

Autism Eye magazine for parents and professional helpers of autistic children began publishing in 2011, by British married magazine editors (and parents of an autistic child) Gillian Loughran and Mark Hayes.

Autism Parenting Magazine was founded by British database administrator Mark Blakey in 2012.

==== Television ====
The character Sheldon Cooper first appeared on American television in The Big Bang Theory in September 2007. Aaccording to the actor who plays him as an adult, while not explicitly autistic, the character "could not display more traits" of Asperger's syndrome.

=== Organizations ===
==== Advocacy, self-advocacy, and online communities ====
The nationwide Confederación Autismo España (Autism Spain) was established in Spain in January 1994 by the coming together of autonomous community based organisations.

Yayasan Autisme Indonesia (Indonesian Autism Foundation) was founded by five doctors and eight parents of autistic people in 1997.

On November 21, 1998, the World Autism Organisation (WAO) began. It was set up by Autism-Europe to prompt the UN to do more about autism, and to increase autism support in countries with few services of that kind.

US group Talk About Curing Autism (TACA) was founded in 2000 by parents of autistic children. (In 2019, it was renamed "The Autism Community in Action").

The National Autism Association was founded in the United States in 2003 for parents of autistic people.

Aspies For Freedom (AFF) was established in 2004 as a global online organisation by Welsh husband-and-wife Gareth Nelson and Amy Nelson.

The autism community website Wrong Planet was started in 2004 by American high school students Dan Grover and Alex Plank.

American advocacy organisation Autism Speaks was founded in 2005 by businessman Bob Wright and his wife Suzanne Wright, grandparents of a child with autism.

The Autistic Self Advocacy Network (ASAN) was co-founded in November 2006 by Americans Ari Ne'eman and Scott Michael Robertson. Affiliated bodies were later formed in Australia/New Zealand, Canada and Portugal.

The ASEAN Autism Network was created in January 2010, linking together autism organisations in South East Asia.

==== Research and research funding ====
The US National Alliance for Autism Research was founded in 1994 by Americans Karen London and her psychiatrist husband Eric London. It merged with Autism Speaks in early 2006.

The International Society for Autism Research (INSAR) was formed in 2001 in the United States.

The British autism research charity Autistica was founded in 2004 by German-British software entrepreneur Dame Stephanie Shirley.

The Simons Foundation established the Simons Foundation Autism Research Initiative (SFARI) in 2006.

The Academic Autistic Spectrum Partnership In Research and Education (AASPIRE) was also founded in the United States in 2006. It focuses on improving the lives of autistic adults.

The Scientific Society Autism Spectrum (WGAS) was founded in Germany in 2008 by German psychologists Isabel Dziobek and Sven Bölte. It is active in all German-speaking countries.

The Autism Science Foundation was founded in the United States in April 2009, by Americans (and mothers of autistic children) Alison Singer (businessperson) and Karen London.

==== Education, employment, and family support ====
Ambitious About Autism is a UK group founded in 1997 to provide education to autistic children. It has since established five schools, and provides other services.

The Autism Resource Centre (Singapore) was established in 2000.

In 2001, Israeli Major General Gabi Ophir and others established Special in Uniform, an organisation that supports a squad of teens with disabilities or autism in the Israel Defense Forces.

Autistic-specialist employment services company Specialisterne was founded by Danish IT worker Thorkil Sonne in 2003.

The Raising Children Network launched raisingchildren.net.au in May 2006, with the endorsement and financial support of the Australian government.

The UK's Autism Education Trust was established by the National Autistic Society and the UK's Department for Children, Schools and Families in 2007.

The Autism Directory was launched in November 2010 by Welsh business manager (and mother of an autistic child) Nadine Honeybone.

==== Professional bodies and government coordination ====
The Korean Autism Society (한국자폐학회) Korean Autism Society was founded in South Korea in 1994. It has focused on professionals who treat those with the condition.

The Behavior Analyst Certification Board was founded in the United States in May 1998 to certify practitioners of applied behaviour analysis (ABA). It held its first certification exams in May 2000.

The United States' Interagency Autism Coordinating Committee was set up in 2000. It coordinates US government autism actions.

The International Board of Credentialing and Continuing Education Standards was founded in the United States in 2001. It provides training and certification to organisations that engage with autistic people.

The Association of Professional Behavior Analysts was founded in the United States in 2007.

In 2009, the Council on Autism Services was formed by 10 American autism service providers. The organisation was reformed as the "Council of Autism Service Providers" in 2015.

==== Other autism organizations ====
Autism Korea (한국자폐인사랑협회는) was founded in South Korea in January 2006.

== Neurodiversity and autism as a spectrum (since 2013) ==
=== Diagnostic classification ===
==== DSM-5 ====
In May 2013, the DSM-5 was released. It combined "autistic disorder", "Asperger's disorder", "CDD" and "PDD-NOS" into the broader concept of "autism spectrum disorder" (ASD), and discontinued the four earlier conditions. It also grouped the symptoms of ASD into two groups - impaired social communication and/or interaction, and restricted and/or repetitive behaviors. The new definition was narrower than the collective definitions of its DSM-IV predecessors had been, reducing the number of neurodivergent people covered by it. One study found 10-40% of people covered by the immediately previous definitions were not covered by that in the DSM-5.

The DSM-5 assigned three "severity levels" for ASD, with people in level 1 "requiring support", level 2 "requiring substantial support" and level 3 "requiring very substantial support". Some autism activists believe the autistic spectrum should not be measured in this way, as it does not take into account the greatly varying attributes the people in the different DSM severity levels have, or that support needs can be context-dependent.

DSM publishers, the American Psychiatric Association, said that "The revised diagnosis represents a new, more accurate, and medically and scientifically useful way of diagnosing individuals with autism-related disorders." It also noted that the conditions that the new ASD condition replaced "were not consistently applied across different clinics and treatment centers".

Another new condition was avoidant/restrictive food intake disorder (ARFID). A 2023 study found that 21% of autistic people had ARFID features.

Another major change in this edition of the DSM was allowing individuals to be diagnosed with both ASD and ADHD. Previously, under the DSM's rules people could only be diagnosed as having one of their antecedent conditions. There is evidence to suggest that a majority of people with ASD also have ADHD.

The group defining the autism definition was chaired by American neuroscientist (and PANDAS conceptualiser) Susan Swedo. ADOS developer Catherine Lord was an influential member of the group.

==== ICD-11 ====
January 2022 saw the first official use of the ICD-11 (it having been released in 2019). This version of the ICD combined all PDD conditions as "autistic spectrum disorder" (following the DSM's practice). However, unlike the DSM-5, the ICD-11 included a number of ASD subdivisions.

=== Cognitive theories and concepts ===
Though it had been conceptualised and had become popular with Autistic people much earlier, the concept of Autistic masking (Autistic people hiding their Autistic traits through suppressing or replacing behaviours) became a focus of academic research in the 2010s. Such masking often requires an exceptional mental effort, leading to cognitive overload. This is a main cause of burnout in Autistic people. It is also linked with other adverse mental health outcomes.

The concept of Severely Deficient Autobiographical Memory (SDAM) was first posited in a June 2015 paper by Canadian psychologist Daniela Palombo and others. People with autism often have poor autobiographical memory.

The term aphantasia (an inability to picture something in one's mind), was first published by British neurologist Adam Zeman, British neuropsychologist Michaela Dewar, and Italian-British neuroscientist Sergio Della Sala in December 2015. (The phenomenon was first described by British polymath Francis Galton in 1880.) A 2021 study led by British psychologist Carla Dance found that people with aphantasia had higher levels of autistic behavoirs than controls. A later Australasian study did not find such a correlation, and noted that many autistic people are visual thinkers.

An October 2016 paper by three researchers from the University of York examined Asperger syndrome as "an alternative prosocial adaptive strategy" which may have developed as a result of the emergence of "collaborative morality" in the context of small-scale hunter-gathering, i.e. where "a positive social reputation for making a contribution to group wellbeing and survival" becomes more important than complex social understanding.

The term "restraint collapse" was first published by Canadian counselling psychotherapist and teacher Andrea Loewen Nair in April 2017. It describes the collapse of behavioural restraint that can occur when people move from spending time in a rigid social environment (like a school) to a more casual one (like a home). This can manifest as a meltdown. Autistic people who make great efforts to conform to a social situation often experience restraint collapse when leaving that situation.

The concept of autistic burnout became much more common on Twitter in 2017–18, and subsequently attracted more academic research. The establishing paper on the subject was published by American systems scientist Dora Raymaker et al. in June 2020.

An August 2025 study led by Spanish psychologist Laura Lacomba-Trejo found that autistic people have higher rates of insecure attachment than the general population. Helping autistic people develop a secure attachment style can benefit them.

The concept of visibility logic was first publicly posited in April 2026, by Norwegian teacher Marte Oline Vågnes Dalmo.

=== Clinical research ===
A December 2013 published study found that the brains of children with Asperger syndrome produced (on average) 42% more information when at rest, compared to non-ASD children. It was conducted by Spanish-Canadian biochemist and biophysicist Jose Luis Perez-Velazquez, and Spanish-American neuroscientist Roberto Fernández Galán.

Autism Speaks, The Hospital for Sick Children and Google Genomics began the AUT10K project in 2014. It created one of the world's largest collections of autism related genetic material, and had open access to researchers, called AGRE. The project later evolved into the similar MSSNG project. MSSNG aims to "provide the best resources to enable the identification of many subtypes of autism." The MSSNG project was quickly met with criticism from autistic self-advocates.

"Synaptic, transcriptional and chromatin genes disrupted in autism" was a well-cited paper published in October 2014.

The as-yet untested hypothesis of "RCCX Theory" was first self-published in February 2016 by American psychiatrist and internal medicine physician Sharon Meglathery. It posits that genetic variations in the RCCX cluster lead to a cluster of comorbid autism, Ehlers–Danlos syndrome, postural orthostatic tachycardia syndrome (POTS) and other conditions. Others have also considered parts of this cluster. The theory gained greater prominence in September 2024.

French neuroscientist Mohamed Jaber found that the brain's motor fronto-striatal and cerebellar systems were major sites of autistic brain difference, and published about it in an April 2017 paper.

"Prevalence of Autism Spectrum Disorder Among Children Aged 8 Years — Autism and Developmental Disabilities Monitoring Network, 11 Sites, United States, 2014" was released in April 2018 by 26 US-based authors led by epidemiologist Jon Baio.

A January 2022 published study by Catherine Lord and others introduced the concept of profound autism. It refers to autistic people that have no or minimal verbal language, and/or an IQ less than 50. The "profound" refers to the perpetual access to a carer that adults with the condition require, noting that "profound autism is thus defined not by autistic features but by intellectual or language disability." A 2023 CDC study found that 27% of American 8 year olds with autism had this condition.

An August 2024 published study found that male mouse foetuses with low aromatase activity were more likely to develop autism symptoms post-birth, and this likelihood could be increased by maternal BPA exposure. It also found a connection between maternal BPA exposure and male child autism in humans. The study was led by Singaporean-Australian biochemist Wah Chin Boon and Australian epidemiologist Anne-Louise Ponsonby.

In July 2025, a team led by Russian-American computer scientist Olga Troyanskaya published that they had found four biologically distinct autism subtypes with differing comorbidities and symptoms.

The four subtypes were:

- Moderate challenges (low impact of the seven autism symptom factors measured)
- Broadly affected (high impact of all factors, frequent co-occurring conditions (particularly OCD, seizures/epilepsy and tics), very high rate of intellectual disability)
- Social and/or behavioural (low impact of developmental delay, and frequent co-occurring OCD, tics, ADHD, anxiety, seizures/epilepsy and major depression, high rate of intellectual disability)
- Mixed ASD with developmental delay (low impact of mood symptoms and disruptive behaviour, frequent co-occurring seizures/epilepsy, very high rate of intellectual disability)

In October 2025, a team led by the psychiatry researchers Xinhe Zhang (Chinese-British) and Varun Warrier (Indian-British) published that they had found two biologically distinct autism subtypes. One is a typically early-diagnosed condition that includes significant childhood communication difficulties. The other is typically later-diagnosed, involving significant adolescent social difficulties, and has significant overlap with ADHD, depression, and PTSD.

A May 2026 published study found two biologically defined subtypes of autism, one that was hypoconnectivity-dominant and the other that was hyperconnectivity-dominant. They also found that 59% of the autistic people studied did not fit either subtype. The lead author was Italian neuroimager Alessandro Gozzi.

=== New diagnostic tools ===
A diagnostic test called the "Aspie Quiz" was released by Swedish researcher Leif Ekblad in July 2013.

A National Guideline for the Assessment and Diagnosis of Autism Spectrum Disorders in Australia was released by Autism CRC in August 2018.

The Camouflaging Autistic Traits Questionnaire (CAT-Q) was released by British psychologist Laura Hull, Simon Baron-Cohen and others in March 2019.

The Autistic Burnout construct screening test for burnout in autistic people was released in May 2023. It was developed by American psychologist Jared Richards and twelve others.

=== Treatment approaches and social policy ===
The medication guanfacine was found to be an effective treatment for hyperactivity, impulsiveness, and distractibility in autistic children, in an August 2015 paper. The lead author was American epidemiologist Laurence Scahill.

Another March 2019 published study found that microbiota transfer therapy was an effective treatment for autistic symptoms. The lead author was Korean-American environmental engineer Dae-Wook Kang.

"Identification, Evaluation, and Management of Children With Autism Spectrum Disorder" was published in January 2020. It was a wholistic primer on child autism for doctors. The lead author was American paediatrician Susan L. Hyman.

The report Interventions for children on the autism spectrum: A synthesis of research evidence was released by the Autism CRC in November 2020.

Autism CRC released the National Framework for assessing children's functional strengths and support needs in Australia in December 2024.

Simultaneously, it was announced that leucovorin was to be begin the US government approval process for treating cerebral folate deficiency, which was said to be a cause of autistic symptoms in some people.

A study by American psychologist Henny Kupferstein published in January 2018 found that Autistic people who had been given ABA therapy were 86% more likely to have PTSD than those who had not.

An ABA tool, the graduated electric decelarator, became the third device ever banned by the United States' Food and Drug Administration (FDA) in March 2020. Its main user, the Judge Rotenberg Center, filed a lawsuit against the FDA, and in July 2021, the DC Circuit Court overturned the ban, meaning that the centre can still use the device.

The "Occupational performance skills observed during the ongoing stream of a social exchange" were first published by the American occupational therapists Barbara Boyt Schell and Glen Gillen in 2014. They were later adapted and adopted by the American Occupational Therapy Association as the Occupational Therapy Practice Framework Social Interaction Skills.

The "Autism Navigator" website for parents and clinicians of children that have or are suspected of having autism, was launched in April 2015 by Florida State University. It is highly regarded by the American Academy of Pediatrics.

The first Social Communication Intervention Programme (SCIP) manual was published in 2015 by British speech and language therapist Catherine Adams. SCIP was based on research she and others had conducted since 2005. The program teaches social communication skills to children. It involves social understanding and social interpretation, pragmatics and language processing.

The Hidden Disabilities Sunflower program was established in 2016 by London's Gatwick Airport, in consultation with two autism support groups and other disability advocates. It soon spread across the UK, and later to other developed countries.

The first Loop noise-reducing earplugs were released in 2018, by Belgians Dimitri O (mechanical engineer) and Maarten Bodewes (businessperson). These allow users to hear the world at a reduced volume.

The ABA Coding Coalition greatly changed US prescription practice to fund more ABA treatment of Autistic people on 1 January 2019. It did this by convincing the American Medical Association to class ABA as a proven effective treatment in the government mandated Current Procedural Terminology coding system, while previously it was classed as only having some evidence of efficacy. This meant that US health insurance companies now had to fund prescribed ABA for their clients, when previously they could contest it. (The Coalition was made up of the Association of Professional Behavior Analysts, Autism Speaks, and the Behavior Analyst Certification Board).

The Blue Envelope Program helps US police understand how Autistic people behave, and vice versa. It began operating in January 2020.

The world's first national standard for autistic-friendly architecture was released by the British Standards Institute in October 2022.

The National Guideline for Supporting the Learning, Participation, and Wellbeing of Autistic Children and Their Families in Australia was released by Autism CRC in February 2023.

=== Public awareness and cultural representation ===
In April 2021, America's Autism Awareness Month became Autism Acceptance Month.

In September 2025, US President Donald Trump, the US Department of Health and Human Services and the US Food and Drug Administration announced that paracetamol (acetaminophen) use should be avoided by pregnant mothers due to it being a cause of autism, and that it is also better for an unborn baby than their mother running a high fever. Many other health authorities believed the autism-inducing effects to be less than warned.

The first Autistic Barbie doll was released in January 2026. It was developed with the assistance of ASAN.

=== Co-occurring conditions ===
The term AuDHD, describing people with both autism and ADHD, began to be used in scientific papers from around 2018.

=== Organizations ===
KultureCity was established in 2013 to help people with sensory processing difficulties, by American husband-and-wife doctors Julian Maha and Michelle Kong.

The Iran Autism Association was founded in 2013 by treatment professionals along with Autistic people and their families.

Brazilian researcher Alysson Muotri and others founded the company Tismoo in 2015, which aims to develop genetic treatments for autism and other conditions.

In October 2015, representative body Autism Canada was created through the merger of Autism Society Canada and Autism Canada Foundation.

2016 saw Australia's main state-based and other autism representative organisations group together as the Australian Autism Alliance.

Neurodiversity employment services organisation Untapped Group was co-founded by Australian accountant Andrew Eddy in 2017. It operates in the United States and Australia, and notably organises the prominent Autism at Work conferences.

In March 2017, the Russian peak parents-of-autistic-children representative body Autism Regions (Аутизм Регионы) was founded.

Also in the United States in January 2019, the National Council on Severe Autism was founded. It is concerned with Autistic people who have an IQ of 85 or less.

Global online support organisation the "Stimpunks Foundation" was established in the United States in December 2021, by IT workers Ryan Boren and Inna Boren.

=== Publications and media ===
==== Histories and reference works ====
In January 2009, French psychoanalyst and psychiatrist Jacques Hochmann published Histoire de l'autisme : de l'enfant sauvage aux troubles envahissants du développement.

A History of Autism: Conversations with the Pioneers appeared in October 2010. Its author, Adam Feinstein, is a British autism researcher.

Understanding Autism: Parents, Doctors, and the History of a Disorder appeared in November 2011. Its author, Chloe Silverman, is an American historian of science.

In 2013, Dutch autism researcher Mitzi Waltz published Autism: A Social and Medical History.

The first edition of the Encyclopedia of Autism Spectrum Disorders appeared in 2013. American psychiatrist Fred Volkmar was its chief editor. A second edition appeared in 2021.

American journalists John Donvan and Caren Zucker published In a Different Key: The Story of Autism in January 2016. The book was a finalist for a Pulitzer Prize in 2017. A documentary based on the book appeared in 2021.

In 2017, Bonnie Evans published The Metamorphosis of Autism: A History of Child Development in Britain. Evans is a British historian of health.

Asperger's Children: The Origins of Autism in Nazi Vienna by American historian Edith Sheffer appeared in May 2018.

==== Scientific journals ====
In 2014, Springer published the first issue of the Review Journal of Autism and Developmental Disorders. The following year, Emerald Publishing published the first issue of Advances in Autism. In 2016, Sage Publishing began publishing Autism & Developmental Language Impairments, an open access journal.

In 2022, the Journal of Autism and Developmental Disorders announced Lynn Kern Koegel as its new co-editor.

==== Personal accounts of autism ====
In 2018, Jennifer Cook O'Toole published Autism in Heels: The Untold Story of a Female Life on the Spectrum, a memoir about her life as an autistic woman.

Our Autistic Lives collects personal accounts from autistic adults aged 20 to over 70. British autism writer Alex Ratcliffe compiled the collection. It appeared in January 2020.

In 2022, Annie Kotowicz published What I Mean When I Say I'm Autistic: Unpuzzling a Life on the Autism Spectrum. She combines stories from her own life with reporting on autism.

In 2023, Scottish comedian Fern Brady published Strong Female Character, a memoir about her life and her autism diagnosis. Her touring stand-up show Autistic Bikini Queen became a Netflix special in 2024.

==== Books on autism and neurodiversity ====
In 2015, speech-language pathologist Barry M. Prizant and writer Tom Fields-Meyer published Uniquely Human: A Different Way of Seeing Autism. The book encourages readers to consider why an autistic person might behave in a particular way. An expanded edition appeared in 2022.

In 2020, journalist Jenara Nerenberg published Divergent Mind: Thriving in a World That Wasn't Designed for You. The book examines the experiences of neurodivergent women, including autistic women and women with attention deficit hyperactivity disorder (ADHD).

Also in 2020, Casey Vormer published Connecting with the Autism Spectrum, a guide to understanding and communicating with autistic adults.

In 2022, social psychologist Devon Price published Unmasking Autism: Discovering the New Faces of Neurodiversity. The book explores autistic masking, which can involve hiding or suppressing autistic traits to meet social expectations.

==== Guides to applied behaviour analysis ====
In 2017, behaviour analyst Makoto Shibutani published The ABA Visual Language: Applied Behavior Analysis. The book uses illustrations and examples to explain terms used in applied behaviour analysis (ABA).

In 2018, behaviour analyst Victoria Boone published Positive Parenting for Autism: Powerful Strategies to Help Your Child Overcome Challenges and Thrive, a guide to ABA strategies for parents.

In 2021, registered nurse and behaviour analyst Mary Lynch Barbera published Turn Autism Around: An Action Guide for Parents of Young Children with Early Signs of Autism. The guide presents ABA strategies for parents of young children.

==== Children's fiction ====
In 2019, Scholastic published Libby Scott and Rebecca Westcott's novel Can You See Me? in the United Kingdom. The novel follows an autistic girl as she starts secondary school. Scott drew on her own experiences to write the character's diary entries.

==== Educational software ====
Compedia and university researchers developed EmotiPlay, a digital game designed to help autistic children recognize emotions. In 2017, researchers published the results of a study that evaluated the game with children in Israel, Sweden and the United Kingdom.

== Human rights issues ==
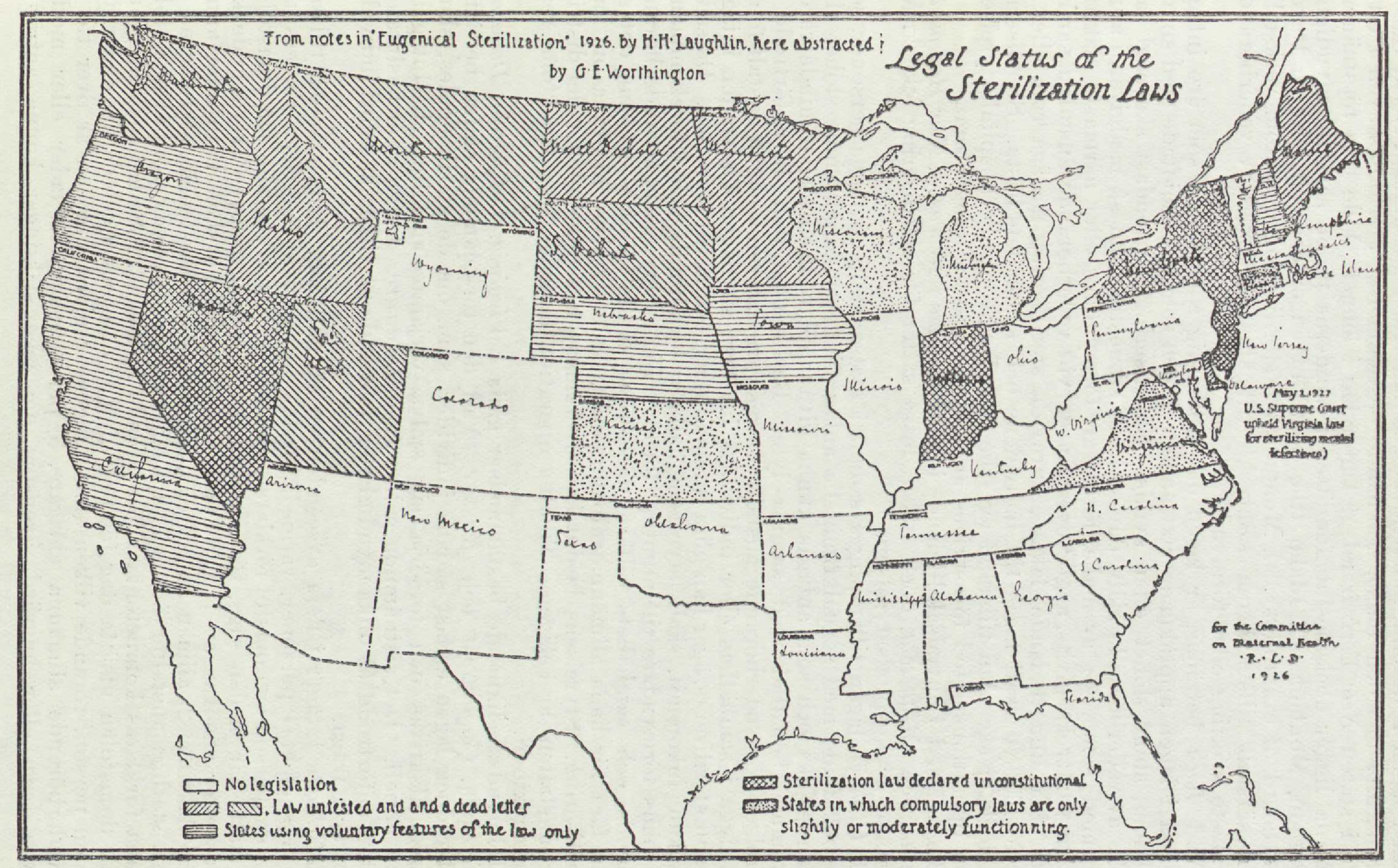
A map from a 1929 Swedish royal commission report displays the US states that had implemented sterilization legislation by then.

=== Institutional care and forced sterilization ===
Indiana became the first US state to enact sterilization legislation in 1907.

In 1913, the Mental Deficiency Act was passed in England and Wales, ensuring institutional care for all children identified as "mental defectives".

Forced sterilization rates of disabled people across the United States were relatively low, with the exception of California, until the 1927 US Supreme Court decision in Buck v. Bell. It upheld the forced sterilization of patients at a Virginia home for intellectually disabled people under the US Constitution.

=== Aktion T4 ===
In July 1933, the Nazi government passed the Law for the Prevention of Hereditarily Diseased Offspring. It prescribed compulsory sterilization for people with disabling conditions thought to be hereditary. The law was administered by the Interior Ministry under German Interior Minister Wilhelm Frick through special Hereditary Health Courts. These examined people in asylums, special schools and other facilities to select those to be sterilized. An estimated 360,000 people were sterilized under the law between 1933 and 1939.

In August 1939, German nurses were asked to identify young children with intellectual disabilities. From September, these children began to be secretly sentenced to death. This sentencing was soon extended to older children, adults and people with other disabilities. This death policy was later known as Aktion T4.

In August 1941, German public outcry against these semi-secret killings led to the official end of the program. However, its aims continued to be quietly pursued until the end of the Third Reich in 1945. Between 275,000 and 300,000 people were killed in psychiatric hospitals in the German Reich from 1939 to 1945.

=== Protection against discrimination and exclusion ===
In 1970, US schools educated only one in five children with disabilities. Many states had laws excluding emotionally disturbed and intellectually disabled children from public education.

The Education for All Handicapped Children Act was passed in November 1975. It guaranteed each disabled child a free and appropriate public education. The act became the Individuals with Disabilities Education Act in 1990.

China's Compulsory Education Law was enacted in 1986. Like the American act, it required public schools to accept students with disabilities.

In December 2012, Brazil passed the Berenice Piana Law, which created the National Policy for the Protection of the Rights of Persons with Autism Spectrum Disorder. This officially classified autism as a disability under Brazilian law.

=== Child protection and family separation ===
In 2013, a French mother known publicly as Rachel had her three children taken from her by the government. Authorities claimed that the children were mistreated, as evidenced by their unusual behavior. Rachel claimed that their behavior was due to autism and other conditions, but government health authorities disagreed. It was subsequently determined that two of the children had autism and the other had attention deficit hyperactivity disorder, or ADHD, and that Rachel herself had Asperger's syndrome. The matter gained great publicity in France as the Affaire Rachel.

== See also ==
- History of Asperger syndrome
- Autism in China
- Autism in Brazil
- Autism in France
