= Marilyn J. Monteiro =

American psychologist

- Education: Grinnell College (BA); Drake University (MA); Western Michigan University (PhD)
- Occupation: Psychologist

Marilyn J. Monteiro is an American psychologist who specializes in evaluating and diagnosing children on the spectrum of autism disorders.

== Education and training ==
Monteiro graduated from Grinnell College with a BA in Psychology and Education. She has an M.A. in psychology (Experimental Analysis of Behavior) from Drake University and a Ph.D. in psychology (Applied Behavior Analysis) from Western Michigan University. She has also completed post-graduate training in family systems therapy at Southwest Family Institute in Dallas, Texas.

== Career ==
She is a licensed psychologist specializing in diagnosing autism disorders whose clinical work focuses on training other professionals to use her methods to diagnose and work with children on the autism spectrum and their families.

== Publications and research ==
Monteiro is the author of the book, Autism Conversations: Evaluating Children on the Autism Spectrum through Authentic Conversations, published by Western Psychological Services. Autism Conversations teaches practitioners how to use conversational techniques to connect with children, build trust with the child's parents, and plan for successful interventions.

She has also created a testing method called the "Monteiro Interview Guidelines for Diagnosing Asperger's Syndrome: A Team-Based Approach" (MIGDAS). MIGDAS is a qualitative interview protocol for clinicians who evaluate verbal children and adolescents with suspected high-functioning forms of autism, including Asperger syndrome.

Additionally, Monteiro has also published an article entitled Autism Conversations: The Sensory Entry Point for S.I. Focus, The International Magazine Dedicated to Improving Sensory Integration.
