= Relationship Development Intervention =

Proprietary treatment program for autism spectrum disorders

Relationship Development Intervention (RDI) is a trademarked proprietary treatment program for autism spectrum disorders (ASD), based on the belief that the development of dynamic intelligence is the key to improving the quality of life for autistic people. The program's core philosophy is that autistic people can participate in authentic emotional relationships if they are exposed to them in a gradual, systematic way. The goal of treatment is to systematically build up the motivation and tools for successfully interacting in social relationships, to correct deficits in this area that are thought to be common to all autistic people.

RDI focuses on cultivating the building blocks of social connection—such as referencing, emotion sharing, coregulation, and experience sharing—that normally develop in infancy and early childhood. RDI is a family-based program, where trained consultants support families to alter their interaction and communication styles. There is a period of parent education, followed by an assessment of both the child and the child-parent relationship. After that consultants support the family through a set of specific objectives to build a "guided participation" relationship between parents and child that will allow the child to once again become a "cognitive apprentice" to the parents. Once the cognitive apprenticeship is in place, the family can move on to specific cognitive remediation objectives for the child. These are developmentally staged objectives designed to restore optimal neural connectivity through a series of "discoveries" and "elaborations".

After four years, the RDI Program has evolved into RDIconnect, a company with a series of programs not only for autistics, but for other populations as well. Along with a Consultant Training program, RDIConnect now offers the Family Guided Participation Program, Dynamic Education Program and the RDI Program for ASD, each accompanied by tools that help organize, expedite and create a continuous dialogue between professional and parent. RDIConnect now applies the quality assurance, level of treatment and training that has been central to their internationally known program and to a new audience.

== History ==
The RDI program was developed by the psychologist Steven Gutstein in the 1990s. Gutstein studied the means by which typical children become competent in the world of emotional relationships. He looked at the research in developmental psychology and found that early parent-infant interaction predicted later abilities in language, thinking and social development. Two books of RDI-based activities as well as a book explaining the background ideas were published in 2002, but RDI has changed significantly since then and is now only available through the RDI_LS, or learning system, accessed by trained consultants.

There are now trained consultants in the US, UK, Australia, Canada, China, Japan, Singapore, India, Israel, Italy, Malaysia, Mexico, New Zealand, and Switzerland.

Latest publications by Dr. Steven Gutstein are: My Baby Can Dance - Stories of Autism, Asperger's and Success through the Relationship Development Intervention (RDI) Program (2005), The Relationship Development Intervention (RDI) Program and Education (2007), and The RDI Book - Forging New Pathways for Autism, Asperger's and PDD with the Relationship Development Intervention Program (2009).

== Major ideas ==
RDI is based on the idea that "dynamic intelligence" must be enhanced for autistic children to develop typical behaviors. Dynamic Intelligence means being able to think flexibly, take different perspectives, cope with change, and process information simultaneously (e.g. listen and look at the same time). These abilities are essential in the real world.

Neural underconnectivity in autistic people leads to a rigid and static view of the world. Because of this dislike of change and inability to cope with new information, autistic people do not develop dynamic intelligence which is essential for relationships, independence and quality of life.

Typical children develop dynamic intelligence through guided participation, that is being guided and given challenges by their caregivers. Due to their social difficulties, this relationship breaks down in autistic children and so families must be supported to re-build it, in a slow and more deliberate manner. Children need to learn to reference their parents, share emotions and use experience-sharing language to build a close and trusting relationship where they can learn and cope with the uncertainty of life.

The six objectives of RDI are to improve the following:

- Emotional referencing: learning from the subjective and emotional experiences of others
- Social coordination: controlling behavior and observing others to enable participation in social relationships
- Declarative language: using language and non-verbal communication to interact with others
- Flexible thinking: adapting and altering plans when circumstances change
- Relational information processing: placing things in context and solving problems lacking clear solutions
- Foresight and hindsight: anticipating future possibilities based on past experiences

== Effectiveness ==
While the Connections Center has conducted two studies into RDI, there have been as yet no independent studies, although there is currently one study being conducted at the University of Sydney, Australia.

In a 2007 study, children whose families had participated in RDI and who had relatively high IQ at start of treatment showed dramatic changes in diagnostic category on the Autism Diagnostic Observation Schedule (ADOS) and Autism Diagnostic Interview-Revised (ADI-R), though the study represented a non-experimental study without a control group and whose evaluators were not blinded to time in treatment.
