= Bruce F. Pennington =

American psychologist (born 1946)

- Born: Bruce Franklin Pennington; July 18, 1946 (age 79)
- Education: Harvard University; Duke University
- Known for: Attention-deficit hyperactivity disorder; Autism; Developmental dyslexia
- Scientific career
- Fields: Psychology
- Institutions: University of Denver
- Thesis: What Piaget's Conservation of Number Task Doesn't Tell Us About a Child's Understanding of Numerical Invariance and Arithmetic (1977)

Bruce Franklin Pennington (born July 18, 1946) is an American psychologist and Professor Emeritus in the Department of Psychology at the University of Denver. He is recognized for his research on developmental disorders such as autism, attention-deficit hyperactivity disorder, and developmental dyslexia.
