= Jonathan Green (psychiatrist) =

British psychiatrist

Jonathan Green is a British professor of child and adolescent psychiatry at the University of Manchester. He is a specialist in autism spectrum disorders. He co-led the first study in the United Kingdom into ICD Asperger syndrome and has written research studies about social and language development in Autism Spectrum Disorder, co-morbidity and treatment intervention.

In 2015, Green's research tracked 54 young children from infancy to understand how autism develops in the earliest childhood years including what happens during the months and years before a diagnosis of the disorder. In 2018 he was appointed Senior Investigator by the National Institute for Health and Care Research (NIHR).

Green was elected a Fellow of the Academy of Medical Sciences in 2022.

In 2023, Green proposed a model of autism as "emergent and transactional", incorporating neurodiversity perspectives in addition to clinical and research perspectives.
