= APA Award for Distinguished Professional Contributions to Applied Research =

The APA Award for Distinguished Professional Contributions to Applied Research (until 2003 known as the Award for Distinguished Professional Contributions to Knowledge) is a scientific award presented by the American Psychological Association "to a psychologist whose research has led to important discoveries or developments in the field of applied psychology."

The 1997 award to John E. Exner raised a controversy, as it was seen as granting a professional endorsement to the Rorschach test, seen by some as pseudoscience.

== List of recipients ==
Source: American Psychological Association

- 1979 Sol L. Garfield, Leopold Bellak, Harry Levinson
- 1980 Leonard D. Eron
- 1981 Carl Eisdorfer
- 1982 Roy Schafer
- 1983 Neal E. Miller
- 1984 Norman Frederiksen
- 1985 Albert Ellis
- 1986 Edward Zigler
- 1987 Mary D. S. Ainsworth, Hans H. Strupp
- 1988 Herman Feifel
- 1989 Allen E. Bergin
- 1990 Manfred J. Meier
- 1991 W. Grant Dahlstrom, Joseph Matarazzo
- 1992 Leopold Bellak, Harry Levinson
- 1993 Paul E. Meehl
- 1994 John L. Holland
- 1995 Kenneth I. Howard, Lester B. Luborsky
- 1996 Paul Satz
- 1997 John E. Exner, Samuel M. Turner
- 1998/1999 Peter E. Nathan
- 2000 Simon H. Budman
- 2001 Marvin R. Goldfried
- 2002 John D. Krumboltz
- 2003 Theodore Millon, Stanley Sue
- 2004 Robert J. Gatchel
- 2005 Gail S. Goodman
- 2006 Stephen M. Weiss
- 2007 Bruce E. Wampold
- 2008 Richard Rogers
- 2009 Luciano L'Abate
- 2010 Catherine E. Lord
- 2011 Ronald F. Levant
- 2012 Leslie S. Greenberg
- 2013 Richard M. Fox
- 2014 J. Thomas Grisso
- 2015 Leonard A. Jason
- 2016 Albert Rivera
- 2017 Cameron J. Camp
- 2018 Gary W. Harper
- 2019 David C. Schwebel
- 2020 Nancy E. Betz
- 2021 Joseph Patrick Gone
- 2022 Sandra Graham-Bermann
- 2023 Jennifer Wolff
- 2024 Pim Cuijpers
- 2025 Karen Chan Osilla

== See also ==
- List of psychology awards
