= Global perceptions of autism =

Global variation of autism diagnoses, treatments, and experiences

Diagnosis, treatment, and experiences of autism vary globally. Although the diagnoses of autism is rising in post-industrial nations, diagnosis rates are much lower in developing nations.

== Africa ==
=== Diagnosis ===
Autism research conducted in Africa has been infrequent and unrepresentative of all African countries, making the prevalence of autism in Africa difficult to estimate. Prevalence may be underestimated because reported cases are skewed toward more severe, and thus more recognizable, cases of autism. In Africa, an autism diagnosis often co-occurs with epilepsy or intellectual disability.

=== Treatment ===
Possible reasons for the fact that many reported cases of autism in Africa are nonverbal cases include difficulty finding services even when a diagnosis is given. Educational and behavioral interventions for children with autism are largely unavailable, mental health care facilities are few, and there are too few facilities and personnel trained to work with autistic children in reference to the estimated number of autism cases in Africa. Bakare and Munir found that health care workers had low to average knowledge and awareness of autism spectrum disorder. In particular, psychiatric health care workers recognized symptoms of ASD better than pediatric health care workers, which implies that early recognition and intervention for children with autism in Africa is infrequent. Supernatural explanations of autism can influence treatment seeking by encouraging people to first seek help from spiritualists and traditional healers.

=== Experience ===
Studies have not elucidated the clinical presentation of autism in African nations. Autism awareness is low, particularly in sub-Saharan Africa. Bakare and Munir suggest that education for the public and for health care workers is crucial for early diagnosis of ASD so that early intervention can be effective for African children.

== Asia ==
=== Diagnosis ===
Autism was not recognized until the 1980s in China. The estimated prevalence of autism is 11.8 per 10,000 people while the estimated prevalence of autism spectrum conditions is 26.6 per 10,000 people. In Japan, estimates of autism spectrum are as high as 13 per 10,000 people. This suggests that autism is more common in Asia than previously thought. The Childhood Autism Rating Scale (CARS), Clancy Autism Behavior Scale (CABS), Autism Behavior Checklist (ABC), and Checklist for Autism in Toddlers (CHAT) are frequently used as diagnostic instruments in China. (See Autism in China)

In India the Indian Scale for Assessment of Autism (ISAA) has been deployed since 2009; based on CARS, it is available in several regional languages.

=== Treatment ===
In 2013, eight South Asian countries adopted a charter at the South Asian Autism Network's first meeting. The nations plan on working with each other's ministries, and SAAN is advocating long-term health care as well as intervention programs for people with autism.

=== Experience ===
In certain areas, diagnosis and treatment of autism may be difficult because of the lack of facilities or physicians capable of autism recognition. Some families must travel for hours or days to reach an area in which diagnostic facilities are available. Stigma is also a salient issue. Families of children with autism in Hong Kong and China may experience stigmatization from others, which can lead to self-stigmatization in cultures where people focus on their social identity rather than their individual identity. This suggests that parents in China and Hong Kong may experience more stress from raising a child with autism than parents in other areas. Support from friends, families, and professionals is critical to enhance the psychological well-being of parents experiencing stigma. Autism may be of particular significance in India because of its characteristic abnormalities in social relationships, which may cause particular concern due to the value of social relatedness and conformity to social norms in India.

Questions about a potential cause of the Hikikomori phenomenon in Japan have been hypothesized. Because Hikikomori is similar to the social withdrawal exhibited by some people with autism spectrum disorders, some psychiatrists suggest that it may be related to autism spectrum disorders and other disorders that may affect social integration, but that their disorders are altered from their typical Western presentation because of Japanese sociocultural pressures.

== Developing countries ==
As recently as 1984, researchers questioned whether autism was a universal phenomenon. Some scientists believed that autism was a condition limited to Western and technologically developed nations; however, now there is evidence of increased prevalence of and knowledge about ASD cross-culturally and internationally. Although autism has a biological basis and there are clear criteria for an autism diagnosis, its symptoms may be viewed differently across cultures. These differences may extend to the perception of autism in different cultures and perceptions of the most effective treatment options.

== Western countries ==
=== Diagnosis ===
The median prevalence rate of autism spectrum disorders in Europe is 59 per 10,000 people, while the median prevalence estimated in North America is 86 per 10,000. In western nations, children who show developmental problems are referred for evaluation by a pediatrician. Preliminary screening instruments include the Modified Checklist for Autism in Toddlers (M-CHAT), Social Communication Questionnaire (SCQ), and Autism Spectrum Screening Questionnaire (ASSQ). Autism spectrum evaluations are typically conducted by professionals who specialize in developmental disorders, such as psychologists, psychiatrists, or neurologists. Diagnostic instruments that assessing clinicians may use include the Autism Diagnostic Interview-Revised, Autism Diagnostic Observation Schedule, and Childhood Autism Rating Scale, as well as clinical judgment using criteria from the Diagnostic and Statistical Manual.

=== Treatment ===
Behavioral intervention and medications are frequently used to manage the symptoms of autism. Early intervention programs can improve cognitive and language skills in children who have been diagnosed with autism spectrum disorder. Behavioral interventions include Applied Behavioral Analysis, Developmental, Individual Difference, Relationship-based (DIR)/Floortime Model, and Treatment and Education of Autistic and Related Communication Handicapped Children (TEACCH).

There are no medications that have been approved to treat autism spectrum disorder, but some medications may be prescribed off-label to treat symptoms of ASD. Antipsychotic medications may be used to reduce irritability and aggression in children with autism. Stimulant medications are used to treat symptoms of hyperactivity and inattentiveness. Antidepressant medications are occasionally prescribed to reduce the restricted and repetitive behaviors associated with autism. More research is needed to determine if the safety and effectiveness of medications.

=== Experience ===
The estimated lifetime cost of caring for an individual with autism as of 2013 is between $1.4 million and $2.4 million, using data from the United Kingdom and the United States. While some of these costs are incurred for diagnosis and treatment costs, the problem is exacerbated by reduced family earnings when a family member may forgo working in order to care for a family member with autism.

== Challenges ==
Researchers who aim to obtain reliable data about autism around the world are challenged by many factors. Awareness about autism differs from nation to nation. Services for people with autism and their families differs in availability. The behavior of people with autism may differ cross-culturally, and the capacity to do autism research can be impeded because of these differences. A further challenge is that caregivers and professionals must have knowledge that certain symptoms are associated with autism, and they must perceive these symptoms as problematic. In a certain culture, for example, if language delays are not seen as uncommon until a child is four or five, a professional may not see the delay as symptomatic of autism. In some nations, such as South Korea, the stigma surrounding autism is so high that families may avoid getting their child tested for autism even when the child has noticeable developmental delays.

Elsabbagh and colleagues (2012) cite multiple challenges for researchers, including lack of funding for research. The 10/90 gap means that only 10 percent of global spending on health goes toward funding for problems that affect the poorest 90 percent of the world. They also discuss the lack of accessibility or availability of autism services, the expensive cost of resources for epidemiological studies, and variation in diagnosis because clinical judgment is often used for diagnosis.

Autism research is further complicated by the fact that families often have different perceptions of autism's etiology. Beliefs include the child being a product of witchcraft or parental misdeed or sin. Positive appraisals include parents' beliefs that the child is a blessing to show that the parents are worthy of taking care of such a child. Negative appraisals of what autism means and its etiology can cause increased stress in families of children with autism.

== Autistic culture ==
An autistic culture has emerged, accompanied by a number of movements and events that encourage greater tolerance of those with autism. Prominent movements include the autism rights movement and neurodiversity movement which seek to promote the idea that autism is a difference rather than a disease. Events include World Autism Awareness Day, Autism Sunday, Autistic Pride Day, Autreat, and others.

=== Autism rights movement ===
The autism rights movement, also known as the autistic culture movement or the neurodiversity movement, is a social movement within the context of disability rights that emphasizes the concept of neurodiversity, viewing the autism spectrum as a result of natural variations in the human brain rather than a disorder to be cured. The autism rights movement advocates a variety of goals, including greater acceptance of autistic behaviors; therapies that focus on coping skills rather than imitating the behaviors of neurotypical peers; the creation of social networks and events that allow autistic people to socialize on their own terms; and the recognition of the autistic community as a minority group.

Autism rights or neurodiversity advocates believe that the autism spectrum should be accepted as a natural expression of the human genome. This perspective is distinct from two other likewise distinct views: the medical perspective, that autism is caused by a genetic defect and should be addressed by targeting the autism gene(s), and fringe theories that autism is caused by environmental factors such as vaccines.

The movement is controversial in autism advocacy and research groups. A common criticism used against autistic activists is that the majority of them are "high-functioning" or have Asperger syndrome and do not represent the views of "low-functioning" autistic people and thus does not represent the wishes of the autism community as a whole, with certain individuals emphasizing their desire to be treated.

== See also ==
- Epidemiology of autism
- Societal and cultural aspects of autism
- Employment of autistic people
