= Sanna Malinen =

Finnish professor of psychology in New Zealand

Academic background
- Education: University of Canterbury, University of Otago
- Thesis: Implicit and explicit attitudes towards older workers: Their predictive utility and the role of attitude malleability (2009)
- Doctoral advisor: Lucy Johnston

Sanna Malinen is a Finnish–New Zealand psychology academic, and is a full professor at the University of Canterbury, specialising in social and organisational psychology.

== Academic career ==
Malinen is Finnish, and emigrated to New Zealand in 1996. Malinen completed a Bachelor of Arts at the University of Otago, followed by a Master of Science in psychology and a PhD at the University of Canterbury. Her doctoral thesis was titled Implicit and explicit attitudes towards older workers: Their predictive utility and the role of attitude malleability and was completed in 2009. Malinen then joined the faculty of the School of Business at University of Canterbury, rising to full professor in 2024. She works as part of the Workplace Analytics group with Professor Katharina Näswall. In 2013 Malinen was awarded the University of Canterbury School of Business and Economics Early Career Research award.

Malinen is an organisational and applied psychologist, and her research covers topics such as leadership development, and how to build resilience in workplaces and communities. She has researched what factors in team meetings enable better decision-making, and the concept of 'paradoxical leadership' in public organisations, defined as 'the ability to balance competing structural and relational demands over time'. Malinen is also interested in environmental psychology, including the use of values in environmental management and the connection between nature and wellbeing, and disaster management within organisations and communities. Malinen has collaborated on research on cultural and ecological resilience with Professor Jacinta Ruru of the University of Otago and Dr Phil Lyver of Manaaki Whenua – Landcare Research as part of the Biological Heritage National Science Challenge.

Malinen is married to an ecologist, and has two children.

== Selected works ==
- Kuntz, Joana R. C.; Katharina Näswall; Malinen, Sanna (2016). "Resilient Employees in Resilient Organizations: Flourishing Beyond Adversity". Industrial and Organizational Psychology: perspectives on science and practice. 9 (2): 456–462. doi:10.1017/iop.2016.39. Wikidata Q125520551.
- Kuntz, Joana R. C.; Malinen, Sanna; Katharina Näswall (2017). "Employee resilience: Directions for resilience development". Consulting Psychology Journal: Practice and Research. 69 (3): 223–242. doi:10.1037/cpb0000097. Wikidata Q125520553.
- Mark Hsueh; Kumar Yogeeswaran; Malinen, Sanna (2015). ""Leave Your Comment Below": Can Biased Online Comments Influence Our Own Prejudicial Attitudes and Behaviors?: Online Comments on Prejudice Expression". Human Communication Research. 41 (4): 557–576. doi:10.1111/hcre.12059. Wikidata Q127256206.
- Karen Tonkin; Malinen, Sanna; Katharina Näswall; Kuntz, Joana R. C. (2018). "Building employee resilience through wellbeing in organizations". Human Resource Development Quarterly. 29 (2): 107–124. doi:10.1002/hrdq.21306. Wikidata Q125520543.
- Katharina Näswall; Malinen, Sanna; Kuntz, Joana R. C.; Morgana Hodliffe (2019). "Employee resilience: development and validation of a measure". Journal of Managerial Psychology. 34 (5): 353–367. doi:10.1108/jmp-02-2018-0102. Wikidata Q125520565.
- Malinen, Sanna; Johnston, Lucy (2013). "Workplace ageism: discovering hidden bias". Experimental Aging Research. 39 (4): 445–465. doi:10.1080/0361073x.2013.808111. PMID 23875840. Wikidata Q50699383.
