= MOAS =

MOAS may refer to:

- Migrant Offshore Aid Station, a humanitarian search and rescue operation assisting vessels in distress in the central Mediterranean Sea
- Modified Overt Aggression Scale, a self-report inventory designed to measure aggressive behavior in youth and adults
