= Mitch Eisen =

Professor and researcher

Mitch Eisen is a professor and researcher in the field of forensic psychology. He holds the position of Director in the Forensic Psychology Graduate program at California State University Los Angeles and is best known for his research regarding eyewitness memory and eyewitness testimony.

== Education ==
Eisen received his PhD from University of Miami in counseling psychology with his thesis paper titled, "The Relationship Between Addictions in the Family of Origin and Hypnotic Susceptibility", overseen by Professor Herbert Dandes, as his first publication.

== Career ==
Eisen has been employed by California State University, Los Angeles since 1997 and currently serves as the department director for the Forensic Psychology graduate program. His position at the university is held within the College of Natural and Social Sciences in the Department of Psychology. In addition to his traditional work as a professor, Eisen also is the director of the university's Forensic Psychology Lab which includes both undergraduate and graduate students. Eisen has also served as an expert on eyewitness identifications in the California Supreme Court case People v Lemcke (2021). Most recently, Eisen was awarded with the Outstanding Professor Award (OPA) 2022-2023 at his current university.

== Research ==
Across his 50 publications (as of October 2025) including "Memory Accuracy After 20 Years for Interviews About Child Maltreatment" and "An Examination of Showups Conducted by Law Enforcement Using a Field-Simulation Paradigm", Dr. Eisen's research focuses on the memory and suggestibility of witnesses and their testimonies. With his fellow researcher, Gail Goodman, Eisen has also focused his research specifically on children and how their trauma and/or maltreatment affects their memory. His more recent research in relation to eyewitness memory is about replacing showups as an eyewitness identification method and enhancing lineups to reduce suggestibility as part of police investigations. A showup, as Eisen describes in his works, is a method of eyewitness identification where a witness is shown a single person in live time and is asked to identify as to whether or not they recognize the individual.

A large focus of Eisen's research in the past several years has been the concept of "showups", which are a highly influential means of questioning used by the police in an effort to have an eyewitness identify an individual. Eisen's research has shown the potential risks for eyewitness misidentification and subsequent false convictions and suggests replacing showups with less suggestive lineups.

In addition to his published research, Eisen also hosted a podcast entitled, "True Crime False Memory". He pulls from his personal research regarding eyewitness testimony and goes over a different criminal case in each episode giving an overview of the case and the significance of eyewitness testimony in each one. The podcast aired from August 2019 to May 2020 and has a total of 16 episodes.

=== Legal impact ===
Eisen's research has been cited in support of several proposed bills looking to end showups as a form of police questioning. Some of his other research focused on how the inclusion of gang evidence impacts jurors' overall memory of all of the evidence and how it impacts their decisions. This research influenced the creation of California State Law AB 333 which prohibits harmful character evidence of gang associations if gang-related activity isn't the crime.
