= Malinen =

Malinen is a Finnish surname.

== Geographical distribution ==
As of 2014, 89.8% of all known bearers of the surname Malinen were residents of Finland, 3.6% of Sweden, 1.4% of Russia, 1.3% of the United States, 1.1% of Australia and 1.1% of Estonia.

In Finland, the frequency of the surname was higher than national average (1:1,240) in the following regions:

1. Kainuu (1:165)
2. North Karelia (1:319)
3. Southern Savonia (1:653)
4. Central Finland (1:759)
5. Päijänne Tavastia (1:924)
6. Tavastia Proper (1:1,065)
7. Northern Savonia (1:1,221)

== People ==
- Juha Malinen (born 1958), Finnish football manager
- Jarkko Malinen (born 1988), Finnish ice hockey player
- Pekka Malinen (1921–2004), Finnish diplomat and politician
- Sanna Malinen, Finnish professor of psychology in New Zealand
