= Society of Consulting Psychology =

- Abbreviation: SCP
- Type: Professional association
- Purpose: Consulting psychology
- Members: 1,000+
- President: Amy Owen Nieberding
- Parent organization: American Psychological Association (Division 13)

The Society of Consulting Psychology (SCP) is a professional association of psychologists who are involved with consulting psychology. The society is the 13th division of the American Psychological Association. The Society (SCP) currently has over 1,000 members.

== Presidents ==
A number of distinguished psychologists have served as President of the Society including Donald Super, Albert Ellis, Orlo Crissey, Theodore Blau, Raymond Fowler, Thomas Backer, and Rodney Lowman. As of February, 2012, the president is Amy Owen Nieberding.

== History and activities ==
The society was founded as a division of APA whose members had to hold Fellow status in their respective areas of expertise. It has issued Guidelines for the training of psychologists in this field. According to the organization's website, its members "share an interest in the consultative process including applied activities, research and evaluation, and education and training." The society's journal, Consulting Psychology Journal: Practice and Research, is published four times per year. The society also hosts a popular mid-winter conference, entitled "Consulting to Business and Organizations", and provides programming at the annual convention of the APA.
