= Katharina Näswall =

Swedish professor of psychology in New Zealand

Academic background
- Thesis: Job insecurity from a stress perspective: antecedents, consequences, and moderators (2004)

Katharina Näswall (also Naswall) is a Swedish–New Zealand psychology academic, and is a full professor at the University of Canterbury, specialising in workplace psychology. Naswall is particularly interested in trying to make workplaces that are good for health and wellbeing of workers.

== Academic career ==
Näswall completed a PhD titled Job insecurity from a stress perspective: antecedents, consequences, and moderators at the Stockholm University in 2004. Näswall then joined the staff of Stockholm University. She moved to New Zealand in 2010, and joined the faculty of the School of Psychology, Speech and Hearing at the University of Canterbury, rising to full professor. Näswall is the Director of the Masters in Organisational Psychology programme at Canterbury, and co-leads the Workplace Analytics Research group with Professor Sanna Malinen.

Näswall's research is focused on trying to make work and workplaces that have a positive effect on the health and wellbeing of workers. She uses psychology and an understanding of human behaviour to study such topics as whether hybrid work affects burnout, how managers and organisations can make a positive difference to wellbeing, and whether workplaces with better psychological safety achieve better decision-making. Näswall has researched psychosocial recovery after disasters, and has also commented on the need for greater emphasis on manager training and resources in supporting employee wellbeing.

Näswall is on the editorial boards of the Scandinavian Journal of Work and Organizational Psychology and the journal Work and Stress.

== Selected works ==
- Magnus Sverke; Johnny Hellgren; Katharina Näswall (2002). "No security: a meta-analysis and review of job insecurity and its consequences". Journal of Occupational Health Psychology. 7 (3): 242–264. doi:10.1037/1076-8998.7.3.242. PMID 12148956. Wikidata Q34767342.
- Katharina Näswall; Hans De Witte (2003). "Who Feels Insecure in Europe? Predicting Job Insecurity from Background Variables". Economic and Industrial Democracy. 24 (2): 189–215. doi:10.1177/0143831x03024002003. Wikidata Q126515462.
- Katharina Näswall; Magnus Sverke; Johnny Hellgren (2005). "The moderating role of personality characteristics on the relationship between job insecurity and strain". Work & Stress. 19 (1): 37–49. doi:10.1080/02678370500057850. Wikidata Q126515463.
- Kuntz, Joana R. C.; Katharina Näswall; Malinen, Sanna (2016). "Resilient Employees in Resilient Organizations: Flourishing Beyond Adversity". Industrial and Organizational Psychology: perspectives on science and practice. 9 (2): 456–462. doi:10.1017/iop.2016.39. Wikidata Q125520551.
- Erik Berntson; Katharina Näswall; Magnus Sverke (2010). "The moderating role of employability in the association between job insecurity and exit, voice, loyalty and neglect". Economic and Industrial Democracy. 31 (2): 215–230. doi:10.1177/0143831x09358374. Wikidata Q126515473.
- Naswall, Katharina; Malinen, Sanna (7 February 2024). "Frustrated by tedious and unproductive meetings? These 2 proven strategies can help teams work smarter". The Conversation.
