= Autism in China =

In China, autism is known as 自闭症; zìbì zhèng ("self-enclosure disorder") or 孤独症; gūdú zhèng ("lonely disorder"). It is also common for autistic individuals to be metaphorically called 来自星星的孩子 ("children coming from the stars").

Current studies show that autism has a prevalence rate of around 1% among the Chinese population. There is evidence, though, that this number may be more significant due to under-diagnosis and general lack of awareness.

In China, autism was first recognized as a neurological disability in 2006. The country has passed a number of laws to ensure service provision and inclusion of autistic individuals. Currently, the diagnosis of autism in China adapts several international assessment tools and a procedure carried out by a psychiatrist.

Despite adhering to stringent international standards for diagnosis, autism is often misdiagnosed in China due to prevalent cultural beliefs. In comparison to the West, autism still remains a taboo subject. Children who are diagnosed with autism and their parents often face societal stigma. Those who are diagnosed with autism are often considered weak and a burden to society.

Public schools and special education schools are two possible paths for autistic children to receive education. Public schools often have a quota set for children with disabilities, however these are often extremely low. Therefore, due to a lack of professional training in autism intervention in those institutions and frequent rejections, most parents send their children to private treatment centres, which are costly. Children from rural communities and lower socioeconomic backgrounds often are neglected due to the lack of investment into governmental services to provide them with adequate care and education.

However, there are several non-governmental organizations (NGOs) in China established to provide autism intervention and parental training, as well as improving the emotional well-being for both the children and parents.

Finally, there has been increasing social support and media coverage of autism, as well as autism awareness songs and films in the past decade, particularly surrounding World Autism Awareness Day.

== Prevalence ==
Studies found the autism prevalence rate in China to be around 0.26% to 1%, which corresponds to about 3.9 million to 14.5 million out of 1.4 billion individuals.

However, many researchers, both domestic and international, suggested an underestimation, as:

1) most of these studies only included the population in special education schools and not in public schools, and

2) most of the studies did not use contemporary screening or diagnostic methods.

The underestimation is also related to under-diagnosis and misdiagnosis due to the lack of autism awareness amongst Chinese professionals, and especially psychiatrists. Other common reasons for misdiagnosis is include parental concealment and a persistent shortage of medical professionals in remote areas of the country.

Therefore, the estimated autism prevalence rate of 1% might be more accurate, and the percentage is increasing every year. Western countries (e.g. the United States) and other Asian countries (e.g. South Korea) have reported similar or higher autism prevalence rates and increasing trends.

== Societal stigma ==
In China, between 57% to 65% of the population has heard of autism according to a study. In comparison, 86% to 91% of the United States population has some understanding of the disorder.

The Chinese people often view the prevalence of autism in a negative light. According to many in the country, autism is not a neurodevelopmental disorder, but a contagious disease that is caught and can be cured over time. This viewpoint often results in parents being wrongfully blamed for allowing their child to get autism.

Furthermore, the disorder is often associated with the word "canfei" which roughly translates to worthlessness in Chinese. Language like this often devalues the life experiences of those who are diagnosed with autism and exacerbate the struggle of their families.

This lack of understanding can be directly attributed to the cultural expectations of Chinese society. Chinese communities often deeply respect achievement, good manners, and appropriate behavior as a result of Confucian tradition. Autism, however, describes behavior that is often contrary to these expectations. Behavior that doesn't result in conformity is often seen as bringing shame on their families. As a result, some parents who suspect their child has autism fear being ostracized and refuse to get their child diagnosed.

Due to limited conversation about autism in everyday life, teachers often label children who may present with behavioral challenges as naughty, playful, and unusual instead of recommending they are tested for autism. Chinese society shies aways from accepting autism as a serious disorder and chooses to assume symptoms are just a part of normal development.

== Laws related to rights of autistic individuals ==
Since the 1970s, the Government of China has been seeking to improve the conditions of people with disability. In 2006, the Chinese law officially recognized autism as a disability.
| Date of law passed | Name of law | Details |
|---|---|---|
| 1986 | "China Compulsory Education Law" (中华人民共和国义务教育法) | Requires public schools to accept students with disability. |
| 1990 | "The Law of the People's Republic of China on the Protection of Persons with Disabilities" (中华人民共和国残疾人保障法) | Aims for additional legislative protections for people with disability. |
| 1996–2000; 2001–2005; 2006–2010 | The Ninth, Tenth, and Eleventh "Five-year plans of China" (五年计划) | Plans of increasing services to people with disability (for more laws related, see disability in china). |
| 2006 | China's "Eleventh Five Year" Development Programme for the Disabled (中国残疾人事业"十一五"发展纲要) | Autism was officially recognized as a neurological disability. |
| 2008 | Amendments to "the Law of the People's Republic of China on the Protection of Persons with Disabilities" (中华人民共和国残疾人保障法) | States the nation's responsibility for "the rights of recovery, education, employment and social participation" of people with disability, which officially included people affected with autism. |

=== Shortcomings in the legal system ===
Despite legal recognition, those with autism face a variety of challenges both socially and economically. While government assistance is often available for people with disabilities, it is extremely limited; there is no national framework to support them. Only individuals whose diagnoses are considered serious enough are provided welfare. In most cases, this does not include individuals with autism.

China is a society which thrives on a collectivist work culture. Individuals diagnosed with autism are often classified as either patients or victims. While this may elicit pity towards them, it also often makes them seem unworthy of employment and a burden. The legal system does not protect autistic people from employment discrimination.

== Assessment and diagnosis ==
=== Progress and methods of assessment ===
Autism was first diagnosed in China in 1982 by Professor Táo Guótài (陶国泰) from Nanjing Brain Hospital presented the case in a Chinese journal. In the late 1980s, he introduced his findings to the global audience in English.

Before the introduction of the first national Mental Health Plan in 2002, there was no avenue for autism treatment through China's national health care system.

Since then, Chinese professionals have translated and used several international methods of assessment. Currently, the most common methods of assessment include the Chinese version of the Child Autism Rating Scale (CARS), the Autism Behavior Checklist (ABC), and the Chinese revised version of the Checklist for Autism in Toddlers (CHAT). Other methods of assessment include the Chinese versions of the Psycho-Educational Profile—or C-PEP (PEP), the Autism Diagnostic Observation Schedule (ADOS), and the Autism Diagnostic Interview-Revised (ADI-R).

It is also common for Chinese psychiatrists to diagnose a child as "having autism tendency" (also known as an "autism-like case", or 自闭症倾向) rather than directly as "autistic".

Due to advancements made in the diagnosis of autism in China, the average age children are diagnosed has significantly reduced to 2.8 years old. This has resulted in interventions starting at an earlier age of 3.3 years old.

=== Shortfalls in diagnosis ===
Children with early infantile autism are usually the only group who are officially diagnosed. The lack of trained psychiatrists and diagnosis service outside major cities contributes to this issue.

== Education and intervention ==
=== Special education schools ===
China has had a history of establishing special education schools since the early 1900s. However, the special education schools are mainly tailored toward deaf and blind students rather than those with cognitive and neurological conditions. Children with autism still face frequent rejections from both public and special education schools.

=== Private institutions ===
Because of the limitations of special education schools in China for autistic students, and the difficulty of them integrating into public schools, many families seek autism intervention from private organizations. Because these treatments are not state-run, they cost substantial amount of money. For instance, a 2013 study found that 90% of the families spend ¥7,000–¥10,000 (US$1,092.61– $1,560.87) monthly on average to support one autistic child. More specifically, it costs approximately ¥8,500 (US$1,326.99) in Beijing and ¥ 6,790 (US$1,060.03) in Qingdao monthly. Around 30% of parents reported that they cannot sustain this amount of financial burden for a prolonged period.

== Voluntary organizations and community support ==
=== Beijing Stars and Rain (北京星星雨） ===
Beijing Stars and Rain Institution is the first NGO established for autism in China. It was founded in 1993 by Tián Huìpíng (田慧萍). The institution runs training programs for both parents and children, and overall has a focus on applied behavior analysis. Beijing Stars and Rain Institution provides professional support for government departments and local intervention centres. The institution collaborates with many organizations such as One Foundation for charity works.

In 2012, Beijing Stars and Rain published the first report on medical support for Chinese autistic children in collaboration with Beijing Normal University. The report highlights the lack of institutional support and the high expense for treatment. The report also exposes that only 16.6% of the practitioners received adequate college training in the field.

=== Other voluntary organizations, funds or initiatives ===
The program 星光溢彩 (Xīng Guāng Yì Cǎi) is initiated by the China Social Welfare Foundation's Fund for Autistic Children (中国社会福利基金会自闭症儿童救助基金) in collaboration with Beijing Association for Rehabilitation for Autistic Children (北京市孤独症儿童康复协会). It aims at using art therapy for intervention, emotional care, and teaching life skills to autistic individuals. Currently, the art lessons incorporates fine art, singing, instruments, dance, floristry, gardening, etc.

=== Community support ===
The charity sale (义卖) of artworks by autistic children and charity concerts can be observed on World Autism Awareness Day in most major cities across China and above. This is done in collaboration of rehabilitation centres, businesses and schools. Often, the members of those institutions interact with autistic individuals or simply remain as the audience. Those events are often accompanied by awareness pamphlets or slogans and receive significant media attention.

== Popular media coverage ==
=== Films ===
- Children of the Stars (2007) (来自星星的孩子): documentary about the lives of autistic children in China.
- Ocean Heaven (2010) (海洋天堂): about a single father, terminally ill with five months to live, trying to teach his son David life skills and finding a residence for him.
- In 2012, Beijing Stars and Rain set up a fundraiser named Ocean Heaven Project (海洋天堂计划) based on the film. It is done in collaboration with One Foundation.

=== Songs ===
- "Moms of Stars" (2014) (星星的妈妈): song by Huazi.
