= Joana Kuntz =

New Zealand psychologist

Academic background
- Education: University of Tennessee System, ISPA – University Institute

Joana Coelho Kuntz is a New Zealand academic, and is a full professor in the School of Psychology, Speech and Hearing at the University of Canterbury, specialising in organisational and employee resilience, diversity and inclusion, and managing organisational change.

== Academic career ==
Kuntz completed a PhD at the University of Tennessee and then worked in organisational development in America and Europe. Kuntz moved to New Zealand to join the faculty of the School of Psychology, Speech and Hearing at the University of Canterbury in 2009, rising to full professor in 2024. Kuntz's research covers employee and organisational resilience, leadership development, managing organisational change, and diversity and inclusion. She is interested in how resilience is measure and assessed for individuals and organisations. Kuntz is a co-founder of Canterbury's Employee Resilience Research group, who work with government agencies and companies to improve resilience after the Christchurch earthquakes. One of Kuntz's students examined the relationship between the resilience of employees and the resilience of their organisation. Kuntz has also published on the stressors reported by workers during the COVID-19 pandemic. She also commented on why workers might be more willing to accept pay cuts to help businesses stay afloat during the pandemic. Kuntz is also interested in the future of work.

In 2011 Kuntz was awarded an Erskine Fellowship, an academic exchange programme at the University of Canterbury. In 2013 she was nominated for lecturer of the year.

== Selected works ==
- Karen Tonkin; Malinen, Sanna; Katharina Näswall; Kuntz, Joana R. C. (2018). "Building employee resilience through wellbeing in organizations". Human Resource Development Quarterly. 29 (2): 107–124. doi:10.1002/hrdq.21306. Wikidata Q125520543.
- Kuntz, Joana R. C.; Malinen, Sanna; Katharina Näswall (2017). "Employee resilience: Directions for resilience development". Consulting Psychology Journal: Practice and Research. 69 (3): 223–242. doi:10.1037/cpb0000097. Wikidata Q125520553.
- Kuntz, Joana R. C.; Katharina Näswall; Malinen, Sanna (2016). "Resilient Employees in Resilient Organizations: Flourishing Beyond Adversity". Industrial and Organizational Psychology: perspectives on science and practice. 9 (2): 456–462. doi:10.1017/iop.2016.39. Wikidata Q125520551.
- Kuntz, Joana R. C.; J. R. Kuntz; Detelin Elenkov; Anna Nabirukhina (2012). "Characterizing Ethical Cases: A Cross-Cultural Investigation of Individual Differences, Organisational Climate, and Leadership on Ethical Decision-Making". Journal of Business Ethics. 113 (2): 317–331. doi:10.1007/s10551-012-1306-6. Wikidata Q125520544.
- Joana R.C. Kuntz; Jorge F.S. Gomes (2012). "Transformational change in organisations: a self‐regulation approach". Journal of Organizational Change Management. 25 (1): 143–162. doi:10.1108/09534811211199637. Wikidata Q122212578.
