= The Psychologist-Manager Journal =

- Discipline: Psychology
- Language: English
- Edited by: Elizabeth L. Blickensderfer, Elizabeth H. Lazzara

Publication details
- Publisher: American Psychological Association (United States)
- Frequency: Quarterly

Standard abbreviations
- ISO 4: Psychol.-Manag. J.

Indexing
- ISSN: 1088-7156 (print); 1550-3461 (web)

Links
- Journal homepage

The Psychologist-Manager Journal was a quarterly peer-reviewed academic journal established in 1997 by the Society of Psychologists in Management. In 2022, it was renamed Psychology of Leaders and Leadership. The journal is published by the American Psychological Association.

The journal has several areas to which manuscripts may be submitted. These areas include:

- Management Principles: The Theory of Management
- Live from the Firing Line: The Practice of Management
- Research Tools for the Psychologist-Manager
- Book Reviews and Other Submissions

== Editors ==
The journal's founding editor was Rodney L. Lowman (Alliant International University), who edited the journal from 1997 to 2003. He was succeeded by Rosemary Hays-Thomas (University of West Florida), who served through 2007. The current editors are Peter Harms and Christina Frederick

== Abstracting and indexing ==
The journal is abstracted and indexed in PsycINFO/Psychological Abstracts and within EBSCO databases.
