= Bellak =

Bellak (Hungarian: Bellák) is a surname. Notable people with the surname include:

- George Bellak (1919–2002), American television writer;
- James Bellak (1813–1891), American musician;
- Laszlo Bellak (1911–2006), Hungarian table tennis player;
- Leopold Bellak (1916–2000), American psychologist.
