= Eron =

Eron may refer to:

- Eron Riley (born 1987), American football wide receiver
- Eron Hodges, front office executive for the 2018 Purdue Boilermakers football team
- Leonard Eron (1920–2007), American psychologist
- Keith Van Eron (born 1955), American soccer goalkeeper
- Eron (footballer, born 1992), Eron Santos Lourenço, Brazilian football left-back
- Eron (footballer, born 1998), Eronildo dos Santos Rocha, Brazilian football forward
