= Bruce Wampold =

American psychologist

Bruce Edward Wampold
- Born: November 25, 1948 (age 77); Olympia, Washington
- Education: University of Washington, University of Hawaiʻi, University of California, Santa Barbara
- Known for: Research into psychotherapy
- Awards: 2007 Distinguished Professional Contributions to Applied Research Award from the American Psychological Association
- Scientific career
- Fields: Psychology
- Workplaces: University of University of Wisconsin–Madison
- Thesis: The relationship between the cognitive organization and the classroom behavior of elementary school children (1981)
- Doctoral advisor: Donald R. Atkinson

Bruce E. Wampold (born November 25, 1948) is Emeritus Professor of Counseling Psychology at the University of Wisconsin–Madison. and Director of the Research Institute at Modum Bad Psychiatric Center, Vikersund, Norway.

== Education ==
Wampold received his B.A. in mathematics from the University of Washington, his M.Ed. in educational psychology from the University of Hawaiʻi, and his Ph.D. in counseling psychology from the University of California, Santa Barbara. He is a licensed psychologist and Board Certified by the American Board of Professional Psychology and has an Honorary Doctorate from Stockholm University.

== Work in psychotherapy ==
Wampold is known for developing the contextual model of psychotherapy, which constitutes an alternative to the prevailing theory of the effectiveness of psychotherapy, known as the medical model.

== Awards and honors ==
- Fellow of the American Psychological Association,
- Award for Distinguished Professional Contributions to Applied Research from the American Psychological Association
- Distinguished Research Career Award, Society for Psychotherapy Research.
- Wisconsin Alumni Research Foundation Named Professor
