= ISPA – Instituto Universitário =

Private university in Lisbon, Portugal

ISPA University Institute
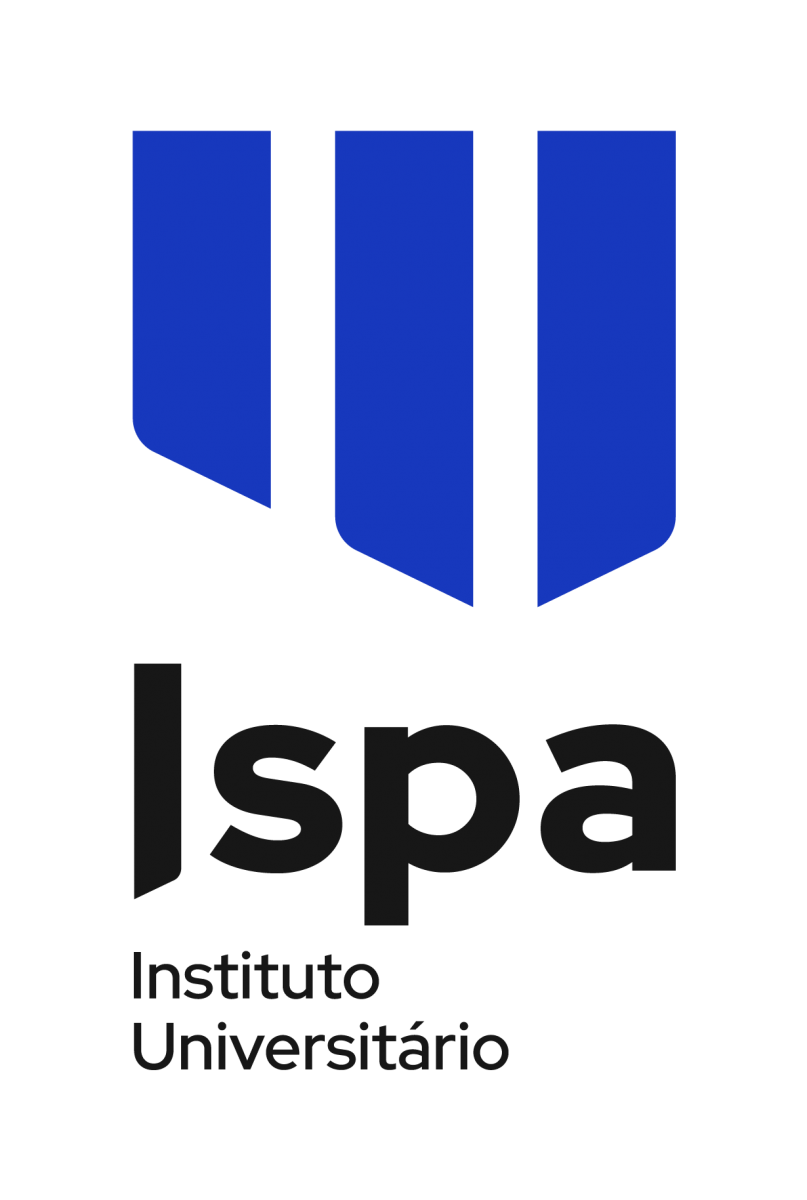
- Motto: Sapere Aude
- Motto in English: "Dare to Know"
- Type: Private research university
- Established: 1962; 64 years ago
- Chairman: Rui Oliveira
- Location: Lisbon, Portugal; 38°42′44″N 9°07′33″W
- Colors: Royal blue and black (2021-)
- Website: www.ispa.pt

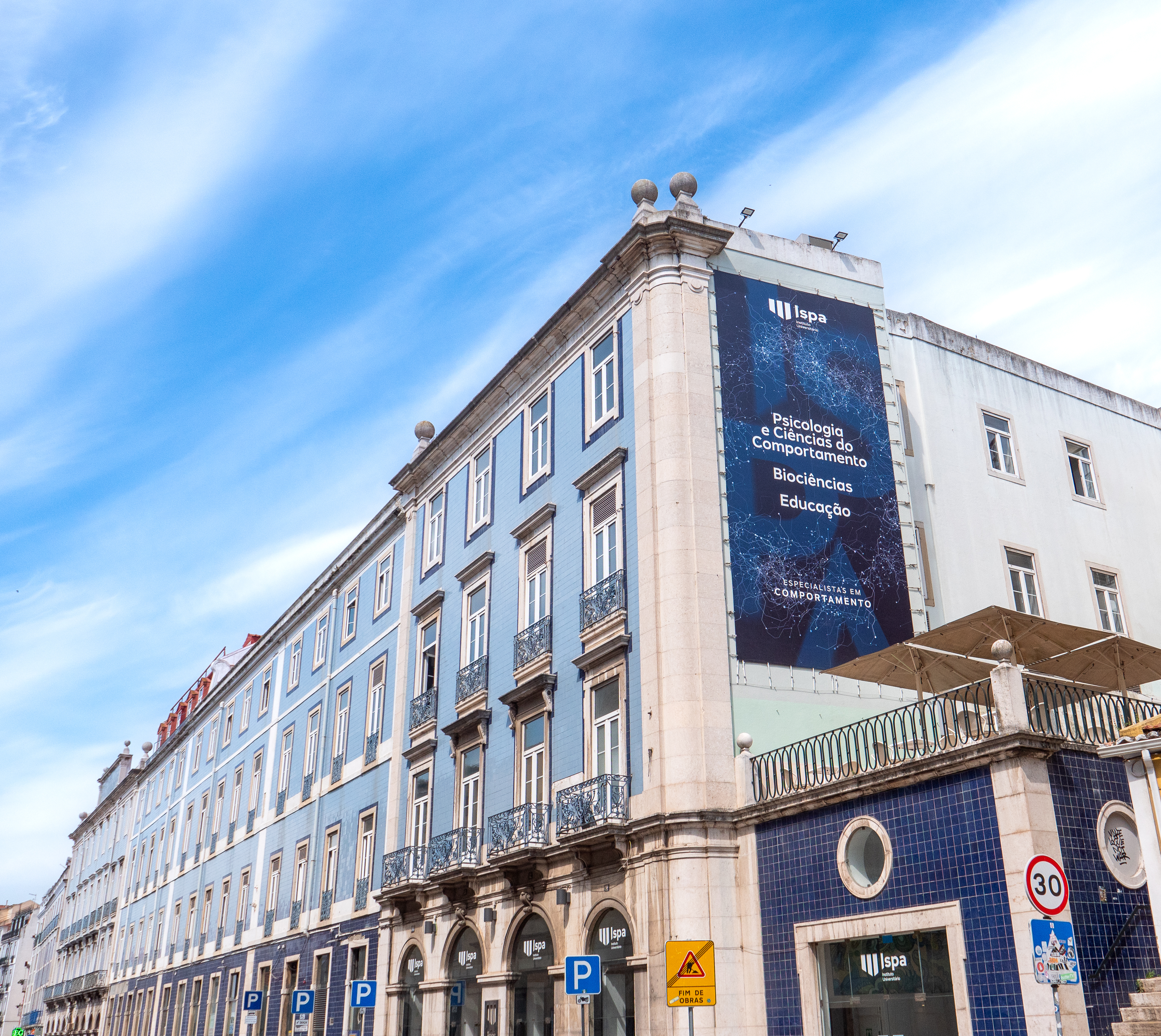
ISPA facade

ISPA – Instituto Universitário (English: Institute of Applied Psychology, officially Instituto Universitário de Ciências Psicológicas, Sociais e da Vida MH) is a private research university institute located in Lisbon. Founded in 1962 as Instituto de Ciências Psicopedagógicas, it was the first institution of higher education in the area of psychology in Portugal. According to the Academic Ranking of World Universities, ISPA is among the top 400 universities in the world in the field of psychology.

== History ==
ISPA began its activity in 1962 under the name of Instituto de Ciências Psicopedagógicas. The inauguration of the Institute took place on November 7, 1962, and the training offer included four sections: three on Applied Psychology (Pedagogical Psychology, Clinical Psychology and Industrial Psychology) and one on Theology.

It came to adopt the designation of Instituto Superior de Psicologia Aplicada in 1964. In 1977, the founding responsibility of the ISPA teaching establishment began to be ensured by a cooperative.

In the 80s, it would occupy its current premises in the historic center of the city of Lisbon. A Support Center emerged in the city of Beja, designated ISPA – BEJA, which had about 150 students and offered only the Degree in Applied Psychology, with specialization in the area of Educational Psychology. ISPA-Beja operated until the mid-2000s.

It is also during this period that the School of Postgraduate Studies was created and the first master's courses in Portugal in the fields of Ethology, Psychoanalytic Psychology, Organizational Behaviour, Psychosomatics or Environmental Psychology began.

Throughout the 1980s and 1990s, the development of a network of association protocols with European and Brazilian universities took place.

The consolidation of the ISPA project resulted, in 2009, in its reconversion into a University Institute, within the framework of the new organizational model of higher education introduced by the legal regime of higher education institutions. ISPA began to independently teach all the academic degrees foreseen in the framework of the organization of studies introduced by the Bologna Process (1st Cycles-Bachelors, 2nd Cycles-Masters, Integrated Masters, 3rd Cycles-PhDs), also expanding its training in areas, such as biosciences.

ISPA Biosciences Center was created in 2009 and, in 2010, the Degree in Biology began to operate as well as the Master in Marine Biology and Conservation in 2013.

On September 20, 2013, ISPA received the Psychology Prize awarded by the Order of Portuguese Psychologists (OPP).

In 2021, a protocol was signed with the Municipality of Cascais for the transfer of facilities in Penedo.

On January 26, 2023, it was awarded the rank of Honorary Member of the Order of Public Instruction.

== Training provided ==
It currently teaches Degrees in the areas of Psychology, Biology and Basic Education (a course that resulted from the partnership with ESEI – Maria Ulrich that existed until the academic year 2019–2020), as well as the Integrated Master in Psychology at ISPA (which is only in operation for students who entered this modality until the academic year 2020–2021).

ISPA also offers Masters in Clinical Psychology, Educational Psychology, Social and Organizational Psychology, Community Psychology, Health Psychology, Forensic Psychology, Developmental Psychology and Psychopathology, Marine Biology and Conservation, Preschool Education, Preschool Education – School and Teaching of the 1st Cycle of Basic Education and, in partnership with the Catholic University of Portugal, master's degrees in Neuropsychology and Cognitive neurosciences and Behavioral neuroscience.

It also teaches Doctorates in Psychology, Behavioral Biology, Integrative Biology and Biomedicine in partnership with the Gulbenkian Institute of Science and Universidade Nova de Lisboa, Education in partnership with Universidade Nova de Lisboa and the International Doctoral Program in Neurosciences in partnership with the Champalimaud Foundation and the New University of Lisbon.

== Research ==
The institution develops scientific research activities in the area of Psychology, Biology and Education. It currently has Research and Development Units of the Foundation for Science and Technology, such as:

- CIE – Education Research Center
- APPsyCI – Applied Psychology Research Center Capabilities & Inclusion
- WJCR – William James Center for Research, in partnership with the University of Aveiro
- MARE – Center for Marine and Environmental Sciences, in partnership with the University of Lisbon, University of Coimbra, University of the Azores, University of Évora, New University of Lisbon and the University of Madeira.
- IBB – Integrative Behavioral Biology Group, an internal group of the Instituto Gulbenkian de Ciência

== University extension ==
ISPA develops university extension activities that cover the transfer of knowledge and technology, lifelong learning and commitment and social involvement:

- ISPA Training
- ISPA clinic
- Documentation Center

== Alumni ==
- Anabella
- Antonio Ramalho Eanes
- Carmelinda Pereira
- Grade Kilomba
- Manuel Custódia
- Maria Kol
- Joana Kuntz
- Pedro Dantas da Cunha
- Ricardo Serrão Santos
- Rita Redshoes
