= Donald R. Atkinson =

American psychologist (1940–2008)

Donald Ray Atkinson
- Born: February 11, 1940; Union City, Indiana
- Died: January 11, 2008 (aged 67); Jackson County, Oregon
- Resting place: Santa Barbara Cemetery
- Education: Baraboo High School; Wisconsin State College-La Crosse; University of Wisconsin-Milwaukee; University of Wisconsin-Madison
- Known for: Multicultural counseling psychology
- Children: James Fredrick Atkinson (1966-1992); Robert Kenneth Atkinson (1969-Present)
- Awards: 2001 Distinguished Career Contributions to Research Award from section 17 of the American Psychological Association; 2005 Leona Tyler Award from section 45 of the American Psychological Association
- Scientific career
- Fields: Counseling psychology
- Institutions: University of California, Santa Barbara
- Thesis: The effect of using selected behavior modification techniques to increase student-initiated action on counselor suggested activities (1970)
- Doctoral students: Bruce Wampold

Donald Ray Atkinson (February 10, 1940, in Union City, Indiana–January 11, 2008, in Santa Barbara, CA) was an American counseling psychologist and professor at the University of California, Santa Barbara (UCSB). He was known for his extensive work in multicultural counseling psychology. He was the director of training for UCSB's Counseling Psychology Program for ten years (1979–1989), and previously as Assistant Dean of the Department of Education there for four years (1975–1979). Atkinson grew up in Baraboo, Wisconsin and graduated from Baraboo High School. He served in the United States Navy for two years. He wrote a book about Baraboo: "Baraboo: A Selective History." He also wrote other books and articles about counseling. He died from pancreatic cancer in Jackson County, Oregon. He retired from the faculty of UCSB in 2002.
