= Abraham Zaleznik =

Psychoanalyst

Abraham Zaleznik (1924–2011) was a leading scholar and teacher in the field of organizational psychodynamics and the psychodynamics of leadership.

At the time of his death he was a Professor Emeritus at the Harvard Business School where he taught for four decades.

He was a practicing psychoanalyst and the author of 16 books.

== Biography ==
Zaleznik taught at the Harvard Business School for four decades. He authored 16 books and over forty articles. Beginning in the 1960s he studied at the Boston Psychoanalytic Society and Institute. In 1971 he was certified as a clinical psychoanalyst, a rare achievement at a time when most psychoanalytic institutes trained physicians only. He saw patients in a psychoanalytic private practice for 20 years. In 1981 he met Konosuke Matsushita, the founder of the Matsushita Electric Industrial Company, on a trip to Japan. The latter established a chair in leadership at the Harvard Business School, which Zaleznik occupied until his retirement. Zaleznik served on corporate boards, consulted to many businesses, and was an early contributor to the formation of the International Society for the Psychoanalytic Study of Organizations. He died at the age of 87. At the time of his death he had two grown children and five grandchildren. His wife of 66 years, Elizabeth, died two years earlier in 2009.

He graduated from Alma College and Harvard Business School.

== Work ==
Zaleznik was among the founders, along with Harry Levinson, of a school of thought that integrated leadership and organization studies with psychoanalysis.

He published an article, "Managers and Leaders: Are They Different?" which established a theme he continued to explore throughout his scholarly career.

He was a critic of what he called "the managerial orientation" which led managers and executives to focus on process, rather on the substance of their work. He followed up this article with an important book, published in 1989, The Managerial Mystique: Rediscovering Leadership in Business, which explored this theme in depth. He did not subscribe to the idea that there were leadership competencies. Rather, he believed that leaders were animated by distinctive talents, describing them as various forms of "imagination" for example, the financial imagination and the marketing imagination. Theodore Levitt, a major theorist of marketing, was influenced by Zaleznik's idea.

Zaleznik emphasized that character above all shaped how leaders took up their roles. He was among the few scholars who could link how leaders decided and what decisions they took to their character forming experiences. His case book Learning Leadership: Cases and Commentaries On Abuse of Power in Organizations, is based on many biographical essays of such historical figures as Andrew Carnegie, Henry Ford, Coco Chanel and Jimmy Hoffa. In his classic article "The Management of Disappointment" he argued that leaders are twice born, the second birth, the result of their navigating a major career disappointment.

== Influences ==
Zaleznik was deeply influenced by what is called the "ego psychology" school of psychoanalysis. In this school of thought, character emerges from the compromises a person makes between the demands of reality and his or her drives and desires, what Freud called "the Id." This point of view led Zaleznik to discount any idealization of "leadership" and to see leaders as people who have, through psychological conflict and struggle, found a way to express their passions in the context of difficult choices where resources are limited. This meant of course that every leader had his or her significant limitations. This point of view led Zaleznik to be skeptical of the Organization development tradition that highlighted how leaders could facilitate the human potential of followers. He was similarly skeptical that "participatory leadership" could resolve the inherent dilemmas of command and control in organizations.

== Selected publications ==
- Zaleznik, A., Hodgson, R., Levinson, D., The Executive Role Constellation; An Analysis of Personality and Role Relations in Management, Boston: Harvard University, 1964
- Zaleznik, A., "The Management of Disappointment," Harvard Business Review, Nov-Dec, 1967
- Zaleznik, A., “Power and Politics in Organizational Life”, Harvard Business Review, May-June, 1970
- Zaleznik, A., Kets de Vries, M., Power and the Corporate Mind, Boston: Houghton Mifflin, 1975
- Abraham Zaleznik, A., "Managers and Leaders: Are They Different?" Harvard Business Review, May–June 1977.
- Zaleznik, A., The Managerial Mystique: Restoring Leadership in Business, New York: Harper & Row, 1989.
- Zaleznik, A., Learning Leadership: Cases and Commentaries on Abuses of Power in Organizations, Chicago, Ill. : Bonus Books, 1993
- Zaleznik, A., Hedgehogs and Foxes : Character, Leadership, and Command in Organizations New York: Palgrave Macmillan, 2008.
- Zaleznik, A., Executive's guide to understanding people: How Freudian Theory can turn Good Executives into Better Leaders, New York: Palgrave Macmillan, 2009.
