= Leonard A. Jason =

American psychologist

Leonard A. Jason is a professor of psychology at DePaul University in Chicago, Illinois, where he also directs the Center for Community Research. His chief professional interests include the study of myalgic encephalomyelitis/chronic fatigue syndrome (ME/CFS), violence prevention, smoking cessation, and Oxford House recovery homes for substance abuse. Jason's interest in ME/CFS began when he was diagnosed with the condition in 1990 after having mononucleosis.

== Early life and education ==
Leonard A. Jason is the son of Jay Jason, a well known comedian who entertained in the Catskills Mountains. Jason received a B.A. in psychology from Brandeis University in Waltham, Massachusetts in 1971 and a Ph.D. in psychology from the University of Rochester in Rochester, New York in 1975.

== Career ==
Jason is a former president of the Division of Community Psychology of the American Psychological Association (APA) and a past editor of The Community Psychologist. Jason has edited or written 28 books, and he has published over 800 articles and 100 book chapters on CFS, ME, recovery homes, the prevention of alcohol, tobacco, and other drug abuse, media interventions and program evaluation. He has served on 92 Thesis Committees (of which he chaired 64), and 102 Dissertation Committees (of which he chaired 52). He has served on the editorial boards of ten psychological journals. Jason has served on review committees of the National Institutes of Health, and he has received over $36,000,000 in federal research grants. He was also a board member and vice-president for a scientific professional organization called the International Association of CFS/ME.

He was a member the Chronic Fatigue Syndrome Advisory Committee. In 1999, Jason published an epidemiological study of ME/CFS among United States adults. Jason helped organize two major American Psychological Association sponsored conferences on research methods for community psychology and co-edited a book on this topic.

Jason has served on the editorial boards of journals including:

- Journal of Community Psychology, 1983–1986, 2007–present.
- Prevention in Human Services, 1986–1995; renamed Journal of Prevention and Intervention in the Community, 1996–present.
- Journal of Health Psychology, 2008–present.
- Fatigue: Biomedicine, Health & Behavior, 2013–present.
- The Journal of Primary Prevention, 1983–2007. Appointed Associate Editor, 1986–2007.
- Special Services in the Schools; renamed Journal of Applied School Psychology 1984–2008.
- American Journal of Community Psychology, 1978–1991. Appointed Associate Editor, 1983–1987.
- Professional Psychology, 1978–1991.
- Behaviorists for Social Action, 1983–1990.
- Journal of Applied Behavior Analysis, 1986–1991.

== Honors and awards ==
In 1991, Jason was provided the Ethnic Minority Mentorship Award from the Society for Community Research and Action. He received in 1997 the Distinguished Contributions to Theory and Research Award from the Society for Community Research and Action. He was presented the 1997 CFIDS Support Network ACTION Champion Award by the Chronic Fatigue Immune Dysfunction Syndrome Association of America. He was presented in 1998 with DePaul University's Cortelyou–Lowery Award for Excellence. He received the Dutch ME Foundation International ME Award in 2003. In 2007, he received the Special Contribution to Public Policy Award from the Society for Community Research and Action. He was awarded the 2011 Perpich Award by the International Association for Chronic Fatigue Syndrome/Myalgic Encephalomyelitis (IACFS/ME) for distinguished community service. Also in 2011, he was presented with the Tom Fellows Award by the Oxford House Organization for 20 years of research documenting the process of long term recovery from addiction. In 2013, Jason was presented with the DePaul University's College of Science and Health's Excellence in Research Award. In 2015, he was presented the American Psychological Association’s award for Distinguished Professional Contributions to Applied Research.

== Bibliography ==
=== Selected publications ===
- Jason, A.; Olson, D.; Ferrari, R.; Majer, M.; Alvarez, J.; Stout, J. (July 2007). "An examination of main and interactive effects of substance abuse recovery housing on multiple indicators of adjustment". Addiction. 102 (7): 1114–1121. doi:10.1111/j.1360-0443.2007.01846.x. ISSN 0965-2140. PMC 2976482. PMID 17567399.
- Jason, A.; Benton, C.; Valentine, L.; Johnson, A.; Torres-Harding, S. (April 2008). "The Economic impact of ME/CFS: Individual and societal costs". Dynamic Medicine. 7 6. doi:10.1186/1476-5918-7-6. PMC 2324078. PMID 18397528.
- Jason, L. A.; Najar, N.; Porter, N.; Reh, C. (2009). "Evaluating the Centers for Disease Control's Empirical Chronic Fatigue Syndrome Case Definition". Journal of Disability Policy Studies. 20 (2): 93. CiteSeerX 10.1.1.508.1082. doi:10.1177/1044207308325995. S2CID 71852821.
- Jason, L.A.; Stevens, E.; Ram, D. Miller; Beasley, C.R.; Gleason, K. (2016). "Theories in the field of community psychology" (PDF). Global Journal of Community Psychology Practice. 7 (2): 1–27.
- Jason, L.A.; McManimen, S. L.; Sunnquist, M. L.; Newton, J. L.; Strand, E. B. (2017). "Clinical criteria versus a possible research case definition in chronic fatigue syndrome/myalgic encephalomyelitis". Fatigue: Biomedicine, Health & Behavior. 5 (2): 89–102. doi:10.1080/21641846.2017.1299077. PMC 5650200. PMID 29062593.
- Jason, L.A.; Stevens, E. (2017). "The reliability and reciprocity of a social network measure". Alcoholism Treatment Quarterly. 35 (4): 317–327. doi:10.1080/07347324.2017.1355220. PMC 6145821. PMID 30245544.
- Jason, L.A. (2017). "To serve or not to serve: Ethical and policy implications". American Journal of Community Psychology. 60 (3–4): 406–413. doi:10.1002/ajcp.12181. PMID 28921637.
- Jason, L.A.; Fox, P.A.; Gleason, K. D. (2018). "The importance of a research case definition". Fatigue: Biomedicine, Health & Behavior. 6: 52–58. doi:10.1080/21641846.2018.1389336.

=== Selected books ===
- Jason, LA; Fennell, P; Taylor, RR, eds. (2003). Handbook of chronic fatigue syndrome. New York: John Wiley & Sons, Inc. ISBN 978-0-471-41512-1.
- Jason, LA; Ferrari, JR; Davis, MI; et al., eds. (2006). Creating communities for addiction recovery: The Oxford House model. Taylor & Francis, Inc. ISBN 978-0-7890-2930-0.
- Jason, L.A.; et al. (2008). Rescued lives: The Oxford House approach to substance abuse. New York: Routledge. ISBN 978-0-7890-3631-5.
- Jason, L.A., & Glenwick, D.S. (Eds.) (2012). Methodological Approaches to Community-Based Research. Washington, DC: American Psychological Association. Retrieved 4 July 2018.
- Jason, L.A. (2013). Principles of Social Change.. New York, NY: Oxford University Press. Retrieved 1 July 2018.
- Jason, L.A. & Glenwick, D.S. (Eds.). (2016). Handbook of Methodological Approaches to Community-Based Research: Qualitative, Quantitative, and Mixed Methods.. New York, NY: Oxford University Press. Retrieved 1 July 2018.
