= Catherine Lord (psychologist) =

American autism researcher (born 1950)

Catherine Lord (born 1950) is an American psychologist and researcher. She currently serves as a member of the International Advisory Board for The Lancet Psychiatry, as co-chair of the Scientific Research Council of the Child Mind Institute, and as the George Tarjan Distinguished Professor of Psychiatry and Education at the Semel Institute for Neuroscience and Human Behavior at UCLA.

Lord is credited for co-developing the Autism Diagnostic Observation Schedule (ADOS) and the Autism Diagnostic Interview-Revised (ADI-R), which are together considered the "gold standard" tools for diagnosing autism spectrum disorder (ASD).

Lord is also known for leading one of the largest and longest-running longitudinal studies of autism and related developmental conditions in modern research. Started in 1990, her longitudinal study of autism has followed a community sample of over 200 individuals, initially referred to community clinics for early autism evaluations as young children, and their families, for nearly 30 years. She has authored hundreds of peer-reviewed journal articles and more than 10 books about autism through this study and others.

== Career ==
Lord received her B.A. in Psychology from UCLA in 1971, and her PhD in Psychology from Harvard in 1976.

From 2012 to 2018, she was professor of psychology at Weill Cornell Medical College.

In 2017, Lord joined Tilray's Medical Advisory Board.

She is also professor emerita of psychology and psychiatry at the University of Michigan, where she was formerly the director of the University of Michigan Autism and Communication Disorders Center.

Lord currently directs the Lord Lab at UCLA, where she serves as the George Tarjan Distinguished Professor of Psychiatry in the David Geffen School of Medicine and as a senior research scientist in the Semel Institute for Neuroscience and Human Behavior. There, she is the principal investigator of several studies, including the longitudinal study of autism. She also mentors a small group of PhD candidates, postdoctoral researchers, and clinical trainees.

== Awards and honors ==
Lord has received a considerable number of awards and recognitions throughout her career.

In 2010, she was awarded the APA Award for Distinguished Professional Contributions to Applied Research.

In 2011, she received the award for Distinguished Scientific Contributions to Clinical Psychology (Society of Clinical Psychology)

In 2017, she received the Sarnat Prize in Mental Health from the National Academy of Medicine.

In 2018, Lord was elected a member of the American Academy of Arts and Sciences.

In 2019, she was awarded the Lifetime Achievement Award from the International Society for Autism Research.

In 2020, she received the Bob Smith Award for Research on Assessment from the Society of Clinical child and Adolescent Psychology (Division 53 of the American Psychological Association)
