= Modified Overt Aggression Scale =

Assessment tool for aggressive behavior

- Purpose: evaluate frequency of aggressive episodes

The Modified Overt Aggression Scale (MOAS) is a four-part behavior rating scale used to evaluate and document the “frequency and severity” of aggressive episodes. The rating scale is made up of four categories; verbal aggression, aggression against objects, aggression against self, and aggression against others. Each category consists of five responses, which over time can track the patient's aggressive behavior. The MOAS is one of the most widely used measures for violence and aggression.

The scale was originally intended for use by physicians in a clinical setting, but parents may also use it to track aggressive behaviors in their children over time. It is particularly helpful in assessing aggressive behaviors in patients with traumatic brain injury (TBIs).

== Development and history ==
The test was originally designed to measure aggression in psychiatric inpatients, specifically those with autism and other intellectual disabilities. The scale is generally used to track aggression and aggressive acts over time, typically at one week intervals. It has since been used to measure the efficacy of therapy and drug treatments on aggressive behavior in clinical settings. The test has since been translated into Italian, Chinese, and French. The scores of the scale have reported good reliability and validity across multiple study samples.

In a study conducted by Chinese researchers in 2009, the Modified Overt Aggression Scale was found to be both reliable and valid. The results from the study concluded there was high reliability, meaning the scale consistently measures the levels of aggression in each category. The MOAS is also confirmed to be valid, meaning the scale truly measures what it is supposed to.

In 2009, a study conducted by Ira L. Cohen and her associates studied characteristics, such as aggressiveness, in people with intellectual disabilities (IDs). The MOAS was used and researchers reported it being "a reliable and valid measure of aggressiveness in this population."

It is also found to be valid for measuring aggression in developing countries, in addition to the developed world, where it was originally validated.

== Limitations ==
The original version of scale was found to have problems with its scoring methods, leading some psychologists to see it as not reliable. Such suggestions led to revisions of the scale.

There were a few problems with the study conducted in China to test reliability and validity. The participants were psychiatrists familiar with the scale, so their pre-existing knowledge could have skewed the results. The study was conducted on a small number of people, meaning its results cannot be generalized to the whole population. These factors contributed to a limited and specific sample size that may have altered the results of this study, questioning the accuracy of the reliability and validity.

The study conducted about people with IDs had minor limitations. Their standards of autistic traits were based on clinical information, instead of standard measures set by the Autism Diagnostic Interview-Revised. Based on the large sample size of over 2,000 people though, it is not considered a major complication.
