= W. Grant Dahlstrom =

American psychologist

William Grant Dahlstrom (1922–2006) was an American psychologist who worked on the Minnesota Multiphasic Personality Inventory.

He received the APA Award for Distinguished Professional Contributions to Applied Research in 1991 and the Bruno Klopfer Award in 1994. In 1969 he won the Anisfield-Wolf Book Award with E. Earl Baughman for their study Negro and White Children: A Psychological Study in the Rural South.
