= Lydia Giberson =

Canadian-born psychiatrist (1899–1994)

- Born: June 1, 1899; Bath, New Brunswick, Canada
- Died: April 7, 1994 (aged 94); Orange, California, U.S.
- Education: McGill University, Neurological Institute of New York
- Occupation: Psychiatrist (Industrial psychiatry)
- Years active: 1932–1960
- Employer: Metropolitan Life Insurance Company
- Spouse: Jacques Deane

Lydia Gertrude Giberson (June 1, 1899 – April 7, 1994) was a Canadian-born psychiatrist. She was employed by the Metropolitan Life Insurance Company in New York City from 1932 until her retirement in 1960. She was the first woman assistant vice president of Metropolitan Life.

== Early life and education ==
Lydia Giberson was born in Bath, New Brunswick, Canada. She attended the University of Alberta in Edmonton as an undergraduate. In 1928 she graduated from the McGill University Faculty of Medicine in Montreal, Quebec. She interned in neurology at the Neurological Institute of New York and did postgraduate studies in psychiatry at the Emma Pendleton Bradley Hospital in East Providence, Rhode Island.

== Career ==
Lydia Giberson began working for the Metropolitan Life Insurance Company as a psychiatrist in 1932. In 1922 Metropolitan Life had become the first American company to employ a full-time psychiatrist. Giberson was the third person, and the third woman, to hold the position. Augusta Scott was the staff psychiatrist from 1922 to 1926, followed by Anne T. Bingham, who died in 1932.

Giberson later moved from the company's medical to its personnel department. During the Second World War she acted as a consultant to the United States Public Health Service and the Office for Emergency Management. Shortly before her retirement in 1960 Giberson became the Metropolitan Life Insurance Company's first woman assistant vice president, an accomplishment which earned her the title of New York State's outstanding professional woman of the year.

During her career at Metropolitan Life Lydia Giberson published 70 journal articles and book chapters. She organized the American Psychiatric Association's first symposium on industrial psychiatry, which was held in 1939. She originated the concept of "emotional first aid" as an intervention for employees suffering from relatively minor emotional problems. In an address to an industrial medicine conference in New York in 1953, Giberson was quoted as saying that she did not consider "industrial psychiatry an exact science, but rather, 'an emotional first aid station'". This concept was later built upon by other practitioners and theorists, including Harry Levinson. She was the first woman associate editor of the Journal of Industrial Medicine and the first woman fellow of the American Association of Industrial Medicine. Her professional papers are held in the archives of the University of California, San Francisco.

== Later life ==
In 1960 Lydia Giberson and her husband Jacques Deane retired to Santa Barbara, California. After his death in 1967 she moved to the Leisure World community in Laguna Woods, California, where she became a community leader, serving on boards and committees and spearheading community organizations such as Meals on Wheels and Planned Parenthood. Lydia Giberson died in Orange, California on 7 April 1994.
