= Harry Levinson =

American psychologist

Harry Levinson (1922 – June 26, 2012) was an American psychologist and consultant in work and organizational issues. He was a pioneer in the application of psychoanalytic theory to management and leadership. He linked the failure of managers to effectively contain the anxieties of workers to employee depression and low productivity.

== Biography ==
Levinson was born in Port Jervis, New York on January 16, 1922. His parents were both immigrants. His father was a tailor, and his mother was a homemaker. He was the oldest of three children. He grew up in a time when anti-Semitism was prevalent, a barrier he overcame in his quest to become a teacher and writer. Although his beginnings were modest, he would become one of the most influential consulting psychologists of his time.

From an early age he loved reading and writing and won his first writing award when he was in the seventh grade. Levinson received his B.S. degree (1943) and his M.S. degree (1947) from Emporia State University. He received his clinical training and completed his PhD (1952) at the University of Kansas from a joint clinical psychology program operated with the Topeka Veteran's Administration and the Menninger Clinic.

In the 1950s, Levinson played a key role in the reformation of the Kansas state hospital system, creating the Division of Industrial Mental Health of The Menninger Foundation in 1954. During the academic year 1961–62 he was a visiting professor at the Sloan School of Management at the Massachusetts Institute of Technology and in 1967 at the School of Business at the University of Kansas.

In 1968 he moved to the Harvard Graduate School of Business, and simultaneously established The Levinson Institute which he headed until he retired in 1992. The aim of the institute was to develop a psychoanalytic approach to the practice of management and a deeper understanding of leadership and its role in organizational processes. From 1968 to 1972 Levinson was the Thomas Henry Carroll-Ford Foundation distinguished visiting professor in the Harvard Graduate School of Business Administration.

Levinson was a Ford Foundation visiting professor at the H. C. Mathur Institute of Public Administration in Jaipur, India, in the summer of 1974. He was a visiting centennial professor at Texas A&M in April 1976, and in September 1979 conducted the international course on occupational social psychiatry for the Finnish Government Institute of Occupational Health, under the sponsorship of the Nordic Council of Ministers.

Levinson headed the Kansas Psychological Association and the Kansas Advisory Committee to the U.S. Civil Rights Commission. He was active throughout his life with the Society of Consulting Psychology, the International Society for the Psychoanalytic Study of Organizations (ISPSO), of which he was a founding member, and the Society of Psychologists in Management which he helped found in 1985. Levinson played a "learned role" at each symposium of the International Society for the Psychoanalytic Study of Organizations during its early years. He constantly challenged psychoanalytic organizational theorists to summarize what they had learned, and articulate where they were going in their work. He was an Honorary Associate at the Center for the Study of Organizational Change from 2010 until his death.

He married his first wife, Roberta, in 1946 and they divorced in 1970. They had four children together. He met his second wife, Miriam in 1989. Together they founded the Harry and Miriam Levinson Scholarship offered by the American Psychological Foundation and the Harry Levinson Scholarship in Organizational Behavior at Emporia State. They remained married until his death.

Levinson began losing his eyesight in 2001 due to macular degeneration. Although he could no longer read or write, he continued to consult with colleagues and students by phone. Harry Levinson died at the age of 90 on June 26, 2012. He was buried in the railway town of Port Jervis where he was born.

=== Awards ===
- Perry L. Rohrer Consulting Psychology Practice Award for outstanding achievement in psychological consultation, 1985
- Massachusetts Psychological Association's Career Award, 1985
- Award of The Society of Psychologists in Management, 1985
- Organization Development Professional Practice Award for Excellence from the American Society for Training and Development, 1988
- I. Arthur Marshall Distinguished Alumnus Award of The Menninger Alumni Association, 1990
- American Psychological Association Award for Distinguished Professional Contributions to Knowledge, 1992
- American Psychological Foundation Gold Medal for Life Achievement in the Application of Psychology, 2000

== Work ==
Levinson's contributions to the theory and practice of psychological organizational consulting were "extensive, relentless, and legendary." Levinson was known for his insightful and practical approach to the workplace, and he was responsible for raising awareness about the emotional well-being of workers.

His contributions, especially to the psychoanalytic study of organizations, are summarized by Diamond (2003). The 2003 article contains a detailed bibliography of Harry Levinson's work which is summarized here. Levinson consistently argued for a psychoanalytic approach to studying organizations, but was ultimately concerned with the application of theory to practice.

- Emotional First Aid : Levinson's conceptualization of the need for emotional support for workers in industry paved the way for today's employee assistance programs. The concept of "emotional first aid" had earlier been developed by the Metropolitan Life Insurance Company's staff psychiatrist, Lydia Giberson, to denote interventions for employees suffering from relatively minor emotional problems.
- The Psychological Contract : The concept of a psychological contract is useful for understanding the expectations that workers and organizations have of each other. Levinson's definition includes conscious and unconscious dimensions of the investment that employees make in their relationships with the organizations that they work for. Understanding of the psychological contract is an important function of management and crucial for avoiding detachment and poor performance by workers. The concept is a useful tool for understanding management failure. The notion of the psychological contract was influenced by psychoanalytic thinking including the ego ideal.
- Psychological Anthropology : Levinson's conceptualization of psychoanalytic anthropology is clear in his emphasis on immersion and participant observation in psychoanalytic organizational consultation. He believed that to know an organization a researcher/consultant must have knowledge and experience from inside of it. Organizational fieldwork includes observing, participating, and interviewing. The goal is to understand how workers and organizations relate to one another in the course of doing work. Psychoanalytic concepts such as transference and countertransference contribute to an understanding of relational dynamics, workplace culture, and worker effectiveness.
- Management by Guilt : Levinson directly addressed the guilt associated with employee evaluations at work. He explicated the psychodynamics of managerial guilt and outlined the criteria for effective feedback, even when it was negative.
- People Learning in Institutions : In writing about worker motivation Levinson highlights three human needs: Ministration is the need for support and guidance. Maturation needs center on creativity and reality testing. Mastery needs are focused on achievement and ambition. Awareness of these needs can help managers improve their dialogue with and responsiveness to workers.
- Problem Analysis : Levinson developed a psychoanalytic framework for diagnosing relational problems in the workplace. The framework centers on the ego ideal of the worker, specifically the extent to which workers view themselves as living up to their ideal. Other important elements of the diagnostic process include attending to workers' need for close relationships in the workplace as well as dependency needs. This framework is influenced by both drive theory and ego psychology.
- Organizational Diagnosis : Levinson's 1972 book is perhaps his most significant contribution to the theory and practice of psychoanalytic organizational diagnosis and change. It is an integration of systems and clinical models. The notion of organizational diagnosis places emphasis on understanding the manifest and latent aspects of organization's culture and practices before initiating change efforts or other interventions. Of particular importance is the emphasis on analyzing the transference dynamics between consultants and organizational members.
- Loss in Organizational Change : Levinson drew attention to loss as a part of organization change. He suggested that workers experience loss and grief in response to changes, even when they are positive. He equated resistance to change to the process of mourning, promoting a more compassionate and mindful approach to change efforts. Management attention to the pain experienced by workers during change is important for identifying and addressing conscious and unconscious sabotage of organizational change.
- The Great Jackass Fallacy (1973) : A psychoanalytic approach to understanding motivation in the workplace illuminates the problems associated with a management style that relies on carrots and sticks to motivate workers. Specifically, Levinson points out that such an approach relies on the "rational economic man" model, ignoring the complex and often unconscious nature of human motivation. It also ignores the "sentient" field of work (see also Czander, 1993, The Psychodynamics of Work and Organizations: Theory and Application).

== Contemporaries ==
Harry Levinson's contemporaries are influential organizational theorists in their own right. At Harvard, Levinson interacted with Abraham Zaleznik (Harvard Business School), Chris Argyris (Education and Business Schools), and Michael Maccoby (Project on Character, Work, and Technology). Levinson also interacted with Edgar Schein, Donald Schon, and John Van Maanen at MIT. Rodney L. Lowman and Richard R. Kilburg worked with Levinson in association with the APA and in particular the division on Consulting Psychology.

The integration of organizational and psychoanalytic theory was the primary aim of the International Society for the Psychoanalytic Study of Organizations (ISPSO) which was founded in the early 1980s. Many of the psychoanalytic theorists who were Levinson's contemporaries were at the Tavistock Institute of Human Relations in London including Isabel Menzies Lyth, Otto Kernberg, John Bowlby, Elliott Jaques, and Harold Bridger.

Harold Bridger, Abraham Zaleznik, and Harry Levinson were active in the ISPSO in its first decade during the time that Michael Diamond was president. Leopold Gruenfeld of Cornell University sponsored the first two meetings of what became ISPSO in the early 1980s. Levinson and Zaleznik were seen as the pioneers or patriarchs of the psychoanalytic approach to studying organizations. Levinson's intellect and sharp criticisms challenged and inspired a new generation of organizational theorists including Manfred F.R. Kets de Vries, Larry Hirschhorn, Laurence Gould, Tom Gilmore, James Krantz, Howard Schwartz, Seth Allcorn, Shelley Reciniello, Gilles Amado, Michael A Diamond, and Donald M. Levine.

== Major publications ==
- Men, Management, and Mental Health (1962)
- Emotional Health in the World of Work (1964)
- Executive (1968, 1981)
- Organizational Diagnosis (1972)
- The Great Jackass Fallacy (1973)
- Psychological Man (1976)
