= Oxford House =

System of rehabilitation centres

The term Oxford House refers to any house operating under the "Oxford House Model", a community-based approach to addiction recovery, which provides an independent, supportive, and sober living environment. Today there are nearly 3,000 Oxford Houses in the United States and other countries.

Each house is based on three rules:

- No use of drugs or alcohol and no disruption
- The house must be run democratically
- Pay the Equal Expense Shared (EES) cost or any fines

Equal Expense Shared (EES) is generally between 80 and 160 dollars a week and includes utilities. A certain number of AA meetings a week may be mandatory. Weekly business meetings are mandatory to discuss any issues that the house may be facing. It is at these meetings that checks are written for bills and residents are made aware of where they stand financially.

The first Oxford House was opened in Silver Spring, Maryland in 1975 by Paul Molloy. Molloy had been a Senate committee staff member between 1967 and 1972. He sought treatment for his alcoholism in a halfway house in 1975. Later that year, the halfway house would close due to financial difficulty, and Molloy and the other residents took over the lease. They chose the name Oxford House in recognition of Oxford Group, a religious organization that influenced the founders of AA.

== Oxford House information ==
- The goal is the provision of housing and rehabilitative support for the alcoholic or drug addict who wants to stop drinking or using and stay sober.
- All houses are run on a democratic basis. Officers serve periods of no longer than six months in any one office.
- No member of an Oxford House is asked to leave without cause following the 30-day probationary period—a dismissal vote by the membership because of drinking, drug use, disruptive behavior, or non-payment of EES (Equal Expenses Shared, aka what others call rent).
- Oxford House is not affiliated with Alcoholics Anonymous and Narcotics Anonymous, organizationally or financially, but Oxford House members realize that only active participation in Alcoholics Anonymous and/or Narcotics Anonymous offers assurance of continued sobriety.
- Each Oxford House is autonomous except in matters affecting other houses or Oxford House, Inc., as a whole.
- Each house is financially self-supporting although financially secure houses may provide new or financially needy houses a loan for a term not exceeding one year.
- Members who leave an Oxford House in good standing are encouraged to become associate members and offer friendship, support, and example to newer members.

== Business meetings ==
Business meetings are the core of Oxford House. All decisions are made based upon a vote by all members of the house. A typical Oxford House has five positions, however each person still has only one vote. These positions are:

- The President calls the meeting to order, directs the meeting, moderates discussion, and closes the meeting.
- The Treasurer is responsible for keeping a financial accounting for all matters involving the house. This includes the house's current resources and any bills that must be paid.
- The Comptroller keeps an account of the amount of money each person owes to the house each week. The "comptroller's report" is read openly each meeting.
- The Chore Coordinator assigns weekly chores to each member of the house. Also reports on any fines, for violating the House rules, that have been written that week, and discusses any general housekeeping matters that need to be attended to.
- The Secretary keeps a record of the minutes of each meeting, and reads the minutes from the previous week at the beginning of each meeting.

== DePaul University Research on Oxford House ==
DePaul University's Center for Community Research, led by Dr. Leonard A. Jason, has been involved in a research study of Oxford House since 1988. It was found that the characteristics of people living in an Oxford House did not vary significantly from people in other substance abuse programs. The primary reason cited for moving into an Oxford House was companionship and the enforcement of a sober living environment. Approximately three quarters of the residents involved in the study were involved with the Alcoholics Anonymous program. The average stay was about 175 days, and over a two-year period 69% of those interviewed self-reported that they stayed in the house or left on good terms. The paper stated that:

- These findings suggest that the Oxford House model, in comparison to those who solely attend twelve-step programs, might be more effective in empowering residents in their ongoing abstinence in a way that enhances the perception of control in their lives.

== Additional Research ==
- Jason, L. A.; Davis, M. I.; Ferrari, J. R. (2007). "The need for substance abuse after-care: Longitudinal analysis of Oxford House". Addictive Behaviors. 32 (4): 803–818. doi:10.1016/j.addbeh.2006.06.014. PMID 16843612.
- Jason, L. A.; Davis, M. I.; Ferrari, J. R.; Bishop, P. D. (2001). "Oxford house: A review of research and implications for substance abuse recovery and community research". Journal of Drug Education. 31 (1): 1–27. doi:10.2190/TMNP-M3CC-BUPN-9EE6. PMID 11338963. S2CID 552089.
- Jason, L. A.; Ferrari, J. R. (2010). "Oxford house recovery homes: Characteristics and effectiveness". Psychological Services. 7 (2): 92–102. doi:10.1037/a0017932. PMC 2888149. PMID 20577571.
- Jason, L.A., Ferrari, J.R., Davis, M.I., & Olson, B.D. (2006). Creating communities for addiction recovery: The Oxford House model. New York: Haworth.
- Jason, L. A., Olson, B. D., & Foli, K. (2008). Rescued lives: The Oxford House approach to substance abuse. New York: Routledge.

== See also ==
- Addiction recovery groups
