= Luciano L'Abate =

Italian psychologist (1928–2016)

Luciano L'Abate (September 19, 1928 – April 8, 2016) was an Italian psychologist who worked in the United States. He was the father of relational theory and author, co-author, editor or co-editor of more than 55 books in the field of American psychology.

== Early life and education ==
Luciano L’Abate was born in Brindisi and educated in Florence, Italy. He came (1948) to the US as an exchange student under the auspices of the Mennonite Central Committee to Tabor College in Hillsboro, Kansas from which he graduated with high honors in two years with majors in English and Psychology (1950). After receiving a UNESCO scholarship at Wichita State University where he received a M.A.(1953), he earned a Ph.D. from Duke University (1956). After working for two years as a clinical psychologist at the Pitt County Health Department (Greenville, NC) and teaching in the extension division of East Carolina College (now University) (1956–57), he received a USPHS postdoctoral fellowship in child psychotherapy at Michael Reese Hospital, Chicago, Illinois (1958–59).

== Career ==
After this training, he became assistant professor of psychology in the Department of Psychiatry at Washington University School of Medicine, St. Louis, Missouri (1959–64). Moved to Atlanta, Georgia when he became Associate Professor and Chief Psychologist in the Child Psychiatry division of the Department of Psychiatry at Emory University School of Medicine (1964–65). He served as a professor of psychology at Georgia State University (GSU) since 1965, where he was Director of the Family Psychology Training Program and the Family Study Center. He later retired as Professor Emeritus of Psychology from GSU in December 1990.

His academic and professional recognitions and honors included serving as a Diplomate and Examiner of the American Board of Professional Psychology; Fellow and Approved Supervisor of the American Association for Marriage and Family Therapy; Fellow of Divisions 12 and 43 of the American Psychological Association. Life Member of American Orthopsychiatric Association. Charter Member of the American Family Therapy Academy. Past member of the National Council on Family Relations. Co-founder and past president of the International Academy of Family Psychology. Charter Member of the American Association for the Advancement of Preventive Psychology. Worked for 25 years as Abstractor for Psychological Abstracts. His work has been translated in Argentina, China, Denmark, Finland, French-Canada, Germany, Italy, Japan, South Korea, and Poland.

== Lectures ==
L'Abate lectured extensively in Australia, Canada, New Zealand, Japan, Germany, Spain, and Italy. He gave workshops in many states of the Union, Australia, Canada, and New Zealand. Visiting professor to American and foreign institutions: in 1991 at the University of Santiago de Campostella (Spain) in May, in July 1991 at the University of British Columbia in Vancouver (Canada), In August 1991, he was the keynote speaker for the German National Conference in Developmental Psychology at the University of Cologne, and lectured at LMU Munich, the University of Padua, and the Center for the Family in Treviso (Italy) in September of the same year.

In 1992 invited Keynote Speaker for the 10th Anniversary Conference of the Japanese Association of Family Psychology at Showa Women's University (Tokyo), giving additional workshops on prevention for the Yasuda Life Welfare Foundation of Japan, and one workshop on “Love and Intimacy” for the Tokyo Family Therapy Institute. Invited to lecture at the Universities of Bari and Padova (Italy) in July 1994 and as keynote speaker for the Second International Congress of Family Psychology. In November 1994 keynote speaker for the annual conference of the Penn Council on Relationships, formerly the Philadelphia Marriage Council. In May 1996 lectured at the Universities of Urbino, Rome, Catholic University of Milan, Padua, and Bari. In October 1999, he lectured at the Catholic University of Milan, the Scientific Institute “La Nostra Famiglia” in Lecco, and the Universities of Bari and Padua. In October 2000, he lectured and gave workshops to mental health organizations and educational institutions in Warsaw, Kraków, Lublin, Poznan, and Rzeszow, Poland.

In June 2002 and December 2003, he lectured in various clinical institutions in and around Milan, Italy, the Catholic University of Milan, and the Universities of Padua and Bari, as well as professional, post-graduate schools in Mestre (Venice) and Florence. On 28 October 2006 he received the Renoir Prize from the University of Lecce for outstanding contribution to psychological sciences, lecturing there as well as in the Chemistry and Psychiatry Departments at the University of Bari. In October 2007, he lectured at the Catholic University of Milan and the University of Padua. He gave workshops at a counseling convention in Milan and in a post-doctoral specialization program in Prato. He was featured as main speaker at a Symposium at the University of Bari on “Science, Mind, and Creativity” sponsored by the Graduate School and the Departments of Physics, Chemistry, and Psychiatry. On October 10, 2008, he was the keynote speaker for the Second Conference on Wellness & Writing Connections in Atlanta, Georgia.

He had a full-time clinical practice 1956-1964 and a part-time clinical practice from 1965 to 1998. He served as a consultant to Cross-Keys Counseling Center in Forest Park, GA from 1978 to 1998. From 1993 to 1998, he was a Clinical Director for Multicultural Services in a mental health center for ethnic communities developed jointly by Cross Keys Counseling Center and a local Presbyterian church (Doraville, GA).

In 1996, he founded “Workbooks for Better Living,” to make available to qualified professionals low-cost, self-help mental health workbooks through the Internet http://www.mentalhealthhelp.com. He has produced more than 100 workbooks, of which eight have been translated into Spanish. These workbooks were published by Springer-Science in 2011.

== Later life ==
After retirement from clinical practice (December 1998), he has taught one course on Personal Writing for senior citizens, and was a volunteer with the Diversification Program of DeKalb County Juvenile Court from 1999 to 2003. Late in his career Dr. L’Abate became involved and help found the Society for Technology and Psychology, as a possible Division 57 of the American Psychological Association.

Of particular significance is his Relational Competence Theory: Research and Mental Health Applications (1st Edition) by Luciano L'Abate, Claudia Scilletta, Mario Cusinato, Walter Colesso, Eleonora Maino Hardcover - June 2010. In this book, L'Abate shows how relational competence theory complements other theories that place an individual's personality and functioning into the complete context of the family.

Prior to his death he was involved in full-time writing and research and lectured internationally, most recently in Tokyo, Japan in August 2013.

Dr. L'Abate died April 8, 2016, in Atlanta, Georgia, U.S.A.

== Honors and awards ==
Awarded the 1983 GSU Alumni Distinguished Professorship in the School of Arts and Sciences. Named “Outstanding Citizen” by the House of Representatives in the State of Georgia in 1984. In 1986 received the “Outstanding Achievement and Service” award by the Tabor College Alumni Association. In 1987 received recognition by the Georgia Association for Marriage and Family Therapy for “Outstanding Contribution.” Named “Family Psychologist of the Year for 1994″ by Division 43 (Family Psychology) of the American Psychological Association at its annual meeting in New Orleans in 1995. In 2003 received a medal from the President of the University of Bari (Italy) for “Outstanding Achievement.” On October 28, 2006, he was awarded the Renoir Prize at the University of Lecce (Italy) for creative and outstanding contributions to humanity. In 2009 Dr. L’Abate received the APA Award for Distinguished Professional Contributions to Applied Research from the American Psychological Association.

== Publications ==
Formerly on Editorial Boards of national and foreign professional and scientific journals. Consultant also to various publishing houses. Author and coauthor of over 300 papers, chapters, and book reviews in professional and scientific journals. Author, published (written, co-written, edited, and co-edited) over 50 books. His work has been translated into Chinese, Danish, Finnish, French-Canada, German, Japanese, Korean, Polish, and Spanish languages. Four books have been published in his native Italy. Two are used as textbooks in the Department of General Psychology at the University of Padova.

1964. Principles of clinical psychology. New York: Grune & Stratton (Translate in Argentina), 1968.

1975. with L. T. Curtis. Teaching the exceptional child. Philadelphia: W. D. Saunders.

1976. Understanding and helping the individual in the family. New York: Grune & Stratton.

1977. Enrichment: Structured interventions with couples, families, and groups. Washington, D. C.: University Press of America.

1977. with Bess L. L'Abate. How to avoid divorce: Help for troubled marriages. Atlanta, GA. John Knox Press. (translated into French in Quebec, Canada)

1981. with G. Rupp. Enrichment: Skill training for family life. Washington, D. C. University Press of America.

1982. with J. C. Hansen. Approaches to family therapy. New York: Macmillan.

1982. with G. Weeks. Paradoxical therapy: Theory and practice with individuals, couples, and families. New York: Brunner/Mazel (translated into Chinese, Finnish, German, Japanese, Polish, and Italian).

1982. Editor. Values, ethics, and legalities in family therapy. Rockville, MD: Aspen Publications.

1983. Family psychology: Theory, therapy, and training. Washington, D. C. University Press of America.

1983. with S. McHenry. Handbook of marital interventions. New York: Grune & Stratton.

1985. Editor. Handbook of family psychology and therapy. Volumes I & II. Pacific Grove, CA: Brooks/Cole.

1985. with R. S. Sauber, and G. Weeks. Family therapy: Basic concepts and terms. Rockville, MD: Aspen Publications.

1985. Editor, with M. Milan. Handbook of social skills training and research. New York: Wiley.

1986. Systematic family therapy. New York: Brunner/Mazel.

1986. with G. Ganahl and J. C. Hansen. Methods of family therapy. Englewood Cliffs, NJ: Prentice-Hall.

1987. Family psychology II: Theory, therapy, enrichment, and training, Washington, D. C. : University Press of America. (pp. 1–289).

1987. with S. E. Weinstein. Structured enrichment programs for couples and families. New York: Brunner/Mazel (pp. 1–505).

1987. with L. Young. Casebook of structured enrichment programs for couples and families. New York: Brunner/Mazel (pp. 1–387).

1990. Building family competence: Primary and secondary prevention strategies. Newbury Park, CA: Sage. Published also as: Le risorse della famiglia: Prevenzione primaria e secondaria con famiglie. Bologna, Italy: Il Mulino.

1992. Programmed writing: A self-administered approach for interventions with individuals, couples, and families. Pacific Grove, CA: Brooks/Cole.

1992. Editor, with J. E. Farrar and D. A. Serritella (Eds.). Handbook of differential treatments for addictions. Needham Heights, MA: Allyn & Bacon.

1993. with D. A. Bagarozzi. Sourcebook of marriage and family evaluation. New York: Brunner/Mazel.

1993. with S. R. Sauber, G. Weeks, & W. Buchanan. Dictionary of family psychology and family therapy. Thousand Oaks, CA: Sage.

1994a. A theory of personality development. New York: Wiley. Translated in Italy, Edizioni Borla, Rome.

1994b. Editor, Handbook of developmental family psychology and psychopathology. New York: Wiley.

1994c. Family evaluation: A psychological interpretation. Thousand Oaks, CA: Sage. Translated in Korean, 2003.

1997. The self in the family: Toward a classification of personality, criminality, and psychopathology. New York: Wiley. (Italian translation, 2000) Milan: Francangelo).

1998. Editor. Family Psychopathology: The relational roots of dysfunctional behavior. New York: Guilford.

2001. Editor, Distance writing and computer-assisted interventions in psychiatry and mental health. Westport, CT: Ablex. 2002. Beyond psychotherapy: Programmed writing and structured computer-assisted interventions. Westport, CT: Ablex.

2003. Family Psychology III: Theory-building, theory-testing, and psychological interventions. Lanham, MD: University Press of America.

2003. with Piero De Giacomo. Improving intimate relationships: Integration of theoretical models with preventions and psychotherapy applications. Westport, CT: Praeger.

2004a. A guide to self-help mental health workbooks for clinicians and researchers. Binghamton, NY: Haworth.

2004b. Editor. Using workbooks in prevention, psychotherapy, and rehabilitation: A resource for clinicians and researchers. Binghamton, NY: Haworth.

2005a. Personality in intimate relationships: Socialization and psychopathology. New York, NY: Springer-Science.

2005b. with N. Kazantzis, F. P. Deane, K. R. Ronan. (Edis). Using homework assignments in cognitive behavior therapy. New York; Routledge.

2007. with N. Kazantzis (Eds.). Handbook of homework assignments in psychotherapy: Theory, research, and prevention. New York: Springer.

2007. (Editor). Low-cost interventions to promote physical and mental health: Theory, research, and practice, New York: Springer.

2008. Sourcebook of interactive exercises in mental health. New York: Springer.

2008. (Editor). Toward a science of clinical psychology: Laboratory evaluations and interventions. Hauppauge, NY: Nova Science Publishers.

2009. The Praeger Handbook of Play across the Life Cycle: Fun from infancy to old age. Westport, CT: Greenwood Publications.

2009. With Mario Capitelli, Piero De Giacomo, & Savino Longo (Eds). Science, mind, and creativity: The Bari Symposium. New York: Nova Science Publishers.

2010. With T. Harwood. Self-help in Mental Health: A Critical Evaluation. New York: Springer-Science.

2010. With Mario Cusinato, Eleonora Maino, Walter Colesso, & Claudia Scilletta. Relational Competence Theory: Research and Applications in Mental Health. New York: Springer-Science.

2011. Sourcebook of interactive exercises in mental health. New York: Springer-Science.

June 2011. The Seven Sources of Pleasure. Westport, CT: Praeger.

September 2011. Hurt Feelings in Intimate Relationships: Theory, Research, and Applications. New York: Cambridge University Press.

October 2011. With Laura Gail Sweeney (Eds). Research on writing approaches in mental health. Birney, UK: Emerald Group Publications Limited.

2012. With Mario Cusinato (Eds). Advances in Relational Competence Theory: With special attention to alexithymia. New York: Nova Science Publishers.

2012. With David A. Kaiser (Eds). Handbook of technology in psychology, psychiatry, and neurology: Theory, research, and practice. New York: Nova Science Publishers.

2012. Editor. Paradigms in Theory Construction. New York: Springer-Science.

August 2012. Clinical Psychology and Psychotherapy as a Science. New York: Springer-Science.

2014. With Lisa Hooper, Giovanna Gianesini, Peter J. Jankowski, and Laura Gail Sweeney. Models of Psychopathology: Generational processes and relational roles. Springer-Science.
