= Consulting psychology =

Consulting psychology is a specialty area of psychology that addresses such areas as assessment and interventions at the individual, group, and organizational levels. The Handbook of Organizational Consulting Psychology provides an overview of specific areas of study and application within the field. The major journal in the field is Consulting Psychology Journal: Practice and Research. Consulting psychologists typically work in business or non-profit organizations, in consulting firms or in private practice. Consulting psychologists are typically professionally licensed as psychologists.

== Defining consulting psychology ==
The American Psychological Association defines the fields as:

"Consulting psychology shall be defined as the function of applying and extending the specialized knowledge of a psychologist through the process of consultation to problems involving human behavior in various areas. A consulting psychologist shall be defined as a psychologist who provides specialized technical assistance to individuals or organizations in regard to the psychological aspects of their work. Such assistance is advisory in nature and the consultant has no direct responsibility for its acceptance. Consulting psychologists may have as clients individuals, institutions, agencies, corporations or other kinds of organization."

Consultation should help individuals and organizations "become more efficient and effective."

== Models of consultation ==
=== Generic ===
The generic model encompasses all kinds of consulting, starting with Entry, moving through Diagnosis and Implementation and ending with an explicit Disengagement.

=== Client-centered ===
This approach focuses on an individual client (recipient of service) and helps service providers better help that client. The consultant functions assesses the client, makes a diagnosis and recommends changes to the consultee, typically a teacher, physician or other care providers.

=== Consultee-centered ===
This relationship focuses on the consultee rather than a particular client, helping build new skills via training and/or supervision. The consultant typically does not meet clients directly. Consultees seek consultation to increase knowledge, skills, confidence, and/or objectivity.

=== Consultee-centered administrative consultation ===
In some cases, the focus is on administrative rather than professional staff. Such relationships are typically longer term.

=== Behavioral consultation model/behavioral-operant ===
In this model, the consultant is an authority figure who assumes primary responsibility for the relationship. The focus is on problem-solving more than skills development or a particular client.

=== Organization consultation ===
This model employs systems theory to improve productivity or to streamline the relationship between an organization and its environment.

=== Statistical consultation ===
A model that focuses on having statistical consultants to research empirical evidence and sophisticated analysis through consulting test and certified projects.

=== Litigation and risk management ===
A model used by behavioral scientists who works in jury thought and decision making processes. They are usually reserved to help attorneys and insurance companies to evaluate the risks of lawsuits and/or the application of settlement.

== Roles ==
Consulting psychology encompasses diverse roles including individual assessment, individual and group process consultation, organizational development, education/training, employee selection/appraisal, research and evaluation test construction, executive/manager coaching, change management, expert technical support

== Professional education ==
The American Psychological Association publishes professional training guidelines for consulting psychologists. Master's programs are available under varying program names (e.g., business psychology). Some psychologists come to the field from areas such as clinical psychology, counseling psychology, or industrial and organizational psychology.

== Consultation in community psychology ==
It is often critical to build community relationships to understand the context and enable the collection of appropriate data to supporting the consulting relationship. Strong relationships can increase trust between consultants and clients, leading to more effective interventions. Urie Bronfenbrenner's model of ecological systems theory is a framework for navigating the challenges of consulting in community psychology.

=== Cultural sensitivity ===
Consulting psychology can involve providers in communities unlike their own. Success requires sensitivity to cultural variation, including recognition of the consultant's own cultural bias and/or ethnocentrism. This is further complicated by potential differences between the background of the consultee and client. In this context, "culture" involves client's/consultee's religious, cultural and family background and value system.

Cultural differences can involve communication styles, attitudes towards conflict, approaches to completing tasks, decision-making and attitudes towards disclosure.

== Notable consulting psychologists ==
Consulting psychologists who have helped to develop the field include Clayton Alderfer, Chris Argyris, Elliott Jaques, Harry Levinson, and Edgar Schein. More recent authors include Arthur Freedman, Dale Fuqua, Richard Kilburg, Rodney L. Lowman, Jody Newman, Ann O'Roark, David Peterson, Sharon Robinson-Kurpius, Peter Sorensen, and Len Sperry.

== Society of Consulting Psychology ==
The field's professional association is the Society of Consulting Psychology, Division 13 of the American Psychological Association (APA). The Society for Industrial and Organizational Psychology, Division 14 of the APA, is another professional association of which many consulting psychologists are members.

The American Board of Professional Psychology certifies participants.

== Ethical issues ==
Consultants face different ethical questions than clinicians:

- What degree of responsibility does the consultant take for a consultee's behavior and client outcomes?
- To what extent and over what period is the consultee dependent on the consultant?
- How is the consultant's responsibility for resolving conflicts with and among other participants?
- What are acceptable motivations for the consultant to offer consulting services?
- How are financial arrangements handled?
- What is the proper oversight for consulting relationships?
- What are the consultant's responsibilities for maintaining confidentiality?

Consulting relationships differ from traditional counseling and psychotherapeutic relationships in fundamental ways that require consideration in evaluating ethical questions. As of 2012, formal ethical guidelines specific to the discipline are not available. Existing codes of ethics for the helping professions provide limited guidance for consultation practice.

Ethical issues are inevitably complicated by the fact that consulting relationships involve three parties: the consultant, the consultee, and the consultee's client system.

Confidentiality depends on the consultant and on the cooperative efforts of perhaps many organizational members. Variable levels of participation means attention to providing only appropriate access to information. Managing information access and confidentiality require negotiation.

Clients' right to informed consent must be maintained in the presence of a consulting relationship. This right is complicated by the corresponding rights of consultees, including the right not to accept consultation.

Power is typically distributed unequally among participants in the consultation process. Power differentials may be real or perceived. Those with greater power must take responsibility for its use and impact.

Consultants with preexisting personal or professional relationships with participants in the consultation must take care that such relationships do not compromise the process.

== See also ==
- Coaching psychology
