= Childhood Autism Rating Scale =

Behavior rating scale intended to help diagnose autism

- Purpose: Diagnosing autism

The Childhood Autism Rating Scale (CARS) is a behavior rating scale intended to help diagnose autism. CARS was developed by Eric Schopler, Robert J. Reichler, and Barbara Rochen Renner. The scale was designed to help differentiate children with autism from those with other developmental delays, such as intellectual disability.

Although there is no gold standard among rating scales in detecting autism, CARS is frequently used as part of the diagnostic process.

== Evaluation criteria ==
The CARS is a diagnostic assessment method that rates individuals on a scale ranging from normal to severe, and yields a composite score ranging from non-autistic to mildly autistic, moderately autistic, or severely autistic. The scale is used to observe and subjectively rate fifteen items.

- relationship to people
- imitation
- emotional response
- body
- object use
- adaptation to change
- visual response
- listening response
- taste-smell-touch response and use
- fear and nervousness
- verbal communication
- non-verbal communication
- activity level
- level and consistency of intellectual response
- general impressions

== Indian Scale for Assessment of Autism ==
The Indian Scale for Assessment of Autism (ISAA) was developed by the Indian National Institute for the Mentally Handicapped in 2009. Analogous to, and congruent with, CARS, it is tailored to the Indian milieux, being available in several regional languages.

== See also ==
- Autism rights movement
- Global perceptions of autism
- Neurodiversity
