= Economic and Industrial Democracy =

- Discipline: Industrial and labor relations
- Language: English
- Edited by: Lars Magnusson and Jan Ottosson

Publication details
- History: 1980–present
- Publisher: SAGE Publications
- Frequency: Quarterly
- Impact factor: 1.913 (2021)

Standard abbreviations
- ISO 4: Econ. Ind. Democr.

Indexing
- ISSN: 0143-831X (print); 1461-7099 (web)
- LCCN: 81643705
- OCLC no.: 42896347

Links
- Journal homepage; Online access; Online archive

Economic and Industrial Democracy is a quarterly peer-reviewed academic journal that covers research on industrial relations and the organization of the workplace and economic life. The journal was established in 1980 and is published by SAGE Publications in association with the Department of Economic History of Uppsala University. The editors-in-chief are Lars Magnusson and Jan Ottosson (Uppsala University). Other editors have included Rudolf Meidner.

== Abstracting and indexing ==
The journal is abstracted and indexed in Scopus and the Social Sciences Citation Index. According to the Journal Citation Reports, its 2013 impact factor is 0.642, ranking it 16th out of 26 journals in the category "Industrial Relations & Labor".
