= Joseph Gone =

Joseph P. Gone
- Born: Helena, Montana
- Occupations: Clinical-community psychologist, social scientist
- Spouse: Tiya Miles

Academic background
- Education: A.B. in Psychology, Harvard College; PhD in Clinical-Community Psychology, University of Illinois Urbana-Champaign
- Thesis: Affect and its disorders in a Northern Plains Indian community: issues in cross-cultural discourse and diagnosis (2001)

Academic work
- Institutions: Harvard University; University of Michigan; University of Chicago
- Website: gonetowar.com

Joseph Patrick Gone (born 1967) is a clinical and community psychologist, and an interdisciplinary social scientist. He is Professor of Anthropology in the Faculty of Arts and Sciences and Professor of Global Health and Social Medicine in the Faculty of Medicine at Harvard University. He is also the Faculty Director of the Harvard University Native American Program.

As an interdisciplinary social scientist, Gone explores the intersection of culture, coloniality, mental health, and well-being among American Indians and other Indigenous Peoples. Undertaken in collaboration with Indigenous communities, his action-research projects have reconsidered community-based mental health services and harnessed traditional culture and spirituality as valuable resources in promoting the well-being of Indigenous populations. He has published more than 120 peer-reviewed articles in leading journals including the American Psychologist, Annual Review of Clinical Psychology, Journal of Consulting and Clinical Psychology, American Journal of Public Health and Transcultural Psychiatry.

Gone is a Fellow of the Association of Psychological Science and of seven divisions of the American Psychological Association. He has received more than 20 fellowships and early career awards in his fields, including a Guggenheim Fellowship. He received the 2021 Award for Distinguished Professional Contributions to Applied Research from the American Psychological Association and the 2023 Gold Medal Award for Impact in Psychology from the American Psychological Foundation. He is an elected member of the National Academy of Medicine.

== Early life and education ==
Upon graduating in 1985 from Flathead High School in Kalispell, MT, Gone attended one year at Oral Roberts University prior to enlisting in the U.S. Army. Following two years of military service, he matriculated as a cadet at the U.S. Military Academy at West Point, which he attended for two years. During his junior year, he transferred to Harvard College, where he earned his bachelor's degree in psychology in 1992. In 1993, he entered the doctoral program in clinical-community psychology at the University of Illinois at Urbana-Champaign, where he earned his Master's degree in 1996. He completed a pre-doctoral internship in Clinical Psychology in 2000 at McLean Hospital/Harvard Medical School, and received his Ph.D. in Clinical-Community Psychology from the University of Illinois Urbana-Champaign in 2001. His thesis was entitled, “Affect and its Disorders in a Northern Plains Indian Community: Issues in Cross-Cultural Discourse and Diagnosis”.

== Career ==
Gone began his academic career as Assistant Professor of Human Development at the University of Chicago in 2000. He soon commenced an appointment as Assistant Professor of Psychology and American Culture at the University of Michigan. He was promoted to Associate Professor of Psychology and American Culture in 2010, and then to Professor of Psychology in 2016 at the University of Michigan. Since 2018, he has served as Professor of Anthropology and of Global Health and Social Medicine at Harvard University.

Gone was Director of Native American Studies at the University of Michigan from 2017 to 2018, and Faculty Director of the Harvard University Native American Program at Harvard University since 2019.

== Research ==
Joseph P. Gone's research has significantly advanced the field of cultural-clinical psychology, particularly in understanding the mental health and well-being of Indigenous Peoples. His work spans several domains with an explicit focus on better understanding and serving American Indian communities.

=== Ethnopsychological Investigations ===
Gone's research in ethnopsychology explores how American Indian communities conceptualize aspects of mind, self, identity, emotion, personhood, and wellness. He focuses on Indigenous cultural psychology, investigating traditional explanatory models for psychological disorders. His research often draws on interviews from tribal leaders and prominent traditional American Indian practitioners.

=== Assessments of Cultural Commensurability ===
Gone critically examines the compatibility between Indigenous therapeutic traditions and Western mental health practices. He has conducted comparative analyses of Indigenous cultural psychologies and professional mental health perspectives, exploring the integration of "Aboriginal" and "Western" therapeutic approaches in community settings, such as a Manitoba Cree community's substance abuse treatment program. His research also examines tensions between indigenous communicative norms and conventional counseling practices.

=== Historical Trauma and Survivance ===
Much of Gone’s work has focused on exploring the concept of Historical Trauma. Gone has published several articles focusing on how Historical Trauma can be better applied to the experiences of American Indian communities, given that the concept was originally developed to explain the experiences of Jewish people who had lived through the Holocaust. He acknowledges the utility of the concept for explaining disparate health outcomes in American Indian communities. However, Gone also states that the concept can be limiting, as it may characterize American Indian selfhood as damaged or disordered. In response, Gone has worked to communicate alternative narratives, including the story of counting coup, a traditional practice found in many Plains American Indian tribes that emphasizes courage in battle.

=== Culture as Treatment ===
Gone has also published several articles on how traditional American Indian spiritual ceremonies can alleviate the suffering of American Indian Communities. In several of these articles, he cites an interview he conducted with a reservation traditionalist named Traveling Thunder. In this interview, Gone reports that Traveling Thunder said the struggles of the American Indian communities are not due to the Western conceptualization of mental health, but rather due to the loss of ceremonial knowledge and practice. Gone has worked to further explore the impact these ceremonial practices can have on American Indian communities, including sweat lodge ceremonies, talking circles, and other practices. Gone’s work continues to explore the idea of culture as treatment and further ensures that American Indian knowledge and ways of being are represented in psychology today.

=== Therapeutic Innovations ===
In the realm of therapeutic innovations, Gone has collaborated with indigenous communities to develop culturally grounded mental health interventions. He advocates for starting with Indigenous healing traditions and accommodating them within health care settings. Notable examples include Gone working with the Blackfeet Nation to develop a cultural immersion camp as a treatment for substance abuse and working with the American Indian health clinic in Detroit, USA to create an Urban American Indian Traditional Spirituality Program.

=== Related Research ===
In general terms, Gone's work encompasses the formulation of Indigenous psychology, addressing the effects of colonialism on Indigenous mental health. He has conducted systematic reviews on Indigenous historical trauma and its impact on health, critically examining the American Indian historical trauma concept. His work emphasizes the need for a culturally and contextually informed approach in the study of psychopathology.

In his re-imagining of mental health services, Gone highlights the cultural divergences between Western professional and Indigenous therapeutic traditions. He explores the integration of American Indian traditional healing with contemporary psychotherapy, advocating for the use of traditional cultural practices in mental health treatment. His research includes the investigation of Native American cultural practices in therapeutic settings and the challenges of providing mental health services to American Indian communities without perpetuating colonial power dynamics.

Gone's work is a testament to the importance of culturally responsive and decolonizing approaches in psychology, offering new pathways for treating mental health issues and advancing social justice in counseling psychology. His research not only elucidates the inequities in mental health status among Indigenous populations but also provides innovative solutions for culturally appropriate therapeutic remedies.

== Personal life ==
Gone is an enrolled member (tribal citizen) of the Aaniiih-Gros Ventre tribal nation of Montana. He is married to the historian Tiya Miles. They live together in Cambridge, MA, and in Bozeman, MT. They have three children.
