= Gail Goodman =

American psychologist

Gail S. Goodman
- Born: Los Angeles, California
- Occupation: Academic
- Years active: 1977-present
- Known for: Child eyewitness testimony

Academic background
- Education: PhD in psychology
- Alma mater: University of California, Los Angeles
- Thesis: (1977)

Academic work
- Discipline: Psychologist
- Sub-discipline: Legal

Gail S. Goodman is an American psychologist, known as one of the first in her field to study children's roles in the legal system, specifically children's eyewitness testimony pertaining to the Sixth Amendment. Her awards for her contributions to research, writing, and teaching include the American Psychological Association Award for Distinguished Contributions to Psychology in the Public Interest in 2017. Her involvement includes being cited in United States Supreme Court cases, which is rare for psychologists.

== Early life ==
Gail S. Goodman was born and raised in Los Angeles, California. She completed her studies at the University of California, Los Angeles (UCLA). She majored in psychology, with minors in sociology and anthropology, and graduated in 1971. After receiving her master's degree in 1972, she continued her education towards getting her PhD. She majored in developmental psychology, minoring in perception and physiological psychology. Goodman received her PhD in 1977. Her dissertation focused on the development of schema memory and was published in the reputable Cognitive Psychology journal. Goodman then began to develop her interest in children and the law as a postdoctoral fellow at the University of Denver; she began to enroll in classes concerning children's constitutional rights and the involvement of children in legal cases. Later Goodman conducted research at the Universite´ Rene´ Descartes in Paris for a year. When she returned from Paris she began to examine child eyewitness testimonies and the effects of these testimonies on jury members.

== Law-psychology career ==
=== Research ===
Early in her research career, Goodman experienced rejection by the psychological and law society who insisted that children testify too rarely for her research to be of interest. However, she began to gain recognition by the law-psychology community, beginning with her article in Psychology Today titled Would you believe a Child Witness? This article addressed the issues of child eyewitnesses and their accuracy. The article eventually even gained recognition by the American Bar Association.

Goodman's research was soon being recognized and commended by experts in the law-psychology community and journals became prepared to publish her articles concerning child eyewitnesses. Goodman's later articles clarified common concerns that juries found with child witnesses. It was not considered uncommon for jury members to doubt the accuracy of child witnesses because the jury often assumed children are susceptible to suggestibility, and it is difficult for them to distinguish reality from imagination. These articles showed that children are more capable than formerly believed to recall details of eyewitness events and their suggestibility rapidly lowers by the age of four. Children are also often as accurate as adults in their recall, although children recall less information than do adults, on average.

Prior to Goodman's work in the area of child eyewitnesses, there was little to no modern scientific study in the area. Her findings sparked interest in many other researchers who have joined in the interest of children's involvement in legal processes. Specific topics of Goodman's research include the suggestibility of children regarding false memories, the effect of childhood witnesses on jury members, and children's recall of traumatic events.

=== Contributions and awards ===
Goodman has contributed to and written many scholarly texts including articles, chapters, monographs, and books. She has appeared on local and national radio and television talk shows to discuss her research regarding children's testimonies and child abuse. Newspaper and magazine articles dealing with these topics have cited Goodman. Some of her research has been funded by prominent sources such as United States Department of Health and Human Services, National Institute of Justice, and the National Science Foundation.

Goodman has been honored with many awards for her contribution to research and writing including: American Psychological Association's 2005 Award for Distinguished Contributions to Research in Public Policy, American Psychological Association's 2005 APA Award for Distinguished Professional Contributions to Applied Research, among many others.

She has also received teaching awards including the Teaching and Mentoring Award from the American Psychology-Law Society. Recently Goodman has been recognized for her dedication to the field with prestigious awards including the Award for Lifetime Contribution to Developmental Psychology in the Service of Science and Society, 2008, and Association for Psychological Science's 2012 James McKeen Cattell Fellow Award for Lifetime Contributions to Applied Research.

=== Influence on laws ===
Goodman has conferred with many governments about their policies on child maltreatment, and legal and health practitioners have taken workshops put on by Goodman. She has been cited in State and Federal Supreme Court case decisions, and has helped with amicus briefs to the United States Supreme Court for the American Psychological Association and American Medical Association. Some of these decisions involved the Sixth Amendment of the constitution pertaining to the Confrontation Clause.

The particular amicus briefs in which Goodman contributed to were for the cases of Craig v. Maryland and Wright v. Idaho. In the case of Craig v. Maryland the court proposed three points. First, people accused of child sexual abuse suffer damage to their reputation requires protection of their constitutional rights from preliminary investigation throughout trial. One of these rights is to be able to have a face-of-face confrontation with the witnesses. Secondly, courts must interpret the Confrontation Clause to guarantee protection against a witness' testimony if it is false. They do this because of the high emotionality involved in child sexual abuse cases and the fact that witnesses who are children can be easily influenced in their testimonies. The Confrontational Clause is in regards to the Sixth Amendment which guarantees that you can confront your accusers face to face when you are charged with a crime. Lastly, a face-to-face confrontation at trial is a right and this right must not be terminated. The ruling of the court reversed the conviction of the defendant of sexual offenses, assault, and battery to children who were enrolled in her preschool, but determined that on a case-by-case basis child sexual assault victims could testify via CCTV if the judge determined the children could not reasonably communicate otherwise.

In regards to Wright v. Idaho, the court also ruled on the Confrontation Clause in four sections. First, statements that incriminated the witness under hearsay exceptions are not allowed under the Confrontation Clause unless the statement has sufficient proof of reliability. Secondly, the residual hearsay exception for Idaho is not a steadfast exception for the use of the Confrontation Clause. Next, it was the State Supreme Courts fault for placing such a great amount of influence on the lack of protection in the interview. Finally, the court found two factors pertaining to the child's testimony. Specifically is there was any motive to make up her story or if her testimony included statements in which the child would be able to make up, taking her young age into account. The defendant Wright in this case was charged with two counts of sexual conduct with two minors, which happened to be sisters.

== Academic career ==
Currently Goodman is a member of the faculty at University of California- Davis, and continues to study child memory and the law. She conducts studies in her Developmental Research Center Lab and also teaches courses. She has recently begun research in the area of the effects of child abuse and neglect on long-term memory.

She is a member of the Norwegian Academy of Science and Letters.
