= Pronoun reversal =

Referring to the self as 'he', 'she', 'they', 'you', or by name

Pronoun reversal, or pronominal reversal, is when individuals, typically children, refer to themselves as "he", "she", "they", or "you", or by their proper name. While it may signal autism spectrum disorder when it persists for an unusual length of time, some degree of pronoun confusion can occur as a part of normal speech development, and it is common in toddlers. Pronoun reversal is closely linked to echolalia: referring to themselves as they have heard others speak of them, resulting in the misapplication of pronouns.

For example:

Parent: What are you doing, Johnny?
Child: You're here.
Parent: Are you having a good time?
Child: You sure are.

As with many other autistic traits, if speech continues to develop more normally, this pronoun reversal might be expected to disappear. However, it can also be highly resistant to change. In some cases, targeted speech therapy or language intervention may help pronoun reversal, even after echolalia has diminished.
