= Experimental Aging Research =

- Discipline: Aging
- Language: English
- Edited by: Jeffrey W. Elias

Publication details
- History: 1975-present
- Publisher: Routledge
- Frequency: Quarterly
- Impact factor: 1.177 (2020)

Standard abbreviations
- ISO 4: Exp. Aging Res.

Indexing
- CODEN: EAGRDS
- ISSN: 0361-073X (print); 1096-4657 (web)
- LCCN: 76645781
- OCLC no.: 01950825

Links
- Journal homepage; Online access; Online archive

Experimental Aging Research is a peer-reviewed scientific journal covering research on life span and aging from a psychological and psychobiological perspective. It is published by Routledge. The editor-in-chief is Philip A. Allen.

== Abstracting and indexing ==
The journal is abstracted and indexed in Biological Abstracts, BIOSIS Previews, EBSCO Academic Search Premier, CINAHL/Cumulative Index to Nursing and Allied Health Literature, Current Contents/Life Sciences, Science Citation Index Expanded, MEDLINE/Index Medicus, PsycINFO, and Scopus. According to the Journal Citation Reports, the journal has a 2011 impact factor of 1.306.
