= Leopold Bellak =

American psychologist

Leopold Bellak (1916–2000) was a psychologist, psychoanalyst, and psychiatrist who pioneered the Children's Apperception Test (CAT) in collaboration with Sonya S. (Sorel) Bellak. He also collaborated on the Thematic Apperception Test (TAT), on clinical psychological assessments, and pioneered the understanding of ADHD (Attention Deficit Hyperactivity Disorder) as being a genetic disorder. Dr. Bellak created the 67-year-old publishing house, CPS Publishing LLC.

Bellak was born in Lima, Perú and as a refugee moved to the United States in 1939. In addition, he was the author of many books and manuscripts. His tests and books are used in universities, and by clinicians globally.

He received the APA Award for Distinguished Professional Contributions to Applied Research in 1979. He received the Bruno Klopfer Award in 1991. He was awarded these and many others for his many achievements.

His academic degrees had been earned at Boston University (MA), Harvard University (MA), and New York Medical College.
