= Rodney L. Lowman =

American psychologist, academic administrator, and entrepreneur

Rodney L. Lowman (born 1949) is an American psychologist, academic administrator and entrepreneur whose major contributions have been in the areas of career assessment and counseling, ethical issues in Industrial and Organizational Psychology (I-O Psychology), the integration of clinical psychology and I-O psychology and helping to develop the field of consulting psychology. In a study of the most prolific contributors to the Consulting Psychology Journal: Practice and Research, Lowman was rated the second highest contributor for articles for the period 1992–2007.

== Consulting psychology ==
Lowman helped obtain the APA's approval for a set of guidelines for the training of professional consulting psychologists at the doctoral and post-doctoral levels at the individual, group and organizational levels. He edited theHandbook of Organizational Consulting Psychology.
