= Leonard Eron =

American psychologist

Leonard David Eron (pronounced Ear- On) (April 22, 1920 – May 3, 2007) was an American psychologist who conducted one of the longest spanning longitudinal studies on aggressive behavior in children to date. Based on Leonard Eron and Rowell Huesmann's second longitudinal study that they conducted between 1977 and 1995, (the Cross-National Television Study) lead to the conclusion that media violence causes aggressive behavior. Eron was an author of many books, articles and a constant public policy advocate on Capitol Hill. He also twice received Fulbright scholarship and the APA's Award for Distinguished Lifetime Contributions to Media Psychology.

== Life ==
Len was born on April 22, 1920, in Newark, New Jersey, and grew up in Passaic, New Jersey. He was the son of Lithuanian immigrants.

After graduating from Passaic High School, where he focused his studies on theater, he began to study on a scholarship at the American Academy of Dramatic Arts.

However, once his father died he decide to earn his bachelor's degree at the city college of New York, which he earned in 1941

After one semester of graduate work at Columbia University, (where he met his future wife, Madeline Marcus) pearl harbor was bombed and he was drafted into the army and chose the "ordnance" corps.

He served in the campaigns of Sicily, and Italy, north Africa, and attained the rank of 1st lieutenant. During the campaigns he experienced many horrors on the beach at Anzio and other battles, to which undoubtedly contributed to his future interests in aggressive behavior.

After completing his doctorate from the university of Wisconsin, Eron attended the 1948 meeting of the American Psychological Association in Philadelphia. There he was introduced to Seymour Sarason from the faculty at Yale, and was later offered a position as an assistant professor of psychology at Yale.

Eron's mentor, Seymour Sarason would argue that to really contribute to child psychology, researchers needed to spend more time in the field rather than the lab and that's exactly what Eron did. He reduced time at Yale and accepted a position at the Rip Van Winkle Clinic in Columbia county, New York. There he conducted one of the longest longitudinal community epidemiological study on aggression in children (known as the Columbia County Longitudinal Study).

Eron's conclusion from his study was that media violence causes aggression and was published in the American Psychologist in 1972. This led to a storm of controversy and critiques and counter critiques were written in response, mass media opposed his conclusion.

Eron's conclusion were later supported by a second longitudinal study he and Rowell Huesmann conducted between 1977 and 1995, known as the Cross-National Television Study.

In 1962, Eron moved to the university of Iowa as a professor of psychology, and then in 1969 he moved to the university of Illinois at Chicago as professor, director of clinical services, and chair for several years.

He retired from Illinois in 1990, then spent the next 15 years at the university of Michigan dividing his time between the institute for social Research and the Department of Psychology.

During this time Eron began to output many scholarly articles and books. In fact he was the author of nine books and about 150 articles.

He served as editor of the journal of abnormal Psychology from 1973 to 1980, he served as an associate editor of the American Psychologist from 1986 to 1990, as the president of the Midwestern Psychological Association from 1985 to 1986, and was part of the international society for research on aggression from 1988 to 1990.

He died at his home in Lindenhurst, Illinois of congestive heart failure on May 3, 2007, at the age of 87.

Leonard Eron was the husband of Madeline Eron; father of Barb Eron, Don Eron, and Joni Eron Hobson; and grandfather of Samantha Eron and Jesse Eron.

== Career ==
He earned his bachelor's degree in 1941 from city College of New York

In 1946, Eron completed his master's degree in psychology

He earned his doctorate in clinical psychology at University of Wisconsin - Madison in 1949 under the mentorship of Ann Magaret.

In 1950 he published "A Normative study of the TAT" in the publication Psychological Monographs.

Later, in 1965, along with his colleagues at yale Eron published the seminal book on projective testing, "An experimental approach to Projective Techniques."

He taught at University of Iowa from 1962 to 1969, and later at the University of Illinois at Chicago. In 1990, he took a position at University of Michigan.

Co-authored with Monroe M. Lefkowitz and Leopold O. Walder, the Columbia County Longitudinal Study followed participants from 1960 to 2000. The researchers interviewed the parents and peers and analyzed television viewing. They found a correlation between exposure to violence via parents or television and violent behavior.

Eron was co-editor of the 1986 report, "Television and the Aggressive Child: A Cross-National Comparison." He also testified before the United States Congress on youth violence in 1992.

Eron was a Fulbright scholar twice. He was a diplomate of the American Board of Professional Psychology and a fellow of the Academy of Clinical Psychology. the American Psychological Foundation and the American Association for the advancement of Science.

In 1980 he was given the APA Award for distinguished Professional contributions to knowledge

In 1995, he received the APF's Gold Medal Award for Life Contribution by a Psychologist in the Public Interest

In 2003, he received APA's Award for Distinguished Lifetime Contributions to Media Psychology.
