= Autism Diagnostic Observation Schedule =

Standardized diagnostic test for autism

- Purpose: assess autism in children, adolescents, and adults

The Autism Diagnostic Observation Schedule (ADOS) is a standardized diagnostic test for assessing autism spectrum disorder (ASD). The protocol consists of a series of structured and semi-structured tasks that involve social interaction between the examiner and the person under assessment. The examiner observes and identifies aspects of the subject's behavior, assigns these to predetermined categories, and combines these categorized observations to produce quantitative scores for analysis. Research-determined cut-offs identify the potential diagnosis of autism spectrum disorder, allowing a standardized assessment of autistic symptoms.

The Autism Diagnostic Interview-Revised (ADI-R), a companion instrument, is a structured interview conducted with the parents of the referred individual to cover the subject's full developmental history. The ADI-R has lower sensitivity but similar specificity to the ADOS. Neither ADI-R nor ADOS should be considered gold standard diagnostic tests for autism. Neither of these tests are required by the DSM-5 for an autism diagnosis.

== Development and history ==
=== ADOS ===
The ADOS was originally developed by Catherine Lord, Michael Rutter, Pamela C. DiLavore, and Susan Risi in 1989 to provide a standardized tool for diagnosing ASD. It was designed to address the limitations of existing diagnostic tools, which often lacked standardized criteria, varied in validity, and were less effective at identifying individuals with lower support needs. Many of these tools also demonstrated issues with poor reliability and inconsistent diagnostic criteria, highlighting the need for a more reliable and standardized approach.

The protocol consisted of 8 tasks meant to assess the individual's social and communicative behaviors. Behaviors were rated on the following scale:

- (0) within normal limits
- (1) infrequent or possible abnormality
- (2) definite abnormality

Some ratings could also be assigned a rating of 7, indicating observed behaviors not otherwise specified.

=== PL-ADOS ===
In response to the need for diagnostic tools for autism in younger children, researchers developed the Pre-Linguistic Autism Diagnostic Observation Schedule (PL-ADOS). The PL-ADOS adapted the ADOS format to be less reliant on verbal communication, making it better suited for assessing children with limited language abilities. It consisted of 12 tasks, retaining only the free/unstructured playtime from the original ADOS and adding new activities designed to be less dependent on speech.

=== ADOS-G ===
In 2000, Lord and her colleagues introduced the ADOS-Generic (ADOS-G), which was designed to assess a broader developmental range of individuals. The ADOS-G introduced a modular format, allowing for the use of different protocols depending on the individual's developmental level and language abilities:

- Module 1: For children who do not consistently use phrase speech
- Module 2: For children that are not verbally fluent but use some flexible phrase speech
- Module 3: For verbally fluent children
- Module 4: For adults, and adolescents who may not be interested in playing with toys

While the PL-ADOS effectively discriminated between children aged 2 to 5 years with autism and those with other developmental delays, it was less accurate for children who demonstrated some expressive language. The ADOS-G was developed in response to these issues, as well as to include additional tasks for adolescents and adults.

The ADOS became commercially available in 2001 through Western Psychological Services. The ADOS-G demonstrated strong reliability and validity. However, it was less effective at distinguishing between autism and Pervasive developmental disorder not otherwise specified (PDD-NOS).

=== ADOS-2 ===
The second edition of the ADOS, published in 2012, included updated norms, improved algorithms for Modules 1 to 3, and a new Toddler Module (T) for assessing children aged 12 to 30 months. The scoring algorithm was also revised to align with the recent changes in the DSM-5 diagnostic criteria. While the ADOS-G had separate sections for social and communication behaviors, the ADOS-2 combined these into a single domain called social affect, and added a new domain to assess restrictive and repetitive behaviors (RRB).

== Method ==
The ADOS consists of a series of structured and semi-structured tasks that generally takes 30-60 minutes to administer. During this time, the examiner provides a series of opportunities for the subject to show social and communication behaviors relevant to the diagnosis of autism. Each subject is administered activities from the module that corresponds to their developmental and language level. The ADOS should not be used for formal diagnosis with individuals who are blind, deaf, or otherwise seriously impaired by sensory or motor disorders, such as cerebral palsy or muscular dystrophy.

Following task administration and observation coding, a scoring algorithm classifies the individual with autism, autism spectrum disorder, or non-spectrum. The toddler module algorithm yields a "range of concern" rather than a definite classification.

== Modules ==
=== Toddler module ===
The toddler module is appropriate for children 12–30 months who use little to no phrase speech and are able to walk independently. This module consists of eleven primary activities:

1. Free play
2. Blocking toy play
3. Response to name
4. Bubble play
5. Anticipation of a routine with objects
6. Response to joint attention
7. Responsive social smile
8. Anticipation of social routine
9. Functional and symbolic imitation
10. Bath time
11. Snack

=== Module 1 ===
Module 1 is appropriate for children 31 months and older who use little or no phrase speech. This module consists of ten activities:

1. Free play
2. Response to name
3. Response to joint attention
4. Bubble play
5. Anticipation of a routine with objects
6. Responsive social smile
7. Anticipation of a social routine
8. Functional and symbolic imitation
9. Birthday party
10. Snack

=== Module 2 ===
Module 2 is appropriate for children six years old or younger who speak in phrases but have not yet developed fluent verbal language. This module consists of fourteen activities:

1. Construction task
2. Response to name
3. Make-believe play
4. Joint interactive play
5. Conversation
6. Response to joint attention
7. Demonstration task
8. Description of a picture
9. Telling a story from a book
10. Free play
11. Birthday party
12. Snack
13. Anticipation of a routine with objects
14. Bubble play

=== Module 3 ===
Module 3 is appropriate for children or young adolescents who are verbally fluent. This module consists of fourteen activities:

1. Construction task
2. Make-believe play
3. Joint interactive play
4. Demonstration task
5. Description of a picture
6. Telling a story from a book
7. Cartoons
8. Conversation and reporting
9. Emotions
10. Social difficulties and annoyance
11. Break
12. Friends, relationships, and marriage
13. Loneliness
14. Creating a story

=== Module 4 ===
Module 4 is appropriate for older adolescents and adults. While similar to module 3, module 4 relies more heavily on questions and verbal responses rather than non-verbal actions observed during play. This module consists of ten to fifteen activities. Activities marked by an asterisk are optional:

1. Construction task*
2. Telling a story from a book
3. Description of picture*
4. Conversation and reporting
5. Current work or school*
6. Social difficulties and annoyance
7. Emotions
8. Demonstration task
9. Cartoons*
10. Break
11. Daily living*
12. Friends, relationships, and marriage
13. Loneliness
14. Plans and hopes
15. Creating a story

== Diagnostic accuracy ==
The social communication difficulties that the ADOS and ADOS-2 seek to measure are not unique to ASD; there is a heightened risk of false positives in individuals with other psychological disorders. In particular, an increased false positive rate has been observed in adults with psychosis; while case reports indicate that such false positives may also occur in cases of childhood-onset schizophrenia, which is an exceptionally rare entity with a frequency of 1 in 40000. There is evidence that adults with schizophrenia demonstrate an increased incidence of autistic features compared to the general population, resulting in higher ADOS scores, though schizophrenia patients also experience positive symptoms of psychosis (e.g. hallucinations, delusions, formal thought disorders).

A 2016 study found that 21% of children with a diagnosis of ADHD (and without a concurrent diagnosis of ASD) scored in the autism spectrum range on the ADOS total score.

The combined data indicate that the lifetime prevalence of ADHD among individuals with ASD is approximately 40%.

False positives have also been found in school-age subjects who have high anxiety or trauma-related disorders; in these cases, the ADOS-2 scores related to repetitive and restrictive behaviors (RRB) are usually lower than typical for ASD.

A 2018 Cochrane systematic review included 12 studies of ADOS diagnostic accuracy in pre-school children (Modules 1 and 2). The summary sensitivity was 0.94 (95% CI 0.89 to 0.97), with sensitivity in individual studies ranging from 0.76 to 0.98. The summary specificity was 0.80 (95% CI 0.68 to 0.88), with specificity in individual studies ranging from 0.20 to 1.00. The studies were evaluated for bias using the QUADAS-2 framework; of the 12 included studies, 8 were evaluated as having a high risk of bias, while for the remaining four there was insufficient information available for the risk of bias to be properly evaluated. The authors could not identify any studies for the ADOS-2; the scope of the review was limited to preschool age children (mean age under 6 years), which excluded studies of Modules 3 and 4 from the meta-analysis. One included study examined the additive sensitivity and specificity of the ADOS used in combination with the ADI-R; that study found an 11% improvement in specificity (compared to ADOS alone) at the cost of a 14% reduction in sensitivity; however, due to overlapping confidence intervals, that result could not be considered statistically significant.
