= Consulting Psychology Journal: Practice and Research =

Consulting Psychology Journal
- Discipline: Consulting psychology
- Language: English
- Edited by: Theodore L. Hayes

Publication details
- Former names: Consulting Psychology Journal: Practice and Research
- History: 1937-present
- Publisher: American Psychological Association
- Frequency: Quarterly

Standard abbreviations
- ISO 4: Consult. Psychol. J

Indexing
- ISSN: 1065-9293 (print); 1939-0149 (web)

Links
- Journal homepage; Online access

Consulting Psychology Journal is the flagship journal of the Society of Consulting Psychology, a division of the American Psychological Association. It is a peer-reviewed, scholarly journal that publishes quantitative and qualitative research, case studies, conceptual articles, and wisdom papers that advance the practice of providing psychologically based services to improve organizations and the people who work in them.

The journal is applied in nature and publishes papers that meet scientific standards, but are also readable, practical, and actionable. The current editor is Theodore L. Hays.

== Special issues ==
The journal has published a number of special issues on important consulting psychology topics, such as Ethical and Legal Issues in Artificial Intelligence for Organizational Consultants and Managers, More About Executive Coaching: Practice and Research, Emerging Issues in Leadership Development Consultation, Workplace bullying/Mobbing, Culture, Race and Ethnicity in Organizational Consulting Psychology, and Organizational Consulting in National Security Contexts.

== Abstracting and indexing ==
The journal is indexed by PsycINFO/PsychAbstracts and Scopus and is electronically accessible through PsycARTICLES.
