= List of biobanks =

A biobank is a physical place which stores biological specimens. In some cases, participant data is also collected and stored. Access policies details may vary across biobanks but generally involve obtaining ethics approval from institutional review boards (IRB) and scientific review or peer review approval from the institutions under which the biobanks operate as well as Ethics approval from the institutions where the research projects will be undertaken. The samples and data are safeguarded so that researchers can use them in experiments deemed adequate. This article contains a list of biobanks.

== Classification ==
Biobanks can be classified in several ways. Some examples of how they can be classified is by their controlling entity (government, commercial enterprise, or private research institution), by their geographical location, or by what sorts of samples they collect.

Biobanks may be classified by purpose or design. Disease-oriented biobanks usually have a hospital affiliation through which they collect samples representing a variety of diseases, perhaps to look for biomarkers affiliated with disease. Population-based biobanks need no particular hospital affiliation because they sample from large numbers of all kinds of people, perhaps to look for biomarkers for disease susceptibility in a general population.

List of biobanks
Biobank	Affiliation	Focus	Type	Location	Founding	Notes
All of Us		Population	non-profit	United States		
Acutelines	University of Groningen & University Medical Centre Groningen	Acute illness	non-profit	Netherlands	2020	
Autism Genetic Resource Exchange	Autism Speaks	Autism	non-profit	North America and Asia		
Avon Longitudinal Study of Parents and Children	University of Bristol		non-profit	United Kingdom	1990	
BioBank Graz	Medical University of Graz		non-profit	Austria		
Vilnius Santaros Klinikos Biobank	Vilnius University Hospital Santaros Klinikos		non-profit	Lithuania		
BioBank Japan	RIKEN, University of Tokyo	Population, personalized medicine	non-profit	Japan	2003	
Canadian Biosample Repository	University of Alberta		non-profit	Canada		
CARTaGENE biobank	Centre hospitalier universitaire Sainte-Justine		non-profit	Quebec	2009	
Cooperative Human Tissue Network		Cancer	government	USA	1987	
Coriell Institute for Medical Research		Genetic Disorders, rare diseases, Stem Cells	non-profit	United States	1953	
DeCODE genetics			commercial	Iceland		
Estonian Genome Project	University of Tartu		non-profit	Estonia	2000	
EuroBioBank		Rare diseases	non-profit	Europe		
FINBB		Population	non-profit	Finland		
FinnGen		Population, disease focused	public-private	Finland	2017	
Generation Scotland	NHS Scotland		government	Scotland	1999	
Genomics England		Rare diseases, cancer	public-private	England	2013	
HUNT Biobank	Norwegian University of Science and Technology		non-profit	Norway	2002	
Integrated Biobank of Luxembourg	Luxembourg Institute of Health	Cancer, immunology		Luxembourg		
Interdisziplinäre Biomaterial- und Datenbank Würzburg	University of Würzburg & Universitätsklinikum Würzburg		public agency	Würzburg, Germany	2013	
Kaiser Permanente Research Bank	Kaiser Permanente	Population		United States	2016	
Lifelines	University of Groningen & University Medical Centre Groningen	Healthy aging	non-profit	Groningen, The Netherlands	2006	
Million Veterans Project	United States Department of Veterans Affairs	American veterans	non-profit	United States		
MyCode	Geisinger Health System	Electronic health records, personalized medicine	commercial	Pennsylvania, United States	2007	
nPOD	University of Florida, JDRF	Diabetes	non-profit	United States	2007	
Open Biobank	The Neuro	Neurology	non-profit	Canada	2015	
PATH Biobank		Breast cancer	non-profit	Germany	2002	
Penn Medicine BioBank	University of Pennsylvania	Medical-academic	non-profit	Pennsylvania, United States	2008	
Plasma Services Group		Autoimmune, Infectious, Coagulation, Diagnostics	commercial	United States	2017	
Sapien Biosciences	Apollo Hospitals & Saarum Innovations	Population, with special focus on tailoring treatment for Cancer	private	India (headquartered in Hyderabad)	2012	
Signature biobank	Research centre of the Montreal Mental Health Institute	Mental health	non-profit	Canada (Quebec)	2012	
The Malaysian Cohort	National University of Malaysia		non-profit	Malaysia	2003	
Tohoku Medical Megabank Project	Tohoku University, Iwate Medical University	Population, Birth and Three-Generation	non-profit	Japan	2012	
UK Biobank			non-profit	United Kingdom	2006	
Biobank Sweden	Health and Social Care Inspectorate	Collaborative biobank infrastructure (nearly 250 biobanks)	government	Sweden	2017	
