= The Telepathy Tapes =

2024 podcast

- Genre: documentary podcast, society and culture podcast
- Format: Audio

Creative team
- Created by: Ky Dickens
- Written by: Ky Dickens

Cast and voices
- Starring: Ky Dickens

Music
- Composed by: Elizabeth P.W.

Publication
- No. of seasons: 2
- No. of episodes: 10
- Original release: September 9 – December 23, 2024
- Provider: Acast

Related
- Website: thetelepathytapes.com

The Telepathy Tapes is a podcast by documentary director Ky Dickens. The podcast presents nonspeaking autistic children that are claimed to demonstrate telepathic communication and other paranormal abilities. Season 1 was released in 2024.

The show has been criticized for omitting well-established scientific findings that contradict its central premise. The show promotes a discredited therapeutic technique called "facilitated communication" which proponents claim uncovers the communication abilities of non-verbal autistic individuals while the published evidence shows facilitators, rather than the autistic individuals, are the true authors of the messages produced.

== Description ==
Based on certain unreviewed speculations of former psychiatrist Diane Hennacy Powell, the podcast entertains the notion that nonspeaking autistic children communicate telepathically with people around them relying on personal testimony, anecdotes, and interviews with proponents of paranormal powers. The Telepathy Tapes was directed by American documentary maker Ky Dickens. Dickens's degrees are in communications, fine arts and sociology while she describes herself as a "science nerd". She became interested in this subject when she heard Powell speaking on another podcast. Powell is heavily featured and the podcast's website contends that she has been researching the topic for a decade. The audience is invited to subscribe to the paywalled portion of the website to see the videos of the children trying to read minds and fund her research activities.

Interviews with parents of autistic children constitute the core of most episodes, with people presented as experts and Dickens chiming in to speculate about paranormal powers. Listeners can hear sessions during which autistic children try to guess numbers and words their parent is thinking about, successes in these tests being presented as evidence of telepathy. The podcast also features Dickens' camera technician in the role of a hardened materialist skeptic who turns into a believer in the course of the series.

The podcast quickly gathered a very large audience during the Fall of 2024, briefly becoming the most popular podcast on some streaming services in the United States and the United Kingdom. As of January 2025, The Telepathy Tapes had a 4.9 stars rating on Spotify with over 2,000 reviews. Dickens has announced the second season of the podcast would feature non-autistic telepaths and is raising funding for a television production.

== Reception and criticism ==
While the show received an enthusiastic reception from a large number of listeners and has been promoted by Joe Rogan, it has been heavily criticized for its pseudoscientific premise and speculations. The Times' podcast reviewer, James Marriott, found listening to the anguish of the parents featured on the podcast "heartbreaking", but takes Dickens to task for presenting a mockery of the scientific approach. While acknowledging that what she presents does not constitute scientific evidence, Dickens also chides "close-minded" scientists for not thinking outside the box, echoing similar complaints made by Powell in the podcast. Powell's license was briefly suspended by the Oregon Medical Board in 2010-2011, which she said was due to the medical board's opposition to her support for certain parapsychology claims. Powell expressed some frustration with her portrayal on the podcast and told The Cut that Dickens misrepresented the results of some of the experiments she discussed. In particular, a brain scan which Dickens described on the podcast as verifying telepathic ability was characterized by Powell as a failure. Another participant in the podcast, psychologist Jeff Tarrant, defended his involvement with the show in spite of criticism, clarifying that even as "these demonstrations convinced me of the reality of these abilities, they were not structured as formal experimental trials." The podcast Science Vs noted that the claim in The Telepathy Tapes of a "huge amount of research on telepathy published in peer-reviewed journals, which has proved to be repeatable and seems to me irrefutable" was based on a meta analysis that, among other issues, relied on studies with poor data controls such as rejecting a subject who 'wasn't really concentrating during the experiment' and that research conducted by believers tend to measure an effect while those performed by non believers do not.

After seeing the short video clips from the website, Jonathan Jarry of the McGill University Office for Science and Society and psychologist Stuart Vyse both independently concluded the tests are derived from the rapid prompting method, a variation of the scientifically discredited technique of facilitated communication. For Vyse and Jarry, with the parent holding the board that the child needs to point to construct a response, or holding the child themselves, the most likely explanation is that the parent is steering the child to the right answer, consciously or not (through the ideomotor effect). Vyse further pointed out that the podcast does not acknowledge any of the research that conclusively showed that facilitators, not the autistic individuals, were the true authors of the messages produced through facilitated communication. About facilitated communication techniques, the American Academy of Child and Adolescent Psychiatry states that "studies have repeatedly demonstrated that FC is not a scientifically valid technique for individuals with autism"; the American Psychological Association and the American Academy of Pediatrics also published position statements against their use. The Association for Science in Autism Treatment issued a statement supporting Vyse's conclusions: "the Telepathy Tapes podcast spreads misinformation about the authenticity of facilitated communication and the presence of paranormal abilities in nonspeaking autistic individuals."

Beyond telepathy, Dickens also briefly entertains the notions that autistic children can also communicate with ghosts and that strange powers can be accessed through crystals. Journalist Zaid Jilani noted that the podcast "relies on experts and witnesses who sincerely believe that vaccination is helping increase the prevalence of autism, something that has no scientific basis." Skeptical critic Michael Marshall additionally notes that Powell favorably cites an anti-vax proponent as "her go-to expert on autistic children", and Powell also objected to vaccinating children in a speech she made at a March 2017 rally alongside Judy Mikovits, Del Bigtree, and Robert F. Kennedy Jr. Social psychologist Devon Price recommended that those interested in exploring what he described as "the many, many problems with The Telepathy Tapes" listen to the episode of the podcast Conspirituality devoted to the same. Price opines, "The Telepathy Tapes is very much a part of a pipeline that leads from talking of 'highly sensitive persons' and indigo children all the way down to antivax sentiment."

The podcast has been accused of copystriking YouTube videos critical of the series, including a February 2025 video posted on a YouTube channel ran by Janyce Boynton, a former facilitated communicator who is now critical of the practice, and a March 2026 video by the YouTuber Professor Dave Explains, also critical of the podcast and facilitated communication. Both copystrikes were later overturned on appeal.

The podcast was nominated as Podcast of the year at the 2025 iHeartRadio Podcast Awards. It was also awarded as best indie podcast at the 2025 webby awards.

== Episodes ==
No.	Title	Length (minutes:seconds)	Original release date
1	"Unveiling the Hidden World of Telepathic Communication in a Silenced Community"	47:00	September 9, 2024
2	"Telepathy or the merging of consciousness?"	46:00	September 16, 2024
3	"Telepathic Communication between friends and groups"	43:00	September 23, 2024
4	"Teen Love with a Twist of Telepathy"	44:00	September 30, 2024
5	"Teachers Break the Silence about Telepathy"	41:00	October 7, 2024
6	"Scientific Evidence for ESP that Shatters the Materialist Paradigm"	40:00	October 14, 2024
7	"Telepathy is the Tip of the Iceberg"	55:00	October 28, 2024
8	"Gatekeepers of Truth - Telepathy and the Spelling Controversy"	51:00	November 11, 2024
9	"Telepathy Across Dimensions, Death, and Beyond"	60:00	November 25, 2024
10	"In Their Words: Messages from the Non-Speakers"	38:00	December 23, 2024
