= Ido Kedar =

Non-speaking autistic person and attributed author

Ido Kedar is a non-speaking autistic person, identified by various sources as an autism advocate, to whom two books have been attributed: the essay collection Ido in Autismland (2012) and the novel In Two Worlds (2018).

Communications with Kedar have their origins in various techniques of facilitated communication (FC) and the rapid prompting method (RPM). He initially used letter boards with facilitator involvement, and in later interactions has been reported to type on an iPad without physical contact from a facilitator. The authenticity of writings attributed to Kedar, as with all communications that ultimately derive from FC, is disputed. Mainstream scientific and professional organizations consider FC and RPM pseudoscience because evidence from controlled trials show that it is typically the facilitator rather than the disabled person who is the source of the communication. Some advocates for FC have maintained that because Kedar does not have physical support when the text is produced, there ought to be a re-evaluation by the professional community as to whether such claims of communication are valid, but, in response, a professor in linguistics and expert in the subject of augmentative and alternative communication pointed out that facilitator influence need not involve physical contact.

== Early life ==
Kedar was diagnosed autistic at age two. He was enrolled in applied behavior analysis (ABA), where he was rewarded with food for performing daily drills.

Soma Mukhopadhyay, the inventor of the rapid prompting method, was involved with subsequent facilitated communication interventions which were claimed to have unlocked Kedar's ability to communicate. In later interviews and interactions, Kedar has been reported to type on an iPad without physical contact from a facilitator. For example, the Canadian Broadcasting Corporation reported about an interview Kedar did with them in such a fashion. In the transcript of that interview, Kedar is reported to have communicated that until the age of seven, despite understanding language and being able to read, he did not believe his intelligence would be discovered.

Kedar was reported to have enrolled in advanced courses in high school and to have been placed on a college track. He reportedly received high scores on the California High School Exit Exam.

== Works attributed to Kedar ==
=== Ido in Autismland ===
Essays and memoirs attributed to Kedar were produced in his early teens. A self-published collection of essays, Ido in Autismland, was written prior to age sixteen.

In a "Voices: Reflective Accounts of Education" essay for the Harvard Educational Review, Carrie C. Snow discusses text attributed to Kedar in Ido in Autismland describing "how swimming aids his sense of body awareness." She writes: "Similarly, playing the piano was a saving grace for him as a student but also, more importantly, as a person. It gave him the tactile, routine, rhythmic, kinesthetic, intellectual, and creative sense of stimulus and discipline he needed to ground himself in a world that was overwhelmingly negatively receptive of how he showed up."

In the Journal of Literary & Cultural Disability Studies, Joseph Valente analyzes Ido in Autismland, which he describes as an "auti-biography," to explore "the literary expectation [...] that the autistic protagonist will conquer the adversity posed by the condition to the degree that it will feel as if something along the lines of a 'miracle recovery' has been achieved."

In Education Digest, Sean McCollum notes that in Ido in Autismland, text attributed to Kedar "expresses his contempt for ABA" and describes "a self-described neurological disconnect between mind and body." In a Studies in Social Justice article by Becky Gold, Kedar was one of several advocates and bloggers noted for their "insightful critiques" of ABA.

=== Wall Street Journal op-ed ===
In 2018, an op-ed attributed to Kedar was published in the Wall Street Journal, entitled "I Was Born Unable to Speak, and a Disputed Treatment Saved Me". This received a response in the Wall Street Journal by Elise Davis-McFarland, the president of the American Speech–Language–Hearing Association (ASHA), who wrote that other organizations, in addition to ASHA, did not recommend RPM due to a "lack of high-quality scientific proof of RPM's efficacy."

=== In Two Worlds ===
In 2018, In Two Worlds was self-published under Kedar's name. It was described by the Irish Independent as "the first novel ever published by a severely autistic non-speaking person" and as "one of the few novels by an author with nonverbal autism" by a Kirkus Reviews Indie Review.

=== Appearances ===
Kedar has made appearances at conferences and guest lectures.

== Authorship dispute ==
The authenticity of Kedar's authorship has been debated, reflecting the broader scientific consensus that facilitated communication (FC) and the rapid prompting method (RPM) are not reliable methods of communication. Major scientific and professional organizations, including the American Speech–Language–Hearing Association, have concluded that these methods lack high-quality scientific evidence of efficacy, and that in FC, it is typically the facilitator, not the disabled person, who is the source of the communication. Adjunct professor of linguistics at the University of Pennsylvania and expert in Augmentative and Alternative Communication, Katharine Beals, has pointed out that nonverbal autistic individuals such as Kedar who require a nearby facilitator to communicate, even without physical contact, may be responding to auditory and visual cues, a known psychological phenomenon, so that the facilitator may be authoring some or all of the communication.

In writings attributed to Kedar, there is criticism of the dismissal of autistic voices who use facilitated communication. Kedar's writings were cited as supporting examples by advocates for facilitated communication Melanie Heyworth, Timothy Chan (himself a facilitated communicator), and Wenn Lawson in Frontiers in Psychology: "At the very least, as researchers, we have a duty of care to acknowledge and listen to the voices of FC/RPM users who have become independent of physical support and who have irrefutably demonstrated cognitive and communicative competence." In response to this article, Beals pointed out that "facilitator influence need not involve physical contact: auditory and visual cues... can also influence messages."

== Publications ==
=== Books ===
- Ido in Autismland: Climbing Out of Autism's Silent Prison (2012) ISBN 978-0988324701
- In Two Worlds (2018) ISBN 978-1732291508

=== Opinion ===
- "I Was Born Unable to Speak, and a Disputed Treatment Saved Me". WSJ. Dow Jones & Company, Inc. September 23, 2018.
- "Not Talking Is Not the Same as Not Thinking." In Vallejo Peña, Edlyn (Ed.). (2019). Communication alternatives in autism: Perspectives on typing and spelling approaches for the nonspeaking. McFarland. (pp. 69-82) ISBN 978-1476678917

== Recognition ==
- Quarter Finalist for the 2018 Publishers Weekly BookLife prize.
- Recipient of the 2017 Diller teen Tikkun Olam award in recognition of Ido in Autismland.
