= Idou =

Idou may refer to the following:

- Sony Ericsson Satio
- Ido (name)#Surname another transliteration of the Japanese surname Idō
