= Ido (disambiguation) =

Ido is a constructed language.

Ido or IDO may refer to:

== Places ==
- Ido, Nigeria
- Ido-Osi, in Ekiti State, Nigeria
  - Ido Ekiti
- Ido Station, a railway station in Kagawa, Japan

== Organizations ==
- International Dance Organization
- İDO, a ferry boat company in Istanbul, Turkey
- IDO Corporation, a Japanese telecommunications company, now part of KDDI

== Other uses ==
- Ido (name), a given name and a surname, including a list of people with the name
- Indoleamine 2,3-dioxygenase, an enzyme
- Idu script, an archaic Korean script also called "Ido"
- Ido (film), a 2005 film by Kei Fujiwara

== See also ==
- Iddo (disambiguation)
- ID-0, a Japanese anime series
