= Ido (name) =

Ido is both a given name and a surname of Hebrew origin. Notable people with the name include:

== Given name ==
- Ido Abram (1940–2019), Dutch educationist
- Ido Bachelet, Israeli musician and scientist
- Ido Drent (born 1987), New Zealand actor
- Ido Exbard (born 1988), Israeli footballer
- Ido Kedar, autistic activist
- Ido Kozikaro (born 1978), Israeli basketball player
- Ido Levy (footballer) (born 1990), Israeli footballer
- Ido Mosseri (born 1978), Israeli actor
- Ido Nehoshtan (born 1957), Israeli military commander
- Ido Pariente (born 1978), Israeli martial artist
- Ido Tako (born 2001), Israeli actor
- Ido Zelkovitz (born 1979), Israeli historian

== Surname ==
- Chihiro Idō (井道 千尋; born 1988), Japanese shogi player
- Jacky Ido (born 1977), Burkinabe-born French film actor
- Reizan Idō (1859–1935), Japanese writer
- Toshizō Ido (born 1945), governor of Hyōgo Prefecture in Japan
- Victor Ido (1869–1948), main alias of Indo (Eurasian) Dutch language writer and journalist Hans van de Wall

== See also ==
- Iddo
