= Laziness Does Not Exist =

2021 nonfiction book by Devon Price

- Author: Devon Price
- Audio read by: Em Grosland
- Genre: Nonfiction
- Publisher: Atria Books
- Publication date: 2021
- ISBN: 978-1982140106

Laziness Does Not Exist is a 2021 nonfiction book by Devon Price.

== Subject matter ==
In the book, Price attempts to "dispel as a societal myth" the "link between self-worth and productivity". Price analyzes television and film to demonstrate the history of the belief and interviews experts and acquaintances to explain the harm of overcoming laziness. Price also explains this thesis through the experience of being LGBT, referencing the career of Andrew Tobias.

Price claims that burnout is a more likely explanation for lack of productivity.

The book does not make claims that hard work is a bad thing.

== Reception ==
The Financial Times says the book "is definitely worth a read" for those looking to understand why they aspire to a goal of productivity.

John Warner of the Chicago Tribune writes, "the exploration in the book is nuanced and thorough", also noting that objections to the premise are confronted clearly and gently.

Writing for Chicago Review of Books, Bessie Taliaferro says the book "upends the self-help books on our nightstands as well as in our minds". She highlights the book's offering of "escape from the “fitter, happier, more productive” mentality".
