= Tohoku Medical Megabank Project =

Japanese medical research project

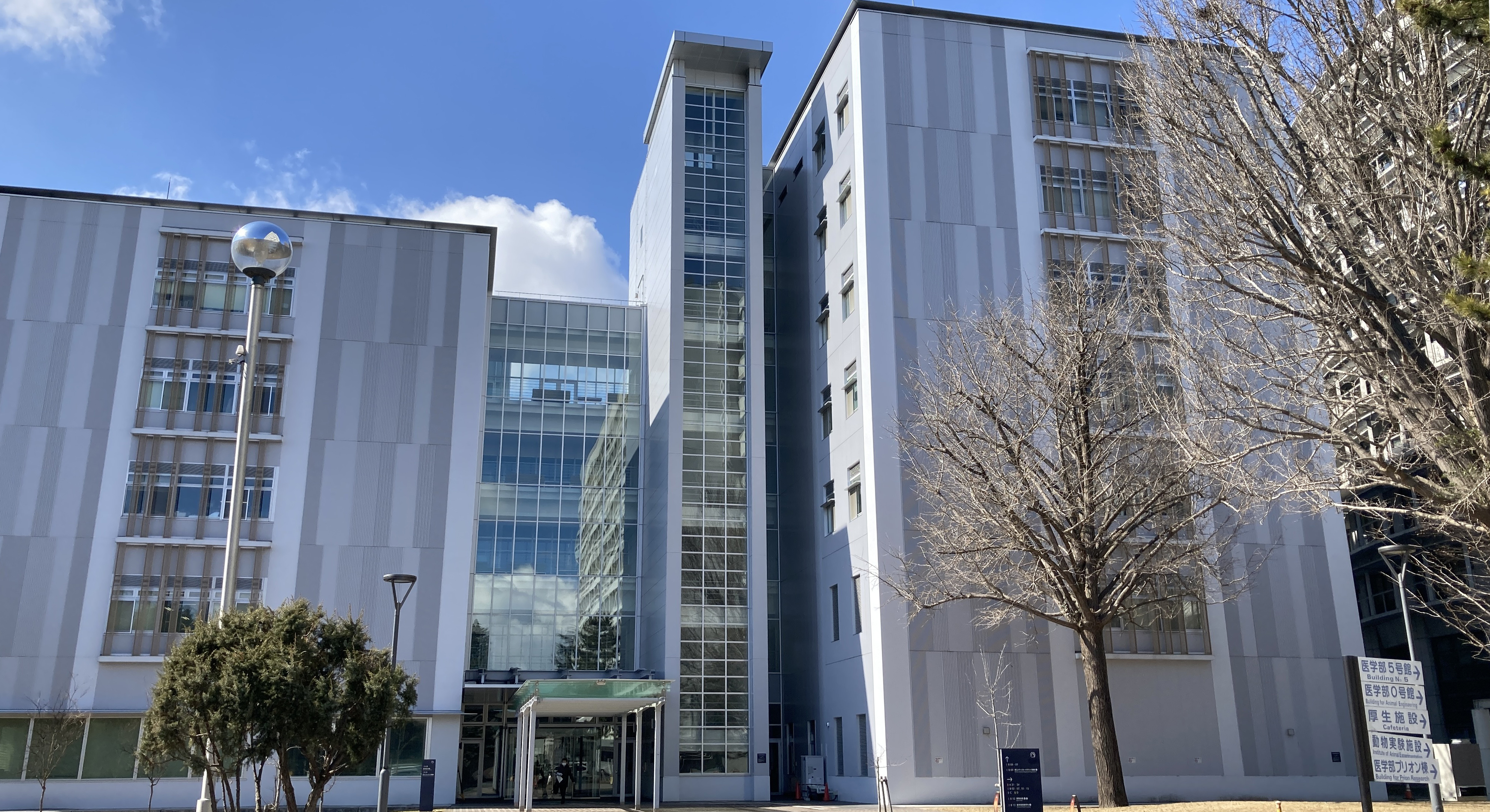
- Building of ToMMo at Tohoku Univ.
- Commercial?: No
- Type of project: Prospective cohort study
- Location: Sendai, Miyagi, JAPAN (ToMMo) and Shiwa-gun, Iwate, JAPAN (IMM)
- Key people: Hideo Harigae (Executive Director, ToMMo) Kozo Tanno (Executive Director, IMM)
- Established: 2012

The Tohoku Medical Megabank Project is a national project in Japan, which started in 2012. The mission of the Tohoku Medical Megabank (TMM) project is to carry out a long-term health survey in the Miyagi and Iwate prefectures, which were affected by the Great East Japan Earthquake, and provide the research infrastructure for the development of personalized medicine by establishing a biobank and conducting cohort studies.

The TMM project is conducted by Tohoku University's Tohoku Medical Megabank Organization (ToMMo) and Iwate Medical University's Iwate Tohoku Medical Megabank Organization (IMM).

== Projects ==
The following cohort studies and research projects are in progress or completed.

=== Prospective cohort studies ===
- Community-based cohort.

The study recruited over 80,000 participants, with 50,000 from Miyagi Prefecture and 30,000 from Iwate Prefecture.

- Birth and Three-generation cohort.

The study recruited over 70,000 participants, including over 23,000 newborns and their parents, siblings, grandparents, and extended family members.

- Biobanking and database.

The project has been collecting various specimens, including peripheral and cord blood mononuclear cells, Buffy coat, plasma, serum, urine, breast milk, and saliva.

- Return of results to participants (including genomic information).

=== Research projects ===
- Whole genome sequencing with short-read and long-read technologies.

The project provides allele frequencies of SNVs (single nucleotide variants) and short Indels (insertions/deletions) based on short-read whole genome sequencing (WGS) analysis of 61,000 unrelated Japanese individuals, extracted from a full dataset of 100,000 individuals, as well as allele frequencies of structural variants based on long-read WGS analysis of 1,400 individuals.

- SNP array Genotyping.

The project designed ethnic-specific SNP arrays optimized for the Japanese population and performed a series of GWAS analyses and polygenic predictions with the cohort samples.

- Construction of Japanese reference genome.

The project constructed a reference genome for Japanese by integrating de novo assemblies of three Japanese individuals.

- Plasma metabolome analysis with NMR and Mass spectrometry.

Plasma metabolome analysis has been conducted to identify individual variations in blood metabolites, establish population-wide metabolic profiles, and perform metabolome-genome-wide association studies (mGWAS).

- Proteome analysis.
- Transcriptome analysis.
- Epigenome analysis.

DNA methylation analysis has been conducted to investigate epigenetic variation, biological age acceleration, and longevity profiles.

- Oral Microbiome analysis.

Oral microbiome analysis has been conducted on saliva and plaque samples to characterize microbial composition, identify variations associated with oral health and periodontal disease, and integrate microbiome data with host genomic and clinical profiles.

== Timeline ==
2013

- Recruitment of TMM Community-Based Cohort starts.
- Recruitment of TMM Birth and Three-Generation Cohort Study starts.

2014

- Japanese genome reference panel (1KJPN), which shows variant allele frequency based on whole genome sequencing of 1,070 cohort participants, is released (draft version 2014, official version 2015).
- Japonica array, a SNP array optimized for Japanese population by taking advantage of 1KJPN haplotype information, is released.

2015

- A portal site of Japanese Multi Omics Reference Panel (jMorp), providing metabolome and proteome data from the cohort participants, is opened. As of 2022, jMorp covers metabolome, proteome, transcriptome, methylome, as well as genome reference panel.

2016

- Recruitment of TMM Community-Based Cohort is finished with over 80,000 participants.

2017

- Recruitment of TMM Birth and Three-Generation Cohort Study is finished with over 70,000 participants.
- The second followup survey starts.

2018

- Japanese genome reference panel (3.5KJPNv2), which shows variant allele frequency based on whole genome sequencing of 3,554 cohort participants, is released (published in 2019).

2019

- Japanese reference genome (JG1) is released (published in 2021).
- Distribution of 67,000 TMM Community-Based Cohort samples data starts.
- Japanese genome reference panel (4.7KJPN) is released.
- Japonica array NEO, a SNP array optimized for Japanese population by taking advantage of 3.5KJPN haplotype information, is released (published in 2021).

2020

- Distribution of 54,000 SNP array data starts.
- Distribution of TMM Birth and Three-Generation Cohort samples data starts.
- Japanese genome reference panel (8.3KJPN) is released.
- Japanese reference genome (JG2) is released.

2021

- The third followup survey starts.
- Japanese genome reference panel (14KJPN) is released.
- JSV1, a structural variation panel, which is constructed with long-read sequencing data, is released.

2022

- Whole genome sequencing of 50,000 cohort participants was finished.
- Japanese genome reference panel (38KJPN) is released.

2023

- Whole genome sequencing of 69,000 cohort participants was finished.
- Japanese genome reference panel (54KJPN) is released. Data is available through the portal site, jMorp.

2024

- Whole genome sequencing of 100,000 cohort participants was finished.
- The Japanese reference genome (JG3.0.0), which has been significantly updated from JG2.0 based on Nanopore ultra-long and PacBio HiFi data, has been released.

2026

- The fourthh followup survey starts.
- Whole genome sequencing (short-read) of 120,000 cohort participants was finished.
- Whole genome sequencing (long-read) of 1,400 cohort participants was finished, leading to the release of JSV2, a structural variation panel based on these data.
