= Iddo Patt =

American film director

- Occupations: co-founder, Eventive, advertiser
- Employer: Eventive
- Parent(s): Yehuda Patt, Nurit Patt

Iddo Patt is a filmmaker, business executive, and television advertiser who lives in Memphis, Tennessee. He is the founder of Modern Production Concepts, a television and radio advertising company, and co-founder of Eventive, a film festival ticketing platform. Iddo Patt served as associate producer for Keep the Lights On, a film directed by Ira Sachs.

== Personal life and education ==
After graduating from Harvard University, he moved to Memphis, Tennessee, where he currently resides.

Iddo Patt also appeared in one episode of the 2000 remake of the game show Twenty One, hosted by Maury Povich, as a challenger to Rahim Oberholtzer.

== Career ==
A series of commercials for Graceland, Elvis's home, were produced by Patt in 2005. This was the first time television ads were created for Graceland.

Iddo Patt was the co-director of Ad Man, a short film, which won the Best Short Film award at Indie Memphis 2006.

After serving as VP/Head of Broadcast for Thompson & Company, a Memphis-based advertising firm, Patt founded his own company, Modern Production Concepts, in 2006.

In 2009, Patt joined the board of the American Advertising Federation.

Robyn Hitchcock: Trams, Jams, and Elvis and Burning Ice, two documentaries about surrealist musician Robyn Hitchcock, were also directed by Patt.

He served as associate producer on Keep the Lights On, a film by Ira Sachs, in 2012.

In 2012, Iddo Patt became the board president of Indie Memphis, an arts organization that hosts a yearly film festival. He began his involvement with the organization in 2006 when he entered his own short film, "Ad Man" into its festival.

In 2018, Patt founded a film festival ticketing system known as Eventive together with his son Theo, which originally began as part of Indie Memphis.

== Awards ==
Patt has won numerous awards for his television and radio advertisements.
