= Strange Son =

2007 nonfiction book by Portia Iversen

- First edition cover
- Author: Portia Iversen
- Language: English
- Subject: Autism
- Genre: Autobiography
- Publisher: Penguin Books
- Publication date: 2007
- Publication place: United States
- Pages: 431
- ISBN: 978-1-59448-272-4

Strange Son: Two Mothers, Two Sons, and the Quest to Unlock the Hidden World of Autism is a 2007 book by Portia Iversen. It concerns the development of her second son, Dov, who started expressing autistic characteristics around age two, and how she used the pseudoscientific technique rapid prompting method with him and believes it has helped him.

== Plot summary ==
Iversen's second son Dov, born in 1992, developed typically as an infant. At age two, he began reacting atypically to noises and also made unusual noises himself. He was nonverbal at age three and fascinated by objects. These characteristics resulted in an autism diagnosis. Dov was still nonverbal at age eight.

Iverson heard about an autistic boy named Tito who lived in Bangalore with his mother, Soma Mukhopadhyay. She heard Mukhopadhyay had taught her son how to speak, write poetry, and explain how the poetry made him feel.

Hoping Mukhopadhyay might also be able to help Dov communicate, Iverson invited Mukhopadhyay and Tito to California for a month. In the end, Iverson believed Mukhopadhyay's rapid prompting method helped Dov start communicating with her.

== Cure Autism Now ==
Iverson's husband, Jon Shestack, founded Cure Autism Now (CAN), an organization that aimed to find a cure for autism and increase society's understanding of autistic people. A part of Strange Son sales benefited CAN's Innovative Technology for Autism initiative. CAN merged with Autism Speaks in 2007.

== Reception ==
Critics of rapid prompting method, a pseudoscientific technique, have criticized the book for supporting it.

Ernst VanBergeijk of Journal of Autism and Developmental Disorders found it disappointing that Iverson briefly mentioned that Dov began expressing autistic characteristics following vaccination, stating, "This causal impression does a disservice to families" because of "mountains of data finding no causal link between vaccines and autism".

Abigail Zuger, M.D., writing for The New York Times, highlighted how the book does not gloss over problems as is common in other books that detail medical stories.

Regis Schilken of Blogcritics said, "Strange Son should be read by psychiatrists, psychologists, doctors, counselors, and at all costs, by politicians who must provide money for autism research."
