= Iddo =

Iddo may refer to:

- Iddo (prophet), a minor Hebrew prophet
- Iddo, Florida, an unincorporated community in Florida
- Iddo, a fictional dog in The Magician's Elephant
- Iddo Island, in Lagos, Nigeria
- Iddo-Okpella, a village in Nigeria
- Iddo-Caddays, a town in Somalia
- "Iddo Bridge", a poem by Nigerian poet J. P. Clark

== Given name ==
- Iddo Goldberg, actor
- Iddo Moed, Israeli diplomat
- Iddo Munro, (1888 – 1980) Australian racing cyclist
- Iddo Netanyahu, physician, author and playwright
- Iddo Patt, filmmaker and television advertiser
- Iddo Porat, associate professor of constitutional law at the College of Law and Business, Israel

== See also ==
- Ido (disambiguation)
