= Elizabeth Newson =

British developmental psychologist (1929–2014)

Elizabeth Newson OBE
- in 1968
- Born: Elizabeth Ann Palmer; 8 April 1929; Highgate
- Died: 6 February 2014 (aged 84)
- Occupation: Developmental psychologist
- Known for: Work with children on the autism spectrum
- Spouse: John Newson

Professor Elizabeth Ann Newson OBE (8 April 1929 – 6 February 2014) was a British developmental psychologist recognised for her work with children on the autism spectrum. She proposed the condition pathological demand avoidance in 1980.

== Life ==
Newson was born in Highgate, London to Mary and Richard Palmer. She was the first of their four children. Her parents were committed socialists and they took in a Jewish girl who had been sent for safety from Germany. Later they gave a home to her parents as well.

She married John Newson and in 1955 they had their first child, Roger, who had very disruptive sleep patterns. Parenting manuals and academic articles, to which they had easy access, were of little use in explaining their child's behaviour so they set out to investigate this themselves. Using their own funds they arranged interviews with 700 families. Health workers helped but Elizabeth conducted 200 interviews herself and her husband spent many hours creating punch cards in the computer centre at the University of Nottingham to enable the data to be processed. The interviews were conducted without judgement and they recorded what the parents wanted to say.

The Child Development Research Unit opened in 1958 at the University of Nottingham with Newson and her husband as joint directors. In 1965 their studies led to "Patterns of Infant Care in an Urban Community" being published by Penguin. Their work placed particular emphasis on toys and learning through play, as well as on the needs of children with conditions such as autism. In 1968 she and a group of parents formed "Autism East Midlands" to support assistance for families around Nottingham.

In 1980 she proposed the term pathological demand avoidance to describe people who do not want to co-operate with instructions even when this would be in their own interest. She had identified a group of children who had this characteristic and they would "avoid everyday demands and expectations to an extreme extent".

The work of Elizabeth and John Newson emphasised that social class and cultural influences created a range of beliefs about childrearing. Their work did not fit into established academic categories: psychologists considered it too sociological and sociologists too psychological.

In 1993, the Royal College of Paediatrics and Child Health made her an honorary fellow and the following year the In 1994 the Early Years Diagnostic Centre was renamed the Elizabeth Newson Centre. Five years later she was given an OBE for her work with children on the autism spectrum in the 1999 New Year Honours.

== Death and legacy ==
Newson died in 2014. In 2018, her "Autism East Midlands" charity celebrated 50 years of achievements and her and her husband's work studying 11 year olds, "Childhood into Adolescence: Growing up in the 1970s" was eventually published. New sections were added and it was published with Peter Barnes and Susan Gregory as editors.

== Private life ==
She married John Newson and they had several children. John died in 2010.

== Works ==
- Patterns of Infant Care in an Urban Community
- Four Years Old in An Urban Community (1968)
- Seven Years Old in the Home Environment (1976) and
- Perspectives On School at Seven Years Old (1977)
- Pathological demand avoidance syndrome: a necessary distinction within the pervasive developmental disorders (2003) lead author
- Childhood into Adolescence: Growing up in the 1970s (2018)
