= Autism Genetic Resource Exchange =

DNA biobank funded by Autism Speaks

- Company type: Biobank
- Predecessor: Cure Autism Now
- Founded: 1990s
- Website: autismspeaks.org/agre

The Autism Genetic Resource Exchange (AGRE) is a DNA biobank funded by Autism Speaks. It exists as a DNA repository and family registry of genotypic and phenotypic information available to autism researchers worldwide

== History ==
AGRE was established in the 1990s by a predecessor organization, Cure Autism Now.

Cure Autism Now was a Los Angeles-based non-profit organization founded in 1995 by Jonathan Shestack and Portia Iversen, the parents of an autistic child, whose story is told in the book Strange Son. Cure Autism Now was an organization of parents, doctors and scientists devoted to research to prevent, treat and cure autism. In 1997, Cure Autism Now established AGRE despite initial resistance from scientists to begin a project that conflicted with existing practices.

== Projects ==
In October 2011, AGRE announced a plan to create the world's largest library of sequenced human genomes of individuals with autism-related genes, representing 2000 families and 10000 individuals. To do this, AGRE will provide specimens to the Beijing Genomics Institute, who would perform the sequencing.
