= Impute.me =

impute.me
Content
- Description: A polygenic risk score calculator for human diseases and traits
- Data types captured: single-nucleotide polymorphisms, genotypes, genes, variation
- Organisms: Homo sapiens

Contact
- Primary citation: PMID 32714365

Access
- Website: www.impute.me

Miscellaneous
- License: GNU Lesser General Public License v3.0

Impute.me was an open-source non-profit web application that allowed members of the public to use their data from direct-to-consumer (DTC) genetic tests (including tests from 23andMe and Ancestry.com) to calculate polygenic risk scores (PRS) for complex diseases and cognitive and personality traits. In July 2022, Lasse Folkerson, initiator and operator of impute.me, took the website offline.

Impute.me calculates PRSs, which are used to estimate the risk of developing complex diseases from the combined effects of numerous common single nucleotide polymorphisms in the human genome.

It is intended for use by people who have obtained genetics data from a direct to consumer genetic testing company. If they upload the files, the uploaded data is expanded into ungenotyped SNPs and the overlap with public GWAS summary statistics used to estimate risk. The data is then subjected to analysis scripts including PRS calculations for approximately 2,000 traits and complex diseases. PRSs are calculated based on the combined effect of all SNPs reported in the summary statistics of the underlying GWAS or of the top, genome-wide significant SNPs in the underlying GWAS. The scores based on all SNPs are only available for about 20 complex diseases and traits. Users can then make use of the web tool GenoPred to translate their PRSs onto an absolute risk scale using summary statistics from the GWAS studies.

== Criticisms ==
Numerous criticisms have been raised against consumers accessing their own genetic information, including findings that more than 30% of direct-to-consumer related contacts to clinical genetics departments involve the use of imputed risk estimates and that third party genetics analysis site generally invoke science's power without accepting its limits, while failing to make clear the limitations and potential dangers. In addition there are concerns that many people will react negatively to accessing their own polygenic risk scores, with findings that over 5% of users score over the threshold for potential post-traumatic stress disorder. Notably, this criticism match the FDA-regulation imposed on the major direct-to-consumer genetics company 23andme.
