= Pathological demand avoidance =

Behavioral profile

- Other names: Persistent drive (for) autonomy, extreme demand avoidance, demand avoidance, demand avoidance phenomenon, rational demand avoidance
- Specialty: Psychiatry
- Symptoms: Task avoidance, anxiety, need to control, social manipulation, masking, emotional lability, intolerance of uncertainty

Pathological demand avoidance (PDA), or extreme demand avoidance (EDA), or persistent drive (for) autonomy (PDA) is a behavioral profile characterized by an intense resistance to complying with requests or expectations and extreme efforts to avoid social demands. As it is not recognized as an independent syndrome, PDA is not included as a diagnosis defined in the International Classification of Diseases (ICD-11) or the Diagnostic and Statistical Manual of Mental Disorders, and it is also not included among criteria (such as symptoms and signs) defining other diagnoses. PDA is thought to involve a highly sensitive nervous system in which perceived threats—particularly demands or limits on autonomy—can trigger fight, flight, or freeze responses, even when those threats are not obvious to others. It is suggested that any expectation or activity, such as brushing teeth or getting ready to leave home to visit a playground, can trigger avoidant behavior. If the demand cannot be avoided, a panic attack or a meltdown may ensue.

== Signs and symptoms ==
The primary sign is an atypical resistance to normal, everyday social demands. For the purposes of PDA, a demand may be presented within a social interaction, or it may involve another direct or implied expectation to cooperate. It encompasses things that are interpreted as demands, such as being told to do homework, as well as societal expectations or requests (e.g., someone silently offering to shake hands). Individuals with PDA display a resistance to everyday demands in a manner that is obsessive and dramatically beyond typical behavior. The resistance to demands may also apply to demands that they make on themselves, such as preparing for a self-chosen favorite activity, and even to internal demands such as hunger or the need to use the restroom.

When people with PDA perceive a demand, they often use socially strategic tactics to avoid it. For example, they may try to ignore the demand or distract the person issuing the demand by changing the subject, offering imaginative excuses, or renegotiating agreements on when the demand will be fulfilled. If the demand persists, they may escalate to intentionally shocking behavior, such as (in children) deliberately kicking someone to get out of doing something; shame or remorse for such inappropriate or infantile behavior is often not communicated.

PDA is a spectrum, meaning its symptoms present differently depending on the individual. For example, PDA can be identified as internalized or externalized. Someone with internalized PDA may become withdrawn when they are triggered, rely on less obvious social strategies to avoid demands, and even comply in a perfectionistic manner in an attempt to neutralize the threat of the demand. Internalized PDA reactions are no less intense than externalized reactions; they are simply more hidden from public view. Furthermore, those with internalized PDA are more likely to experience avoidance behaviors when their trigger came from an internal decision. Externalized PDA includes an individual being expressive with their reactions when they have been exposed to a trigger, possibly resulting in meltdowns, panic attacks, controlling behavior, aggression, and anxiety.

=== In adults ===
PDA is observed in adults as well. The limited representation of adults in the literature makes it difficult to determine how demand avoidance behaviors present in adulthood. One of the reasons for this is the absence of a reliable tool for systematically studying these traits in adults.

== Identification ==
PDA has never been included in the Diagnostic and Statistical Manual of Mental Disorders (DSM) or the International Classification of Diseases (ICD), and therefore has no diagnostic criteria. To be recognized, a sufficient amount of consensus and clinical history needs to be present, and as a newly proposed condition, PDA had not met the standard of evidence required at the time of recent revisions, however, patients that exhibited PDA behaviors were later diagnosed with autism using the DSM.

=== Extreme Demand Avoidance Questionnaire ===
The 26-item Extreme Demand Avoidance Questionnaire (EDA-Q) was designed for research, but has been used as an aid to identification in children. In 2021, this was reduced to an 8-item questionnaire (EDA-8). The shorter version, which has less bias in terms of gender and academic skills, retains questions from the original version such as whether the child will use "outrageous or shocking behavior" to avoid a demand, whether the child's mood changes rapidly, and whether the child is unaware of or indifferent to social hierarchies and the role of authority figures. The original questionnaire has been lightly adapted to be more appropriate for adults (EDA-QA).

However, the EDA-Q has been criticized for its methodological limitations, particularly its reliance on circular reasoning. PDA research often lacks methodological rigor, with many studies using tools like the EDA-Q, which was developed based on criteria derived from Newson et al.’s (2003) original descriptions rather than independent validation.

=== Associated conditions ===
PDA is typically associated with autism, though a correlation with attention deficit hyperactivity disorder (ADHD) has also been found. Emotional lability and hostility are other traits possibly associated with PDA.

One study found that while approximately 20% of autistic individuals exhibited some traits associated with PDA in childhood, only about 4% fully met the criteria for PDA. These findings raise questions regarding whether PDA constitutes a lifelong condition or is primarily a childhood-specific presentation. The study suggests that while PDA may represent a minority subset of ASD diagnoses in childhood, the diagnostic criteria for PDA are unlikely to be consistently met in later adolescence and early adulthood.

Commonly associated features of PDA include:

- an appearance of social skills that are superficially acceptable but which have odd features, such as (in children) a belief that the normal rules apply only to other people, or that they have the same authority as adults or people in positions of authority
- emotional lability, such as being affectionate one moment and angry the next, and impulsive and controlling behaviors
- being comfortable with role-playing and pretending to be other characters
- "soft" signs of neurological divergence, such as language delay, obsessive behavior, delayed milestones, or clumsiness
- high anxiety, low tolerance for routine tasks, difficulty complying with requests, and (in children) a tendency for typical rewards or consequences to backfire.
- sensory and interoceptive differences.

== Causes ==
The underlying cause of demand avoidance is unknown. Many individuals identified with PDA also have a co-occurring anxiety disorder, such as generalized anxiety disorder. Research has explored intolerance of uncertainty as a potential contributing factor to PDA, as individuals with PDA may exhibit extreme avoidance behaviors in response to unpredictable situations or demands. About 40% of autistic people have an anxiety disorder.

== History ==
Elizabeth Newson investigated PDA as a separate disorder from autism in the 1980s at the Child Development Research Clinic of Nottingham in England. She proposed it as a pervasive developmental disorder (PDD), but emphasized that it is distinct from autism spectrum disorder, noting that "PDA is a pervasive developmental disorder but not an autistic spectrum disorder; to describe it as such would be like describing every person in a family by the name of one of its members." This perspective reinforces that PDA was not intended to be synonymous with autism from its inception.

When Newson was made professor of developmental psychology at the University of Nottingham in 1994, she dedicated her inaugural lecture to talking about pathological demand avoidance syndrome.

In 1997, the PDA Society was established in the UK by parents of children with a PDA profile. It became a registered charity in January 2016.

In July 2003, Newson published in Archives of Disease in Childhood advocating for PDA to be recognized as a separate syndrome within the pervasive developmental disorders. The major criteria included socially manipulative behaviour as well as excess lability of mood as being particularly discriminant between PDA, autism and Asperger's disorder.

In 2020, an incorporated association was established in Australia. Pathological Demand Avoidance Australia, Inc. became a registered charity early 2021.

In March 2020, the first American PDA conference was held. Soon after, PDA North America was formed. It became a registered charity in 2022.

== Society and culture ==
Lacking a solid scientific foundation, professionals, regular people and adults with PDA have created support websites. A study of how adults with PDA experience daily life was conducted.

=== Naming controversy ===
Pathological demand avoidance has been criticized as a name for various reasons, including the negative connotations some confronted with the word pathological might have. For example, autistic social psychologists Damian Milton and Devon Price have suggested the behavior should not be considered pathological. They view PDA as an example of individual autonomy or self-advocacy. Alternative names like rational demand avoidance (RDA) or pervasive drive for autonomy have been proposed and used.
