= Devon Price =

American social psychologist and writer

- Born: April 13, 1988 (age 38); Middleburg Heights, Ohio, U.S.
- Education: Ohio State University; Loyola University Chicago
- Scientific career
- Fields: Social psychology
- Workplaces: Loyola University Chicago

Devon Price is an American social psychologist, author, and blogger, focusing on autism.

Price (Note: Price uses it/its pronouns or avoids pronouns entirely. This article refers to Price by surname instead of using pronouns.) is best known for writing the books Unmasking Autism: Discovering the New Faces of Neurodiversity and Laziness Does Not Exist, as well as for publishing shorter pieces on Medium and Psychology Today.

== Career ==
Price graduated with a Bachelor of Arts in psychology and political science from Ohio State University in 2009. After obtaining a Master of Science and PhD from Loyola University Chicago, Price has taught at Loyola as a clinical assistant professor at the School of Continuing and Professional Studies since 2012.

Price, who is autistic (Note: In this context, a definition of autism inclusive of self-diagnosis is in use.) and transgender, has written works exploring themes such as autistic identity, trans identity, and masking. Price identifies as autistic and is a proponent of self-diagnosis. Price criticizes clinical evaluations, framing autism as a non-pathological social identity, while also acknowledging it as a neurodevelopmental disability. Price has also delved into the intersectional nature of neurodiversity and the experiences of autistic people of color.

Price's book Unmasking Autism has been cited in academic papers that explore autism from various angles including autism in women and attitudes in college students. Price has spoken on pathological demand avoidance, contextualizing it as an act of consent and self-advocacy.

Price has also written about the concepts of laziness, productivity and self-worth. Price's book, Laziness Does Not Exist grew out of a viral blog post. The book makes the claim that laziness is a sign of other mental health issues. Laziness Does Not Exist has been cited in academic discussions of techniques for education.

Price writes a Substack blog covering topics including autism, gender identity, kink, and politics. Price has a Tumblr account, with replies to questions from readers.

== Bibliography ==
- Price, Devon (2025). Unmasking for Life: The Autistic Person's Guide to Connecting, Loving, and Living Authentically. Harmony. ISBN 9780593735756.
- Price, Devon (2024). Unlearning Shame: How We Can Reject Self-Blame Culture and Reclaim Our Power. Harmony. ISBN 978-0-59358-121-6.
- Price, Devon (2022). Unmasking Autism: Discovering the New Faces of Neurodiversity. New York: Harmony. ISBN 978-0-593-23523-2.
- Price, Devon (2021). Laziness Does Not Exist: A Defense of the Exhausted, Exploited, and Overworked. New York: Atria Books. ISBN 978-1-982140-10-6.
