= Rapid prompting method =

Pseudoscientific communication technique

Alternative medicine
- Claims: Non-verbal people may express written language if given prompts by a facilitator.
- Related fields: Alternative medicine
- Year proposed: Late 20th century
- Original proponents: Soma Mukhopadhyay

The rapid prompting method (RPM) is a pseudoscientific technique that attempts to aid people with autism or other disabilities to communicate through pointing, typing, or writing. Also known as Spelling to Communicate and Spellers Method, it is closely related to the scientifically discredited technique of facilitated communication. Practitioners of RPM have failed to assess the issue of message agency using simple and direct scientific methodologies, saying that doing so would be stigmatizing and that allowing scientific criticisms of the technique robs people with autism of their right to communicate. The American Speech-Language-Hearing Association has issued a statement opposing the practice of RPM.

Soma Mukhopadhyay is credited with creating RPM, though others have developed similar techniques, known as informative pointing or alphabet therapy. RPM users report unexpected literacy skills in their clients, as well as a reduction in some of the behavioral issues associated with autism. As noted by Stuart Vyse, although RPM differs from facilitated communication in some ways, "it has the same potential for unconscious prompting because the letter board is always held in the air by the assistant. As long as the method of communication involves the active participation of another person, the potential for unconscious guidance remains."

Critics warn that RPM's over-reliance on prompts (verbal and physical cuing by facilitators) may inhibit development of independent communication in its target population. As of April 2017, only one scientific study attempting to support Mukhopadhyay's claims of efficacy has been conducted, though reviewers found the study had serious methodological flaws. Vyse has noted that rather than proponents of RPM subjecting the methodology to properly controlled validation research, they have responded to criticism by going on the offensive, claiming that scientific criticisms of the technique rob people with autism of their right to communicate, while the authors of a 2019 review concluded that "...until future trials have demonstrated safety and effectiveness, and perhaps more importantly, have first clarified the authorship question, we strongly discourage clinicians, educators, and parents of children with ASD from using RPM."

== Overview ==
RPM founder Mukhopadhyay purports to base RPM on psychological, developmental and behavioral theories put forth by Jean Piaget (developmental psychology) and Anna Jean Ayres (sensory integration), the goal of which is to "establish functional independent pointing-based communication in people who are otherwise nonverbal due to severe autism or other developmental disabilities." RPM users employ elements of Applied Behavior Analysis (ABA), but reject the documentation and evaluation procedures integral to ABA as being unnecessary and stigmatizing. Mukhopadhyay postulates that, by observing student's self-stimulatory behaviors (as in the case of autism, the "sensory preoccupations that drive and develop them"), she can identify each student's "dominant learning channel" (visual, tactile, or auditory) and individualize a program to match his or her needs. RPM facilitators "presume competence" in their (often nonspeaking) communication partners; the assumption being that people with autism "are likely to possess considerable hidden knowledge that they cannot express" and that prompting will address these individuals' hypothesized difficulties with motor planning and self-stimulatory behaviors. RPM is a "low-tech approach that requires only an instructor, student, paper, and pencil".

=== Certification and licensing ===
As of April 2017, RPM is not recognized as a clinical profession nor does it have recognized standards for registering, licensing or certifying treatment providers. Practitioners appear to be self-taught or have participated in workshops and camps offered by Mukhopadhyay, Heather Clare (Informative Pointing), or Vanderbilt Kennedy Center Angelman Program (Alphabet Therapy).

Professionals applying for RPM workshops are required to submit 10-min video samples of the use of rapid prompting, a resume, and a letter explaining the "reason for wanting to attend course".

=== Targeted populations ===
RPM literature indicates that, along with autism, the technique has been tried with people who have Fragile X syndrome, blindness, deafness, Angelman syndrome, Down syndrome, Williams syndrome, and Prader-Willi syndrome.

=== Practices and procedures ===
Beginning with a "teach–ask" protocol, the facilitator presents the student with a concept (i.e., The chair is yellow), then immediately follows up with a question (i.e., "What color is the chair?"). The student is then given prompts (i.e., two pieces of paper, with choices written on each) to represent the answer. This procedure is repeated, using a combination of prompts provided by the facilitator to elicit a response. Prompts may include physical (i.e. words written on paper), auditory (i.e. the sound of paper tearing), verbal (i.e. spoken directives), and visual (i.e. gestures by the facilitator). Choices move from two, three, to four and so on, with increased difficulty. The student progresses from making choices, to spelling on a letter board held by the facilitator, to spelling on a letter board (flat on a table or held by the student) or voice-output device, independently.

== Historical background ==
The rapid prompting method (also known as RPM, Rapid Prompting, Soma®RPM, Informative Pointing, Spelling To Communicate (S2C), Spellers Method, and Alphabet Therapy) is largely credited to Soma Mukhopadhyay, who has a master's degree in chemistry and a bachelor's in education. By trial and error, Mukhopadhyay combined various behavioral and communication techniques to help her son, Tito, who has a diagnosis of autism and exhibits limited speaking abilities. Mukhopadhyay posits that autism is a manifestation in which a child's cognitive abilities are undermined by poor sensory integration abilities and that RPM serves to "activate the reasoning part of the brain" and, therefore, distracts the student into learning. Proponents of RPM and related techniques claim to be able to help people with disabilities express untapped intellectual abilities and advance communication skills through a system of pointing, typing, or writing with verbal and physical prompts from a facilitator. This is, purportedly, "the most direct and unlimited path to learning and communicating." RPM proponents point to the "sole study of RPM", "Harnessing repetitive behaviours to engage attention and learning in a novel therapy for autism: An exploratory analysis", published in the journal Frontiers in Psychology (2012), as proof of the method's efficacy.

In 2001, Mukhopadhyay brought RPM to the United States, in conjunction with a fellowship from the Cure Autism Now Foundation, led by Portia Iversen and Jon Shestack.

In 2004, Mukhopadhyay and Helping Autism through Learning and Outreach (HALO) collaborated to expand RPM's reach nationally. Mukhopadhyay owns the trademark for RPM.

In 2005, Mukhopadhyay moved from California to Austin, Texas, where she established the Halo-Soma Institute. There, she provides clinical services, offers workshops and promotes RPM internationally. Evaluation research is not conducted by the institute. Mukhopadhyay is the author of Rapid Prompting: an Instructional Guide, Understanding Autism through Rapid Prompting (2008) and Curriculum Guide for Autism Using Rapid Prompting Method: with Lesson Plan Suggestions (2011).

After some initial collaboration with Mukhopadhyay, Iversen developed the Informative Pointing Method. She also wrote a book called Strange Son: Two Mothers, Two Sons, and the Quest to Unlock the Hidden World of Autism, which, as one reviewer stated, expresses her "absorbing and speculative views" on autism which are "at once compelling and controversial." Iversen spends much of the book discussing Tito's communications and documenting her own son, Dov's, introduction to RPM.

Alphabet Therapy was developed and is promoted by Vanderbilt University and focuses specifically on people with Angelman syndrome.

== Organizations opposing rapid prompting method ==
- The American Association on Intellectual and Developmental Disabilities (AAIDD)

The Board of Directors concludes that rather than helping people express their thoughts, desires, and choices, FC and RPM have the potential to effectively take away people's voices. This is due to the risk of facilitator influence/authorship as well as the potential to displace efforts to access scientifically valid communication modes, such as those associated with the field of Augmentative and Alternative Communication (AAC).

— AAIDD

- The American Speech-Language-Hearing Association (ASHA)

It is the position of the American Speech-Language-Hearing Association (ASHA) that use of the Rapid Prompting Method (RPM) is not recommended because of prompt dependency and the lack of scientific validity. Furthermore, information obtained through the use of RPM should not be assumed to be the communication of the person with a disability.

— ASHA

- The Association for Science in Autism Treatment

While the lack of evidence from previously conducted studies does not necessarily indicate that RPM is not effective at developing communication skills and reducing stereotypic behaviors in learners with autism, use of this intervention should not be used or recommended by practitioners until the claims made can be substantiated by peer reviewed research studies.

— ASAT

- The Irish Association of Speech and Language Therapists (IASLT)

Since the broadcast of the RTE documentary ‘Autism and Me’ on March 13th 2017 there has been much discussion about the Rapid Prompting Method (RPM) which was used to facilitate communication for one teenage boy featured on the programme. IASLT wish to put on record our position in relation to this method - primarily our concern that there is no evidence to support its use.

— IASLT

- Speech-Language and Audiology Canada (SAC)

There is a lack of substantive research evidence demonstrating that FC and RPM are valid forms of augmentative or alternative communication ... Research studies show that facilitators consciously and/or unconsciously influence the message being communicated ... thereby exposing people with communication disorders to risk of harm by preventing genuine self-expression ... For these reasons, SAC members and associates should not use FC and RPM in clinical practice.

— SAC

== Criticism ==
=== Empirical evidence ===
RPM proponents point to one study to support their claims of efficacy: "Harnessing repetitive behaviours to engage attention and learning in a novel therapy for autism: An exploratory analysis". In this peer-reviewed, quantitative study using videotaped sessions of Mukhopadhyay working with clients, the study authors attempted to measure how RPM influenced participants' attention to their facilitator and the materials being presented (joint attention) and the effect of RPM on restrictive and stereotypic behaviors (RSB). Although RSBs reduced as joint attention increased, the authors were unable to show that RPM itself had a direct correlation to the behaviors exhibited by the participants or that joint attention increased as a result of its use. Correct answers were observed while students were not engaged with the activity, leading reviewers of the study to ask: "How does the client know how to answer, what the answer options are, or where the letters are located if the client is not looking at the facilitator or at the moving letter board?" The study authors postulated that "direct gaze [at the facilitator or letter board] may actually inhibit the ability to respond correctly." The authors did not investigate authorship of the communications produced during the RPM sessions.

According to reviewers, RPM method does make use of concepts such as errorless learning, response interruption, and redirection. However, these behavioral intervention components are not implemented in a manner consistent with the research-base. Practitioners claim to be responsive to each individual's dominant open sensory channel, the "basic features of training" to not appear to be distinctively different across the channels. Studying RPM's efficacy is made difficult by policies that prevent videotaping of RPM sessions (even of one's own child) and instructional workshops.

Jaswal et al. also continued the pattern of proponents studying the issue of agency in the use of RPM by using indirect, rather than direct (message passing) methodologies. The study found that the non-verbal (according to their reports) autistic individuals in their study (1) made anticipatory eye movements to the next letter in a word prior to touching the letter, (2) had longer pauses in their letter-touching within words than between words, and (3) were faster at touching common letter patterns in sequence than was the case for less common letter patterns. Based upon these indirect indices of message agency, it was concluded that the autistic individuals, rather than the assistants who held the letter boards, were the agents of the messages. Vyse, however, argued that none of these findings provides clear evidence regarding message agency. For example, the longer pauses between words could simply have resulted from the fact that the assistant voiced each word aloud after the final letter of each word was touched. Vyse also argued that the authors have not provided a compelling reason why simpler, and more direct, methods of assessing message agency (some form of message passing methodology) were not used in the study, and why simple controls that could bolster the authors' claims (e.g. placing the letterboard on a stand instead of it being held by the assistant or putting a blindfold on the assistant) were not utilized.

Accordingly, to date, RPM proponents, by resisting participation in studies, have failed to produce methodologically sound, evidence-based studies demonstrating that RPM provides people with autism and other developmental disabilities a reliable and independent method for communicating.

=== Unexpected literacy and extraordinary communication abilities ===
Critics of RPM are concerned that, sometimes even on the first attempt at using the method, people with profound communication and/or developmental disabilities achieve levels of communication or understanding of subject matter beyond what their expected age or exposure to formal education would predict. In some cases, students, with prompting, produce results in a language other than the one he or she has been exposed to, indicating facilitator, rather than student authorship. Facilitators, sympathetic to the RPM goals of ensuring student success, may unknowingly, unintentionally, or unconsciously move the letter board to achieve the desired communication outcome.

=== Prompt dependency ===
In order to point, type or write using RPM, people with disabilities rely on an aide or facilitator to give verbal or gestural prompts and/or hold a letter board during the sessions, which precludes independent communication. Prompts may include verbal reprimands, trial termination, physical redirection, slapping or shaking the letter board against the subject's face or chest, and blocking escape by positioning the subject between the table and walls. Some of the verbal and gestural prompting procedures used in RPM are similar to the Pinchbeck Technique used by conjurers to "create the illusion of letter-by-letter communication."

"It is possible that no actual academic skills are taught to participants in RPM. Instead, participants may only learn how to better follow subtle, rhythmic, and frequent prompts. The danger, of course, is that an untrained observer might not be able to readily recognize such subtle prompts and may mistakenly assume that prompted responses accurately reflect the true preferences, academic abilities, and emotions of the individual. Such an outcome would make RPM equally as dangerous and inhumane as facilitated communication (FC), a thoroughly debunked method that creates a powerful illusion that seems notably similar to RPM."

— Lang, et al. (2014)

Critics point out that there are no procedures in place to prevent students' over reliance on their facilitator. Likewise, there is no purposeful or systematic fading of prompts with RPM, though research-based techniques exist to support transference of prompt-reliant behaviors to "naturally occurring discriminitive stimuli". This reliance on prompts creates a dependency that, essentially, reduces independent communication and increases the chances that the facilitators are authoring the messages. In other words, "accurate responding may not occur unless the aide knows the answers."

Proponents assert that "prompt dependency is preferable to no response" from the subjects.

With advanced computer technology capable of allowing people access to communication with eye movements, critics also question "the validity of any communication method that requires the physical help of someone else." Critics counter this assertion. Prompt dependency creates an active participation in the communication process. Therefore, the "potential for unconscious guidance remains".

=== Facilitated communication ===
Facilitated communication, a technique in which a facilitator supports a person with disabilities at the arm, wrist or hand during the process of typing on a letter board, is closely related to RPM. Controlled studies in the 1990s determined that, when facilitators did not know the answers to questions being asked through FC, the answers were "routinely inaccurate". Facilitators were (unconsciously) authoring the messages.

Proponents of RPM deny similarities with FC because the aide or facilitator in RPM holds the letter board but "does not touch the person typing" and that the prompts are "nonspecific." However, critics of RPM point out that subtle cuing takes place during RPM that makes it "highly susceptible to facilitator influence."

Other similarities between RPM and FC include: reluctance or refusal to test facilitator/client pairs in controlled settings (purportedly because the process breaks the trust between the pair), presumed competence, reliance on anecdotal accounts as proof of efficacy, maintenance of practices, techniques and claims that are inconsistent with the known body of work around the behavior and communication skills of individuals with developmental disabilities or proven remediation techniques, claims of extraordinary literacy or intellectual breakthroughs, unconscious verbal or physical cuing by facilitators to obtain the expected responses, inadequate or non-existent protocols to fade supported or facilitated prompts.

== Media ==
RPM has been featured in several documentary and on several television news programs including: 60 Minutes II, CNN, PBS (How does the autistic brain work?), and National Geographic (Mind Tree Poems, 2005). Mukhopadhyay's son, Tito, featured prominently in a BBC Documentary, Tito's Story, and is given credit for co-authoring (with his mother using RPM), "two poetry books, a collection of short stories, and a book describing his sensory experience." Print sources discussing RPM and the Mukhopadhyays, include The New York Times and Scientific American, the latter of which criticized active proponents for not attempting a scientific study of the method.

The August 2014 documentary film, A Mother's Courage: Talking Back to Autism, was adapted from a 2009 Icelandic film entitled Solskinsdrengurrin (The Sunshine Boy) by Margrét Dagmar Ericsdóttir and Friðrik Þór Friðriksson. The film follows Margret, an Icelandic woman, in her quest to find answers for her 11-year-old son who is severely impaired. Her search leads her to Austin, TX, Mukhopadhyay and RPM.

RPM was featured in an Apple Inc. commercial, which led to criticism of Apple for promoting pseudoscience.

Critics of this type of media attention point out that these programs portray autism as "mysterious in nature", offer anecdotal evidence (i.e., Tito's poetry) as proof that RPM works, and downplay the fact that RPM "does not have research to support it at this time."

A version of RPM was used in the controversial 2024 podcast The Telepathy Tapes.

== Bibliography ==
=== Articles ===
- Evidence does not support the use of Rapid Prompting Method (RPM) as an intervention for students with autism spectrum disorder and further primary research is not justified
- Harnessing repetitive behaviours to engage attention and learning in a novel therapy for autism: An exploratory analysis
- Rapid Prompting Method (RPM): A suitable intervention for students with ASD?
- Voices from the Past: Comparing the Rapid Prompting Method and Facilitated Communication
- Rapid Prompting Method Is Not Consistent with Evidence-Based Reading Instruction for Students with Autism

=== Book chapters ===
- Old horses in new stables: Rapid prompting, facilitated communication, science, ethics, and the history of magic.
