= Canadian Biosample Repository =

Biobank facility in Alberta, Canada

The Canadian BioSample Repository is a biobank facility located on the University of Alberta Campus in Edmonton, Alberta, Canada.

The CBSR is responsible for storing samples of many studies including the Development of a National Program for Research in Severe Asthma: The Canadian Severe Asthma Network (CSAN) study.

== Robotics ==
=== Liquid Handling ===
The CBSR is notable for its development of an innovative liquid handling robot for sample processing in the Blood Borne Pathogens Surveillance project. The Robot is based on a SCARA arm and is notable for its unique vision system. The vision system is capable of measuring the volume of liquid contained in a liquid source tube using only a web camera and open source software from RoboRealm. It is accurate to within 0.5%. The Robot can pipette onto FTA paper for dry, room temp DNA storage as well as into barcoded cryotubes for Ultra Low Temperature (ULT) storage.

=== Sample Storage ===
The CBSR is currently developing a robotic system to operate within an Ultra Low Temperature (ULT) environment. This system will be capable of handling up to 600 cryotubes an hour and will keep the samples at or below -80 °C throughout their handling and storage.
