= Ido Zelkovitz =

Israeli historian and researcher

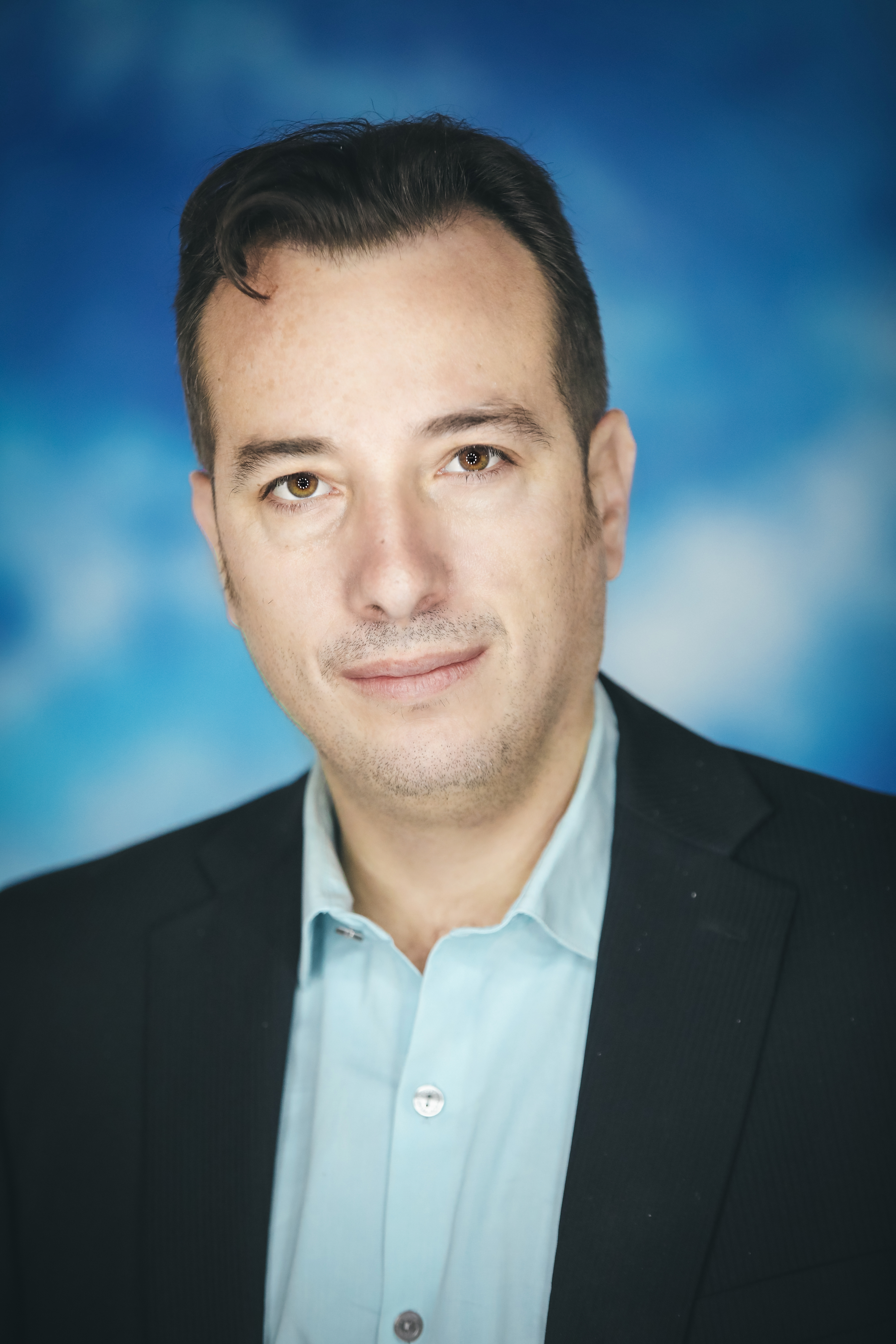
Dr. Ido Zelkovitz

Ido Zelkovitz (Hebrew: עידו זלקוביץ) is an Israeli historian and researcher of the modern Middle East. His research focuses on cross-disciplinary analysis of the Palestinian History and Politics, the Arab-Israeli Conflict, Israel's geopolitical situation in the Middle East and the role of Higher Education and Students in Middle East politics.

== Early life and education ==
Zelkovitz was born in Haifa. In his youth he played basketball for Hapoel Haifa B.C. He received his PhD in 2011 from The University of Haifa. His doctoral thesis focused on the role of higher education and the shaping of Palestinian national identity and was written under the supervision of Mahmoud Yazbak.

== Career ==
In 2012 he was a post-doctoral research fellow at The Center of Methods in Social Sciences and the Institute of Sociology at the University of Göttingen, Germany, after he won the prestigious Erasmus Mundus Post-doctorate fellowship from the European Union. The grant was used to conduct research on the role of higher education and social networking in a context of politics of survival among the Palestinian community in Kuwait. In 2014 Zelkovitz was the Schusterman Visiting Professor in the Department of Political Science at the University of Minnesota. In 2016 he was appointed as a Senior Lecturer and as the Head of the Middle Eastern Studies Program at the Max Stern Yezreel Valley College.

== Other academic roles ==
Dr Zelkovitz served as a research fellow from 2009 to 2022 at the Ezri Center for Iran & Persian Gulf Studies at the University of Haifa. Since 2022, he has been a research fellow at the Chaikin Chair for Geostrategy at the University of Haifa. He lectures at the University of Haifa and Reichman University. He is also a Policy Fellow in Mitvim - The Israeli Institute for Regional Foreign Policies, where he writes policy papers mainly aimed for Diplomats and Decision Makers. Dr. Ido Zelkovitz is also a member of the executive board of the Israeli Association for Middle Eastern and Islamic Studies.

== Books ==
- Fatah: Islam, Nationalism and Politics of armed struggle (Resling, 2012) (in Hebrew).
- Students and Resistance In Palestine: Books, Guns, and Politics ISBN 978-1138802971 (Routledge, 2015)

In his first book, published in Hebrew, Zelkovitz argues that Fatah is not a secular political movement, but rather a traditional national liberation movement with religious background. Zelkovitz relates to the importance of Islam in the movement's political discourse and its cultural world.

In his second book, Zelkovitz explores the Palestinian Student Movement from an historical and sociological perspective. This book demonstrates how Palestinian national identity has been built in the absence of national institutions, whilst emphasizing the role of higher education as an agent of social change, capable of crystallizing patterns of national identity.

The book, was the first one that focuses on the political and social activities of Palestinian students in two arenas—the West Bank and Gaza Strip, and the Palestinian diaspora in the years 1952-2000. The book investigates the shared goal of the several movements in securing independence and the building a sovereign Palestinian state, comparing their development, social impact and the differing challenges each movement faced.

== Publicistic writing and activity ==
Zelkovitz writes publicistic and analyst columns and he is a commentator in the global media. He frequently appears as an analyst on Israeli TV news channels on issues related to the Israeli-Palestinian conflict. Zelkovitz is writing extensively and giving comments on the Palestinian Political system, with an emphasis on the complex relationship between Fatah and Hamas. Zelkovitz columns were translated into Arabic, published and cited in Leading Arabic, Palestinian, and Lebanese Media. Zelkoivtz writing was quoted by political officials in the Palestinian political system such as Izzat al-Rishq from Hamas.

== Selected articles ==
- Ido Zelkovitz, Militancy and Religiosity in the Service of National Aspiration: the Fatah Movement in its Formative years Israel Affairs, 21, 4, 2015, pp 668–690.
- Ido Zelkovitz, Education, revolution and evolution: the Palestinian universities as initiators of national struggle 1972–1995 History of Education, 43, 3, 2014, pp. 387–407
- Ido Zelkovitz, A Paradise lost? The Rise and fall of the Palestinian Community in Kuwait Middle Eastern Studies, 50, 1, winter 2014, pp. 86–99.
- Ido Zelkovitz, The Formation of Political Identity: Islam, Nationalism and Armed Struggle: the Fatah Movement 1959-1968, Hamizrah Ha-Hadash [the New East], 48, 2009, pp. 154–185. (in Hebrew).
- Ido Zelkovitz, Fatah's Embrace of Islamism, Middle East Quarterly, 15, 2, Spring 2008, pp. 19–26.
- Ido Zelkovitz, 'From the 'Land of Oranges' into 'Islamic Wakf': Islamic Elements in the Service of the Fatah Movement since the Outbreak of the al-Aqsa Intifada, East Wind, 4, summer 2006, pp. 64-68.
- Ido Zelkovitz, To Flourish the Desert: the role of the Palestinians in the Kuwaiti State Building Process in, Soli Shahvar, Eran Segal (eds), The Persian Gulf: New Trends in Interdisciplinary Research ("Ktav" Academic Publisher, 2014), pp. 245–260. (in Hebrew).
- Ido Zelkovitz, The Palestinian Reconciliation Process: a Post Arab Spring View, in: Mohammed Amman (ed), Middle East in Transition: New Directions, Old Aspirations (Washington DC: Westphalia Press, 2014), pp. 21–31.
- Ido Zelkovitz, Thinking about Palestine: Pillars of Palestinian Proto - Nationalism in the Late Ottoman Period, In Mohammed Amman (Ed), The Middle East: New Order or Disorder? (Washington DC: Policy Studies Organization/Westphalia Press, 2016), pp. 365–388.
