= PATH Biobank =

German biobank

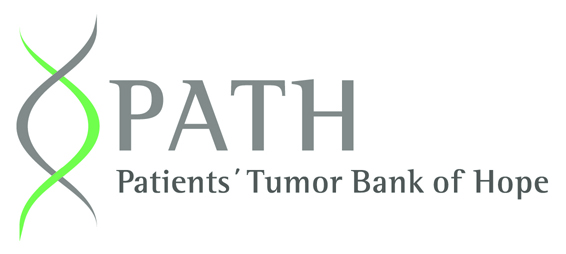

PATH Biobank (Patients' Tumor Bank of Hope) is a German biobank for breast cancer, established in 2002 from patients for patients. PATH is an independent non-profit foundation with the purpose of supporting breast cancer research with high quality tumor tissue. In order to achieve this goal, PATH operates sample storage tanks with liquid nitrogen at seven German breast centers. Tumor tissue and blood serum from breast cancer patients are stored in these tanks. More than 7200 women have consented to the storage of their tissue since 2004 (as of January 2014). A centralized database complements the biobank with important patient information. PATH is a joint venture of clinicians, scientists and patients. Via sample collection for cancer research, these partners aim to close the gap between basic science and fast implementation in the clinical practice.

== Concept ==
=== Making sample collection more efficient ===
Establishing the infrastructure for sampling high quality tissue for basic and clinical research is time consuming and hence often impossible. The property situation of the tumor tissue is often not clearly regulated, which further complicates the establishment of a tissue collection. This situation was pointed out by Prof. Dr. Axel Ullrich one of the inventors of Trastuzumab and members of the scientific advisory board of PATH. Gathering follow-up data from patients is often impossible for a scientist. PATH solves these problems via centralized storage of the samples, transparent allocation criteria and routine follow-up surveys.

=== Strategy ===
In one of the cooperating clinical centers, the breast cancer patient is informed about the option to store her tissue a blood serum at PATH. In the case of her informed consent, the tumor will be split into equal parts (aliquots) immediately after the surgery and routine diagnostic. One part is stored exclusively for the patient, the other samples are donated to PATH Biobank for research purposes. The samples are processed according to strict quality standards (cGCP) in all cooperating clinics and stored in the gas phase of liquid nitrogen (about -160 °C).

=== Standardized and uniform sample processing ===
The processing, labelling and storage of the tumor and normal tissue and the blood serum aliquots is performed according to standard operation procedures (SOPs), which have been developed specially for PATH. The size of the tissue samples and maximal ischemia times, as well as clotting times for the blood samples, are regulated by the SOPs and documented.

== Structure ==
The honorary board of the PATH Biobank consists of three individuals, according to the statute two of which need to have had breast cancer. In addition to the representation, e.g. at conferences and towards scientific partners, the board guides the activities and direction. The day-to-day business is organized by the PATH-office in Munich. The staff encompasses two permanent employees, which are supported by working students.

== Documentation of patient data ==
The PATH database encompasses a large amount of important information, which is crucial for using the samples for research. The database solution is located on a stand-alone-computer without internet access, in order to protect the data from unauthorized access. In addition to this, personal data are stored physically separated from further data. Under no circumstances are these personal data given to third parties. The database includes information about e.g. the number of samples, ischemia/clotting times of the samples before freezing, age and gender of the patient, potential pre-existing medical conditions, type and date of diagnosis, menopausal state, staging/grading, histopathology, receptor state (HER2/neu, ER- and PR-state), recommended therapies and already performed (neoadjuvant) therapies, survival state, events (locoregional relapse, distant metastases, therapy course).

== Cooperating clinics ==
(as of January 2014)

Bonn: Evangelische Kliniken Bonn gGmbH, Johanniter-Krankenhaus; Universitäts-Frauenklinik Bonn

Dortmund: St. Johannes-Hospital Dortmund, Brustzentrum

Bochum/Herne: Universitäts-Frauenklinik Marienhospital Herne, Kooperatives Brustzentrum Bochum/Herne; St. Annahospital, Kooperatives Brustzentrum Bochum/Herne

Kassel: Klinikum Kassel GmbH, IBZ- Interdisziplinäres Brustzentrum

Marburg: Klinik für Gynäkologie, gynäkologische Endokrinologie und Onkologie, Universitätsklinikum Gießen und Marburg GmbH, Standort Marburg, Brustzentrum Regio

Offenbach: Klinik für Gynäkologie und Geburtshilfe, Klinikum Offenbach GmbH

Regensburg: Klinik für Frauenheilkunde und Geburtshilfe der Universität Regensburg am Caritas-Krankenhaus St. Josef

== Sample allocation ==
Scientists from academic groups and from industry can apply for sample allocation.

== National and international biobank initiatives ==
In order to make biobanks more visible in Germany, the German biobank register was established, which is operated by the TMF – Technologie- und Methodenplattform für die vernetzte medizinische Forschung and supported by the German Ministry for Education and Research, the Bundesministerium für Bildung und Forschung. PATH Biobank is registered in the biobank register. The importance of biobanks such as PATH Biobank is also stressed by the initiative "Nationale Biobanken Initiative", which is supported with 18 Mio. Euro by the German Ministry for Education and Research.
