= Yehuda Patt =

- יהודה פת
- Education: Hebrew University and Hadassah Medical School, Jerusalem, Israel
- Occupations: liver cancer specialist, gastrointestinal oncologist
- Spouse: Nurit Patt (psychiatrist)

Yehuda Patt (Hebrew: יהודה פת) is a liver cancer specialist, gastrointestinal oncologist, and Professor of Medicine at the University of New Mexico, and resides in Santa Fe, New Mexico. He was previously at the University of Texas, MD Anderson Cancer Center in Houston between the years 1975-2003. He is the author of various papers pertaining to cancer and their effects on people and has been cited numerous times for his writings and analyses.

Patt is currently the director of Gastrointestinal Oncology Research at the University of New Mexico, as well as a professor in the Department of Internal Medicine, Division of Hematology/Oncology.

== Notable works ==
- Gastrointestinal Cancer - Phase II Trial of Systemic Continuous Fluorouracil and Subcutaneous Recombinant Interferon Alfa-2b for Treatment of Hepatocellular Carcinoma, February 2003
- Hepatic arterial infusion of floxuridine, leucovorin, doxorubicin, and cisplatin for hepatocellular carcinoma: effects of hepatitis B and C viral infection on drug toxicity and patient survival, June 1994
- Regional hepatic arterial chemotherapy for colorectal cancer metastatic to the liver: the controversy continues., May 1993
