= Soma Mukhopadhyay =

Indian creator of the rapid prompting method

Soma Mukhopadhyay is credited with creating rapid prompting method (though others have developed similar techniques, known as informative pointing or alphabet therapy), a pseudoscientific technique that attempts to aid people with autism or other disabilities to communicate through pointing, typing, or writing. It is also known as RPM and Spelling to Communicate.

Mukhopadhyay's use of RPM with her autistic son Tito Mukhopadhyay garnered media attention in America in the late 1990s and early 2000s.

== Career ==
Mukhopadhyay came to the United States in 2001. In 2003, Mukhopadhyay gained recognition when featured on the popular news program 60 Minutes. She joined Helping Autism through Learning and Outreach (HALO) in Texas in 2005. She also hosts workshops involving RPM worldwide.

== Criticism ==
RPM is closely related to the scientifically discredited technique facilitated communication (FC). Practitioners of RPM have failed to assess the issue of message agency using simple and direct scientific methodologies, saying that doing so would be stigmatizing and that allowing scientific criticisms of the technique robs people with autism of their right to communicate. The American Speech-Language-Hearing Association has issued a statement opposing the practice of RPM.

It has been noted that when using RPM Mukhopadhyay gives a high rate of verbal, gestural, and physical prompts even to the most independent students, and uses circular logic to explain why she claims RPM is legitimate. Mukhopadhyay has also acknowledged that a teacher who wants to move quickly could accidentally guide the student's arm through touch, although that is not allowed in RPM.

== Recognition ==
The release of the BBC documentary Tito's Story led to a fellowship offer from the Cure Autism Now foundation to Mukhopadhyay.

== Publications ==
- Mukhopadhyay, Soma (2008). Understanding Autism Through Rapid Prompting Method. Outskirts Press. ISBN 978-1-4327-2928-8.
- Mukhopadhyay, Soma (2011). Curriculum Guide for Autism Using Rapid Prompting Method: With Lesson Plan Suggestions. Outskirts Press. ISBN 978-1-4327-7461-5.
- Mukhopadhyay, Soma (2013). Developing Communication for Autism Using Rapid Prompting Method: Guide for Effective Language (First ed.). Outskirts Press. ISBN 978-1-4787-1313-5.
- Mukhopadhyay, Soma (2018). Growing Sensory Tolerance Using Rapid Prompting Method. Outskirts Press. ISBN 978-1-9772-0364-9.
- Mukhopadhyay, Soma (2014). Developing Motor Skills for Autism Using Rapid Prompting Method: Steps to Improving Motor Function. Outskirts Press. ISBN 978-1-4787-2841-2.
- Mukhopadhyay, Soma (2016). Developing Expressive Language in Verbal Students With Autism Using Rapid Prompting Method. Outskirts Press. ISBN 978-1-4787-7119-7.
- Mukhopadhyay, Soma (2015). Harnessing Stims and Behaviors in Autism Using Rapid Prompting Method. Outskirts Press. ISBN 978-1-4787-5427-5.
- Mukhopadhyay, Soma (2016). Mathematical Concepts For Autism Using Rapid Prompting Method. Outskirts Press. ISBN 978-1-4787-7954-4.
- Mukhopadhyay, Soma (2017). Developing the Visual Skill of Reading using Rapid Prompting Method.
- Mukhopadhyay, Soma (2017). Learning Life Skills Using Rapid Prompting Method - Part 1.
