= Iwate Medical University =

Coordinates: 39°42′19.6″N 141°9′2.4″E

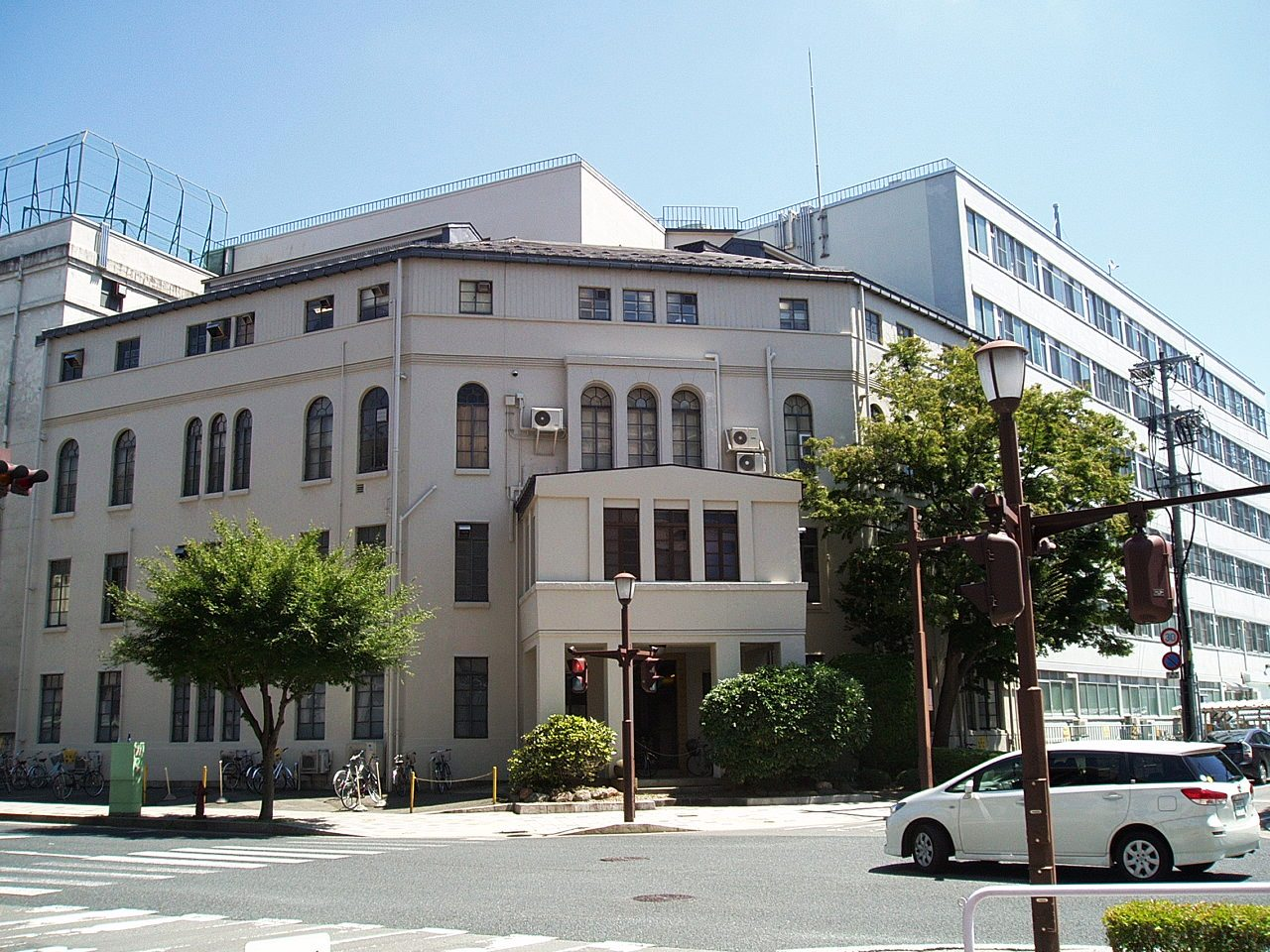
Uchimaru Campus (Morioka)

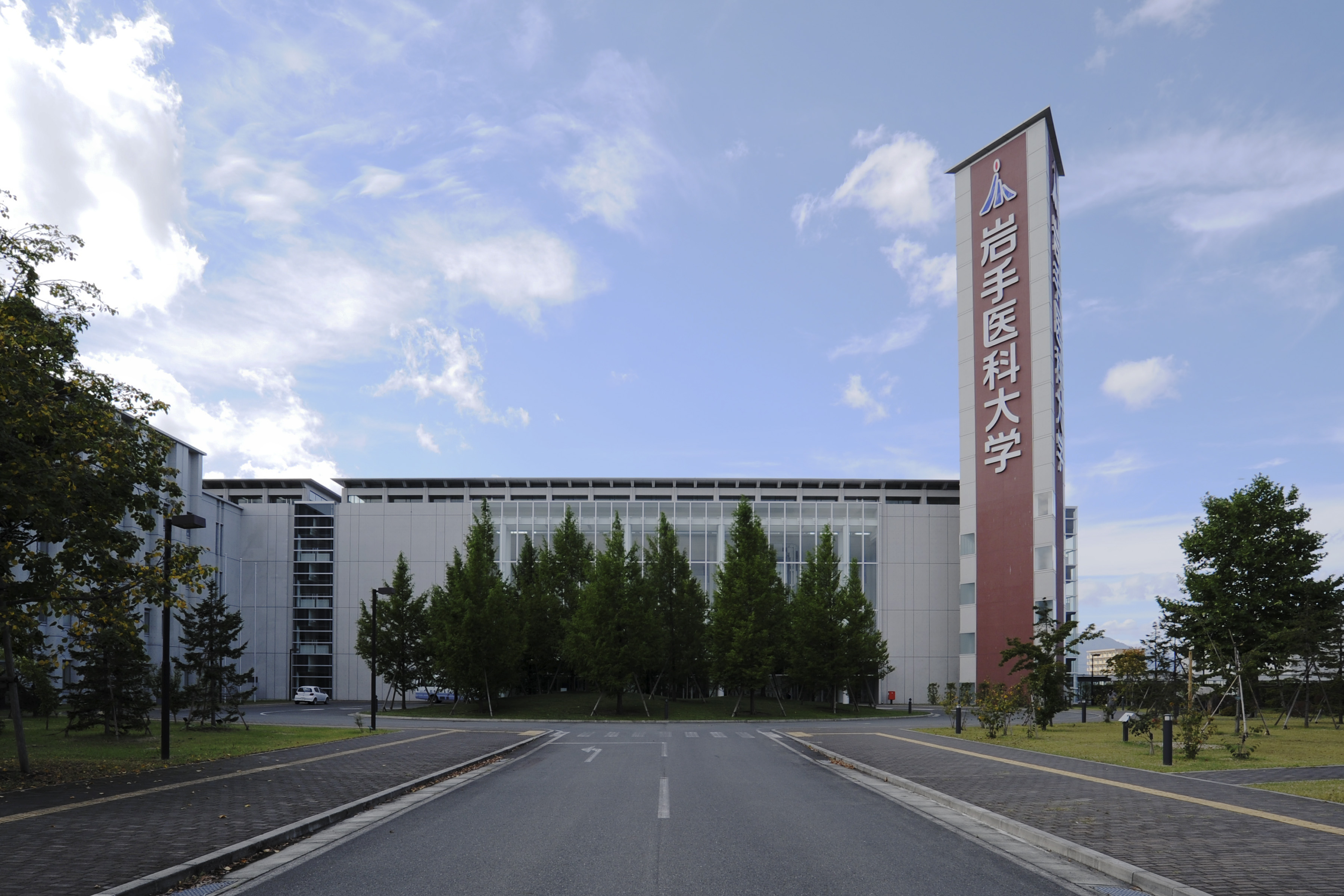
Yahaba Campus

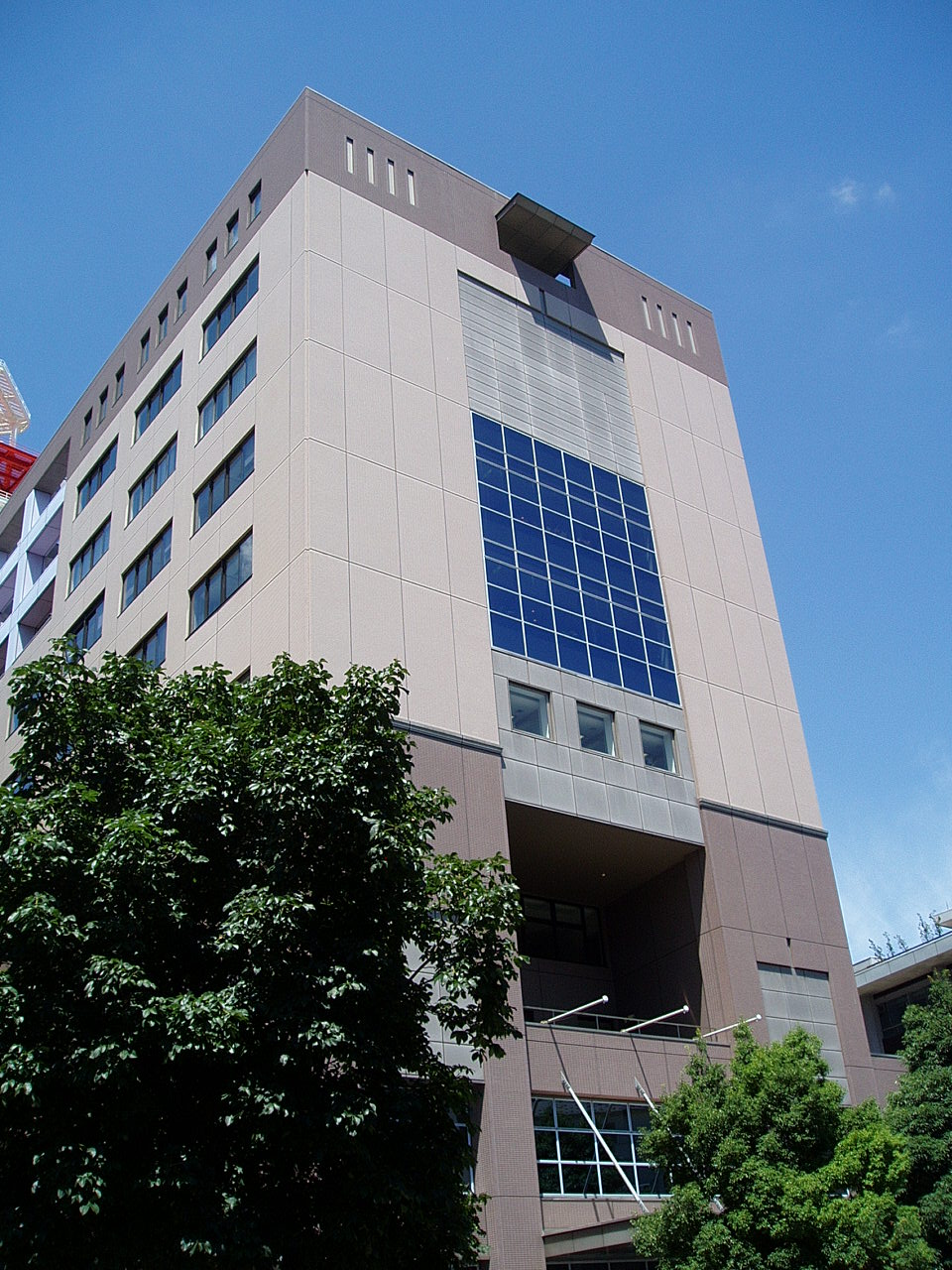
University Hospital (Memorial Heart Center) in Uchimaru

Iwate Medical University (岩手医科大学, Iwate ika daigaku) is a private university in Morioka, Iwate, Japan.

== History ==
The institution has its origins in a private medical school founded in 1901. The school was closed in 1912 and later re-established in 1928 as Iwate Medical College. In 1947 the college was reorganized into Iwate Medical University through Japanese education reform.

== Location ==
The university is in the centre of Morioka City, the capital of Iwate Prefecture. In recent years the university has built a new campus in small town of Yahaba, some 10 km from the old campus. The new School of Pharmacy was opened at this new campus, and it is expected that the entire university will move to the new campus in the near future.

== Facilities and education ==
As its name suggests, Iwate Medical University specializes in health sciences. As of April 2008 the university comprised three schools: School of Medicine, School of Dentistry, and School of Pharmacy (the latter is the latest addition). All instruction is conducted in Japanese.

The university runs a major teaching hospital which provides primary, secondary and tertiary health care for residents of Morioka city and the whole of Iwate prefecture. Although the university is relatively small and nowhere near the famous imperial colleges like Tokyo and Kyoto universities, it is well known in the eastern side of Japan for the competency of its graduates.

According to the Japanese Students Services Organization (JASSO), there were only two foreign students at the beginning of the academic year 2008, both at the graduate level. The first foreign doctoral (PhD) student to graduate from IMU was Denis Russa, a Monbukagakusho scholar from Tanzania who graduated in spring 2009. The number of foreign postdoctoral students joining the university has increased steadily over the years and it is hoped that doctoral students will increase likewise.
