= Autism in France =

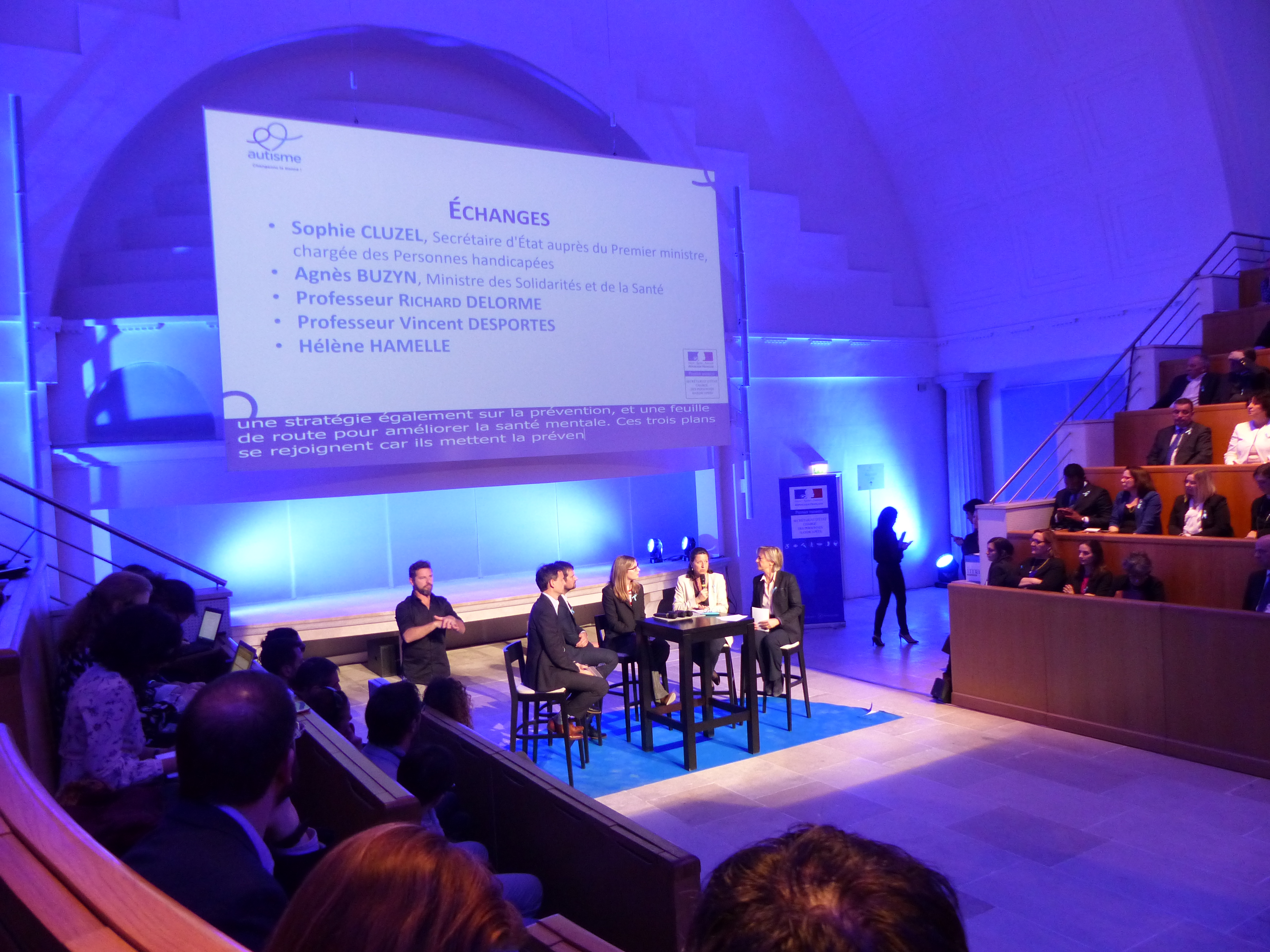
Launch of autism strategy in 2018.

The history of autism in France has been shaped by the influence of psychoanalysis and institutionalization practices that have often violated the rights of autistic individuals. As of 2016, it was estimated that 0.7 to 1% of the French population has an autism spectrum disorder, with many cases undiagnosed, leading to varying degrees of disability.

Before medical and intervention efforts, autistic individuals were often marginalized and subjected to mistreatment. The first steps toward addressing autism in France began in the 1950s, with Professor Roger Misès establishing day hospitals and creating the French classification of mental disorders in children. Interest in autism increased after the publication of Bruno Bettelheim's The Empty Fortress (1967). In the 1990s, the government, under Simone Veil, began to take action, and by the early 2000s, parents' associations began challenging the psychiatric approach that viewed autism as a mental illness tied to poor parenting. These efforts led to autism being recognized as a disability and the introduction of new policies, including four "Autism Plans" in the 2000s. These plans aimed to improve school enrollment and employment opportunities for autistic individuals, and autism is now recognized as a spectrum disorder.

The treatment of autism in France has been marked by debates over intervention methods. These debates often center on differing views between supporters of behavioral approaches and those who maintain psychoanalytic perspectives. Additionally, specific practices, such as using the term "autistic" as an insult and the overmedication of individuals with neuroleptics, have been sources of social exclusion and suffering. Recent research advocates for focusing on the unique interests of people with autism to foster a more inclusive society.

== Descriptions and statistics ==
According to sociologist Lise Demailly, autism in France is marked by intense debates and conflicts, often leading to legal disputes. She highlights the range of ideological, ethical, and practical disagreements surrounding the issue.

The field of autism in France is characterized by a variety of approaches, influenced by psychoanalysis. However, in places like Quebec, where psychoanalysis is not used, parents also express dissatisfaction with the services available. The scientific discourse on autism is now global, with much of the research coming from neurobiologists and geneticists, often in English.

While French psychiatrists and psychoanalysts face growing criticism and diminishing influence with public authorities, they continue to produce intellectual work outside mainstream scientific journals. Demailly notes that there is no single, widely accepted scientific definition of autism or understanding of its causes. Despite this, there is general agreement on the description of autism symptoms, though tensions persist. The representation of autistic people in France remains limited, with the neurodiversity movement arriving relatively late.

=== Descriptions ===
In France, autism is described as a lifelong neurodevelopmental disorder, with three main factors: genetics, brain development and behavior. It is characterized by communication difficulties, repetitive behaviors, strong resistance to change, and obsessive interests or activities. There may also be sensory sensitivities. Autistic individuals may experience additional conditions like epilepsy, hyperactivity, or sleep and eating disorders.

The French Ministry of Solidarity and Health has moved away from sub-categories of autism and now uses the term Autism Spectrum Disorder (ASD), which reflects the varying development of individuals within society.

According to Franck Ramus of the French National Centre for Scientific Research (CNRS), autism involves differences in three areas: social interaction, communication, and preferred interests or activities. These differences can lead to challenges in adapting to family and social life, causing difficulties for both the individuals and those around them.

Cognitive psychiatrist Laurent Mottron notes that while most autistic people struggle with societal adaptation, a small group, around 10%, can be verbal, relatively independent, and successful in adulthood. However, others may remain non-verbal or experience behaviors that are harder to manage.

=== Causes ===
The cause of autism is considered multifactorial, with a significant genetic component. Research has identified genetic mutations that affect communication between neurons. Claims that autism is caused by psychological factors, such as parental traits, or even gluten, vaccines, or mercury, are not supported by scientific evidence.

Some critics, like journalist Gerald Messadié, argue that psychoanalysis has contributed to the incorrect belief that autism is purely psychological. In France, the term "child psychosis" has often been linked to psychodynamic explanations of autism. However, many researchers and professionals, including psychiatrists and psychoanalysts, have suggested various psychological models to understand autism, though these views are not universally accepted.

=== Classification ===
The French Classification of Mental Disorders in Children and Adolescents (CFTMEA) includes subcategories for autism, such as deficit psychosis and psychotic dysharmonia, which are not found in international classifications like the ICD-10 and DSM-5. Other forms of autism, such as infantile autism and Asperger's syndrome, are recognized in both the CFTMEA and international classifications. The recognition of autism in France has been delayed by limited research and debates within the field.

Correspondence between ICD-10 and CFTMEA-R-2012 classifications
ICD-10 Pervasive developmental disorders	CFTMEA-R-2012 Pervasive developmental disorders – early psychoses
F84.0 Childhood autism	1.00 Early-onset autism, Kanner type
F84.1 Atypical autism	1.01 Other forms of autism
F84.1 + F70 to F79 Typical autism with mental delay	1.02 Autism or PDD with early mental retardation/deficit psychosis
F84.5 Asperger's syndrome	1.03 Asperger's syndrome
F 84.8 Pervasive developmental disorder not otherwise specified	1.04 Multiple and complex developmental disharmony / Psychotic disharmony

The use of the term "psychosis" to describe autism was criticized in the early 2000s. Some professionals, like Claude Wacjman, argue that the CFTMEA's use of "psychosis" helps align French practices with international systems, improving service coordination. However, other professionals, including Jean-Claude Maleval and Claude Wacjman, oppose broader international concepts of Autism Spectrum Disorder (ASD), seeing them as too inclusive or commercialized. Some experts, like Jacques Hochmann, suggest the term "autism spectrum" may eventually be replaced by "autism."

The classification of autism in France has been inconsistent, initially seen as a mental health condition and now classified as a disability. This has made it challenging to develop clear policies. Some critics, including Josef Schovanec, highlight the issues with classifying autistic individuals as mental health patients, leading to unwanted psychiatric treatments. Despite this, autism is officially recognized as a disability, with varying degrees of impact on an individual’s ability to function in society, from significant challenges to minimal limitations.

=== Epidemiology ===
Reference data were collected in 2010 by epidemiologist Éric Fombonne for the Haute Autorité de santé report on knowledge of autism:

Estimating the prevalence of pervasive developmental disorders
Source:	Fombonne, 1999	Inserm, 2002	Fombonne, 2003	Fombonne, 2005	Fombonne, 2009
Number of studies included in the review	23	31	32	40	43
PDD	18,7/10 000 (1/535)	27,3/10 000 (1/336)	27,5/10 000 (1/364)	37/10 000 (1/270)	63,7/10 000 (1/156)
Childhood autism	7,2/10 000 (1/1389)	9/10 000 (1/1111)	10/10 000 (1/1000)	13/10 000 (1/769)	20,6/10 000 (1/485)
Other childhood disintegrative disorder	–	–	0,2/10 000 (1/50000)	0,2/10 000 (1/50000)	0,2/10 000 (1/50000)
Asperger's syndrome	–	3/10 000 (1/3333)	2,5/10 000 (1/4000)	3/10 000 (1/3333)	6/10 000 (1/1667)
Atypical autism, Other PDDs	11,5/10 000 (1/870)	15,3/10 000 (1/654)	15/10 000 (1/666.7)	21/10 000 (1/476)	37,1/10 000 (1/270)

The prevalence of autism in France is estimated at around 1% of the population, or approximately 700,000 people, with 100,000 of them under 20 years old. The male-to-female ratio is about 4:1. Estimates vary, with some reports suggesting between 250,000 and 600,000 autistic individuals in the country. However, there is a significant under-diagnosis, and some studies show a lower prevalence in France compared to other countries.

The prevalence of autism in France has been debated, with estimates ranging from 4 to 5 per 10,000 births for typical autism, and 12 per 10,000 for all pervasive developmental disorders. The figures include various forms of autism, including atypical forms, deficit psychoses, and other related conditions. Some experts believe the increase in diagnoses may be due to improved detection rather than a true rise in cases.

Experts also note that the number of people with autism is difficult to determine, as many individuals remain undiagnosed. Some estimates suggest there are between 450,000 and 650,000 people with autism in France, based on international diagnostic criteria.

According to a survey of 900 French people with autism conducted by Doctissimo and the FondaMental Institute and published in March 2013, 55% of respondents have infantile autism, 23.5% have an unspecified pervasive developmental disorder and 16.6% have Asperger syndrome.

== History ==
France, along with Latin America, is one of the regions where psychoanalysts have historically included infantile autism in their explanations of the condition, especially after the 1970s and 1980s. Psychoanalytic practices continue to influence psychiatric approaches to autism in the country. The deinstitutionalization process in France started later than in other countries, with a high rate of institutionalization for children with autism compared to the rest of Europe. Additionally, there has been significant opposition between parent associations and health professionals regarding the treatment of autism.

In the 2010s, French parent associations, initially focused on securing institutional care and funding, began advocating for changes in the way autistic children were treated and educated. Sociologists note that these efforts were partly driven by public authorities to push forward deinstitutionalization, although this led to concerns among health professionals about the availability of resources for vulnerable families. Over the years, the classification of autism has evolved from being seen as a rare and severe disorder to a broader spectrum of related conditions, affecting around 1% of the population. Since the 1990s, autism has increasingly been viewed as a social issue, with significant legal developments, although resistance to change remains.

=== Before medical descriptions ===
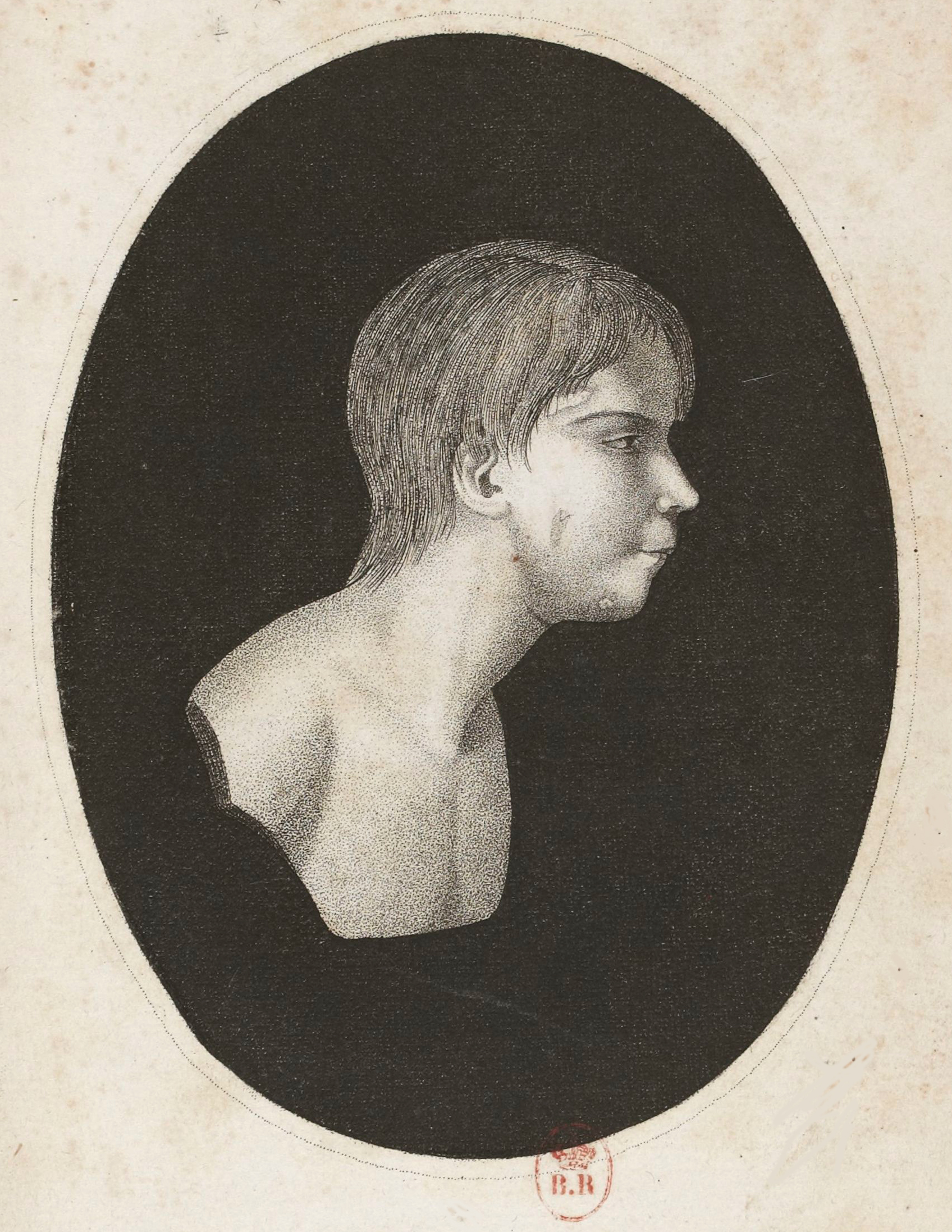
First portrait of Victor de l'Aveyron.

Before the concept of autism was defined, individuals with the condition were often marginalized and described as "idiots", "crazy" or "wild children." One example is Victor de l'Aveyron, a child found in 1801 who exhibited behaviors now associated with autism. Dr. Jean Itard, who cared for him, also described a form of non-verbal autism in 1828, calling it intellectual mutism. In the 19th and early 20th centuries, many medical professionals viewed these individuals as suffering from hereditary degeneration, influenced by eugenic theories. Itard and Édouard Séguin were among the first to study and describe individuals who may have had autism.

The first formal descriptions of autism and Asperger's syndrome appeared in the 1940s in international scientific literature. During the German occupation of France, autistic individuals were likely among those who died in psychiatric hospitals due to starvation and harsh conditions.

=== 1950s to 1980s ===
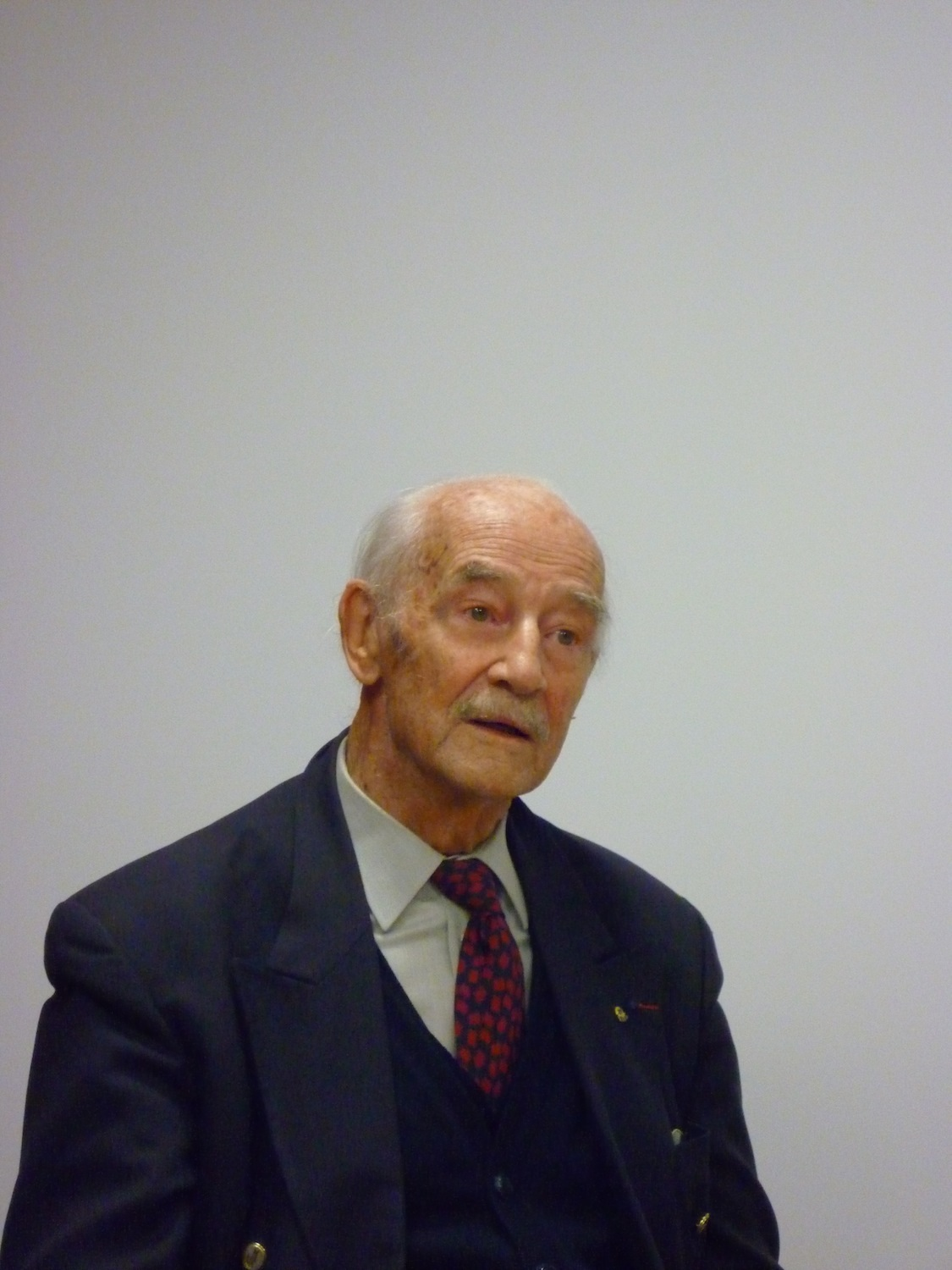
Gilbert Lelord (1927–2017), one of the pioneers of the study of autism in France.

Until the 1980s, autism in France was primarily understood as infantile autism, or Kanner autism, and was categorized with psychoses or schizophrenia. Additionally, until the 1990s, autism was rarely diagnosed, as it was believed that individuals could not be considered autistic if they spoke. The publication of The Empty Fortress in 1967 brought attention to autism and influenced public perception, particularly with the idea of the autistic child as a "machine child". The 1974 television program by Daniel Karlin and conferences by Bettelheim also popularized his views on autism, including the controversial "mother refrigerator" theory.

In France, autism was long equated with childhood schizophrenia, and it wasn't until the 1980s that the distinction between the two was made. The team at Tours hospital, led by psychiatrist Gilbert Lelord, neurologist Catherine Barthélémy, and child psychiatrist Dominique Sauvage, became pioneers in autism research and support. However, autism did not receive significant attention from French public authorities until the 1990s.

==== Implementation of sector policy ====
According to Jacques Hochmann, French psychoanalysts were among the first to approach autistic children with humanity. From the 1950s onward, inspired by practices in the United States and the United Kingdom, psychiatrists and psychoanalysts like Roger Misès and Serge Lebovici introduced care, education, and pedagogy for autistic children in France. These efforts led to the creation of part-time institutions, day hospitals, and outpatient care to support communication and social relationships. The creation of the Santos-Dumont day hospital in Paris in 1963, by the Association Serving Misfits with Personality Disorders (ASITP), marked a significant step in this approach. By the 1970s, these methods spread throughout France. French child psychiatry supported an environmental cause for autism, incorporating it into a broader multifactorial approach and developing care structures in line with a "sector" policy. These structures, meant for children with serious personality disorders, offered a combination of psychological, educational, pedagogical, and rehabilitative care.

However, depending on the severity of their disorders, individuals with autism were often referred to psychiatric hospitals or medical-social institutes. The approaches in these institutions were sometimes deemed insufficient due to limited resources and a focus on "care" over education. In 1989, the Creton amendment allowed disabled adults over 20 to remain in medico-social institutes, typically for those with high dependency or multiple disabilities.

==== First implementations of behavioral therapies ====
In the 1980s, French parents learned about behavioral therapies for autistic children from North America and sought to introduce them in France. This interest was driven by the guilt associated with psychoanalytic theories of autism and the desire to actively engage in their children's education. In 1989, psychiatrist Catherine Milcent translated Eric Schopler's work into French and established the first French class integrated with the TEACCH program in Meudon. In the 1990s, dedicated units for autistic individuals were created, offering behavioral programs like TEACCH and ABA. However, these programs were limited in number and faced skepticism from the medico-social sector. Despite this, the introduction of these programs led to a shift in how autism was approached, with health professionals adopting a more multidisciplinary approach and becoming more open to the Anglo-Saxon model.

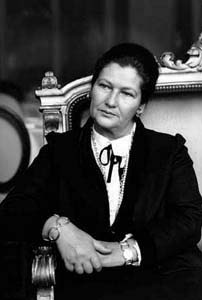
Simone Veil in 1993.

=== In the 1990s ===
In 1993, Simone Veil, newly appointed to the Ministry of Social Affairs, Health, and Urban Affairs, acknowledged significant challenges in supporting autistic individuals, following pressure from parents' associations. Three reports were published in 1994 and 1995 addressing these issues. At the time, autism was defined by the National Agency for the Development of Medical Evaluation (ANDEM) as involving delays or deviations in social interactions, verbal and non-verbal communication, and behaviors, often accompanied by fears, sleep and eating disorders, and aggression. In April 1995, the Veil circular was introduced, with a budget of 100 million francs over five years, but it was not implemented due to budget cuts. Between 1995 and 2000, four specialized centers and 2,000 childcare spaces were created, but the 1999 UNAPEI report deemed these measures insufficient, citing diagnostic errors and inadequate care facilities.

==== Opinion 47 of the National Ethics Advisory Committee ====
In 1995, disagreements between health professionals and parent associations intensified. The issue of social exclusion was raised before the Council of Europe, noting that only 3 to 7% of autistic individuals achieve independence as adults. The Autisme France association appealed to the National Consultative Ethics Committee (CCNE) in 1994, highlighting difficulties in early diagnosis, the use of outdated classifications, and psychoanalytically influenced treatments. The CCNE issued Opinion No. 47 in January 1996, which helped foster collaboration between parent associations and public authorities to improve autism care.

==== Chossy law and connection to the field of disability ====
The special education allowance (AES), established under the 1975 law for parents of disabled children, was initially not extended to parents of autistic children, as autism was considered a disease. On 11 December 1996, the "Chossy law" was passed, introduced by Jean-François Chossy, to ensure multidisciplinary interventions for autistic individuals and to officially recognize autism as a disability. This law, adopted unanimously, was the first in France aimed at supporting the rights of autistic people and helped reduce the stigma of considering autism a psychiatric illness.

=== From 2000 to 2005 ===
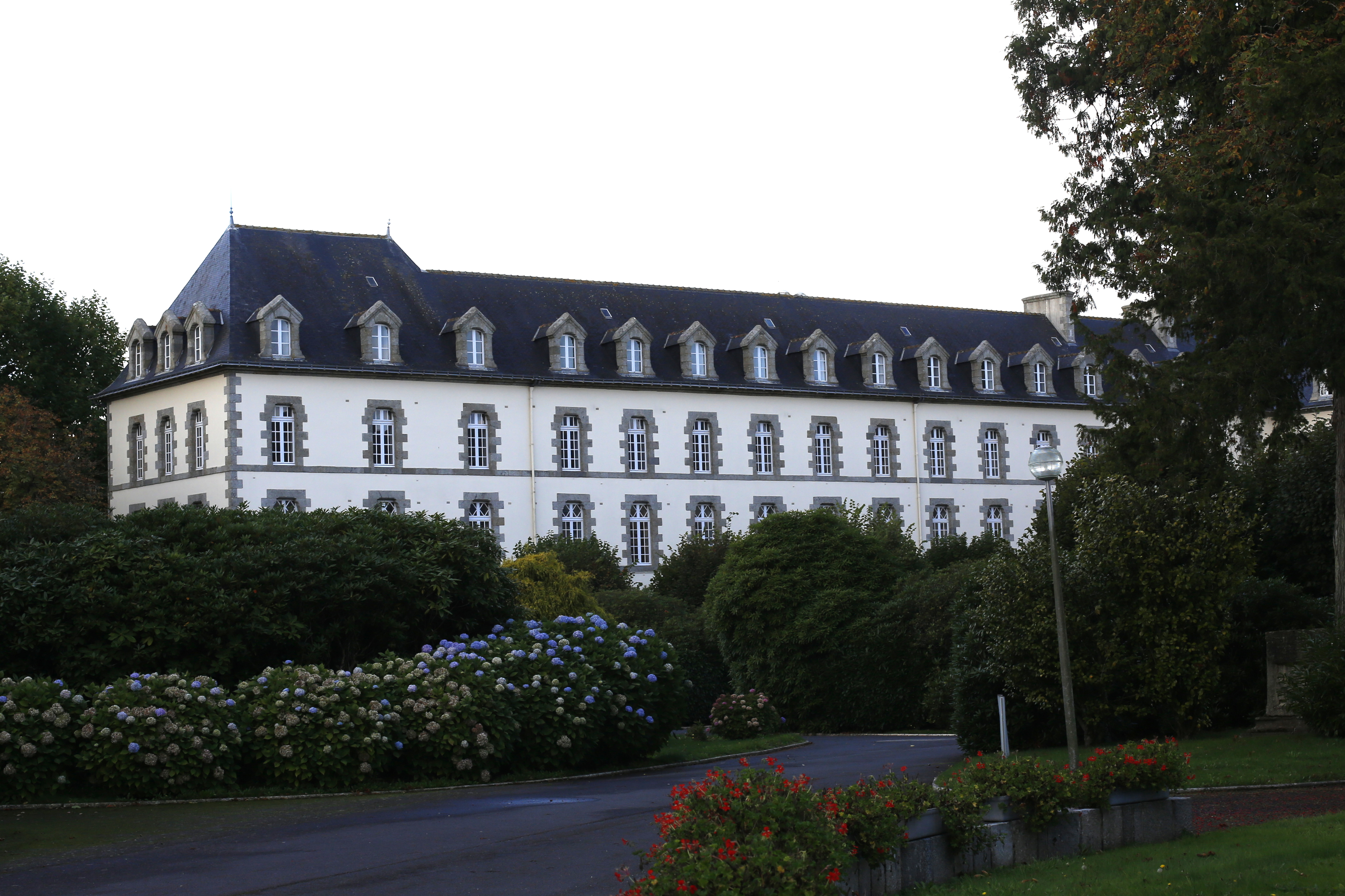
Psychiatric hospital in Plouguernével in Brittany.

In January 2000, a new funding allocation was approved to create more places for autistic people between 2001 and 2003. During this period, many French families moved to Wallonia, Belgium, due to the availability of educational centers, while others sought training in countries that offered behavioral methods to improve their children's future prospects.

In 2000, the concept of pervasive developmental disorder and Asperger syndrome was introduced into the French classification of autism. This change was met with resistance from many French psychiatrists, who still viewed autism as a rare and severe condition.

The 2002 law on user representation aimed to encourage the participation of autistic individuals in public decision-making about their care.

==== Report by Jean-François Chossy in 2003 ====
In October 2003, Jean-François Chossy submitted a report on the situation of autistic people in France, highlighting insufficient support for many individuals. The report called for a comprehensive plan to address early diagnosis, research, lifelong support, training for professionals, and better integration in society. It rejected the divide between "psychodynamic" and "educational" approaches, advocating for care that meets individual needs with a multi-year plan and adequate financial support. The report was strongly influenced by the positions of Autism France.

==== Recommendations of 2004 and first conviction ====
In 2003, lawyer Évelyne Friedel, then president of Autism France, brought the issue of lack of education access for autistic children to the Court of Justice of the European Union. The court ruled in November 2003 that this was a violation, leading to France’s first European conviction for discrimination in 2004. The Autism Europe Association supported the case, noting not only the lack of educational access but also the limited availability of specialized education and a narrower definition of autism than the World Health Organization's.

In 2004, the French Federation of Psychiatry and the High Authority for Health developed recommendations for early diagnosis. Following the European ruling, France introduced four successive autism plans between 2005 and 2022 (2005–2007, 2008–2010, 2013–2017, and 2018–2022) to address the growing number of diagnoses and the general lack of awareness among both the public and medical professionals.

==== Disability Act of 2005 ====
The 2005 Disability Act aimed to ensure equal rights and opportunities for people with autism, marking France's first major step toward securing the schooling of children with autism. However, some critics, like Claude Wacjman, argued that the law’s definition of psychological disability may reinforce stigma by implying that there is no hope for improvement. On the other hand, Marcel Hérault, president of Sésame Autisme, supported linking autism to the field of disability, viewing it as a condition affecting individuals at a given moment, while also acknowledging the role of psychiatry in autism care.

=== First Autism Plan (2005–2007) ===
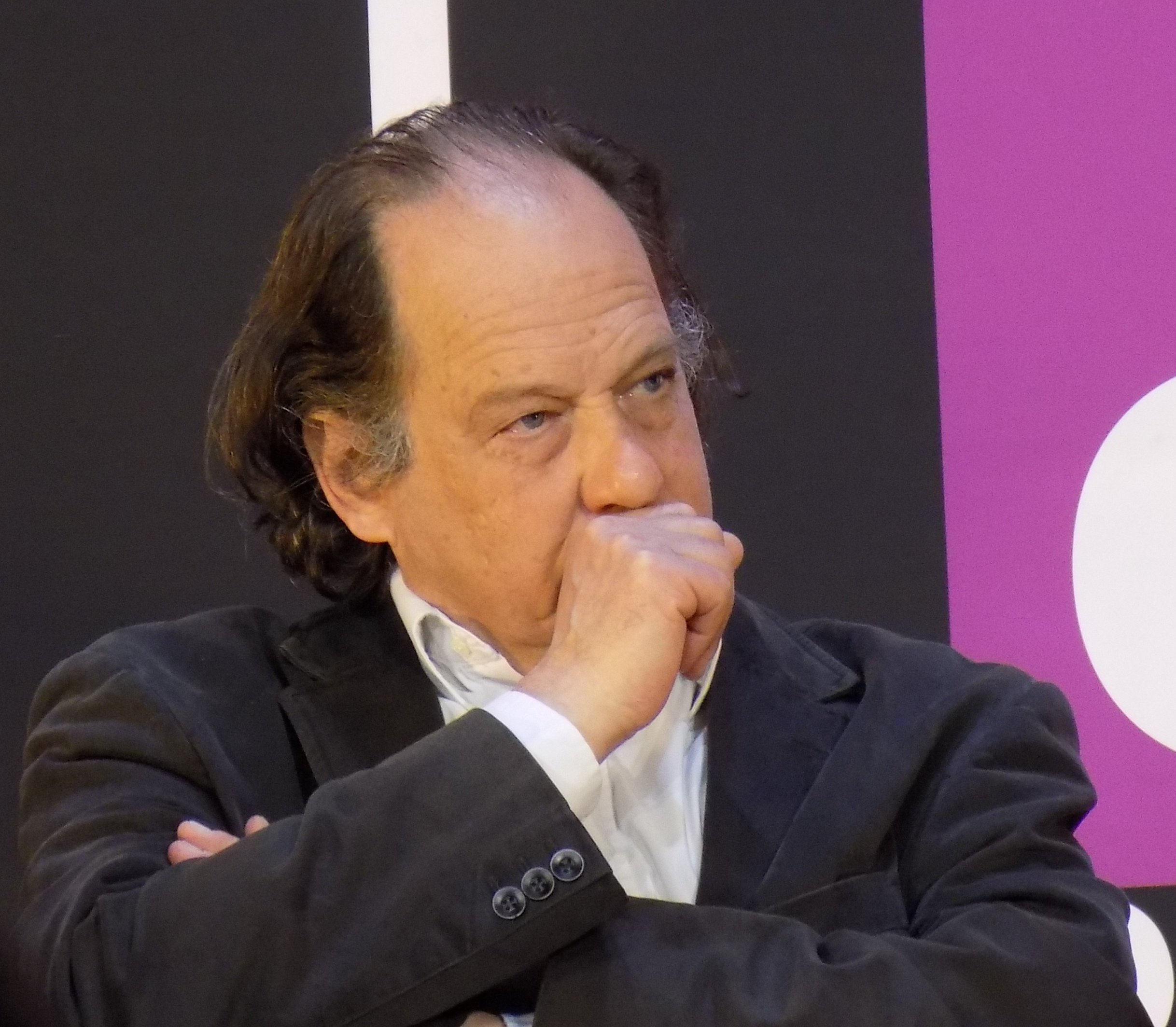
Jean Claude Ameisen, rapporteur for Opinion No.102 of the French National Consultative Ethics Committee, in 2015

As a result of the first European condemnation of France, the first Autism Plan was introduced in 2005. It led to the creation of Autism Resource Centers (CRA) in each French region and focused on improving professional training and increasing the availability of specialized care. The plan also recommended more inclusive schooling for autistic children, with better support for parents, families, and teachers.

In November 2007, the Comité Consultatif National d'Éthique (CCNE) issued a critical report based on feedback from five parent associations. The report highlighted the lack of support for autistic individuals and the distress faced by families.

It criticized the absence of early diagnosis, mainstream schooling, and socialization, which it claimed led to missed opportunities for children and neglect. The CCNE called for earlier diagnoses, individualized education, and access to effective educational methods, such as cognitive-behavioral programs. It also recommended the use of medication for severe symptoms and psychological support for families. The CCNE report criticized the harmful impact of the "refrigerator mothers" theory and called for more reliable, early diagnoses and better educational support for children. The report also acknowledged the emerging role of psychoanalysts in multidisciplinary care, though it emphasized the need for approaches based on educational methods.

The CCNE's views on psychoanalysis were met with criticism from some professionals, including psychoanalyst Boris Chaffel and child psychiatrist Anne-Sylvie Pelloux, who argued that the report oversimplified the history of psychoanalytic theories and overlooked valuable work in the field.

=== Second Autism Plan (2008–2010) ===
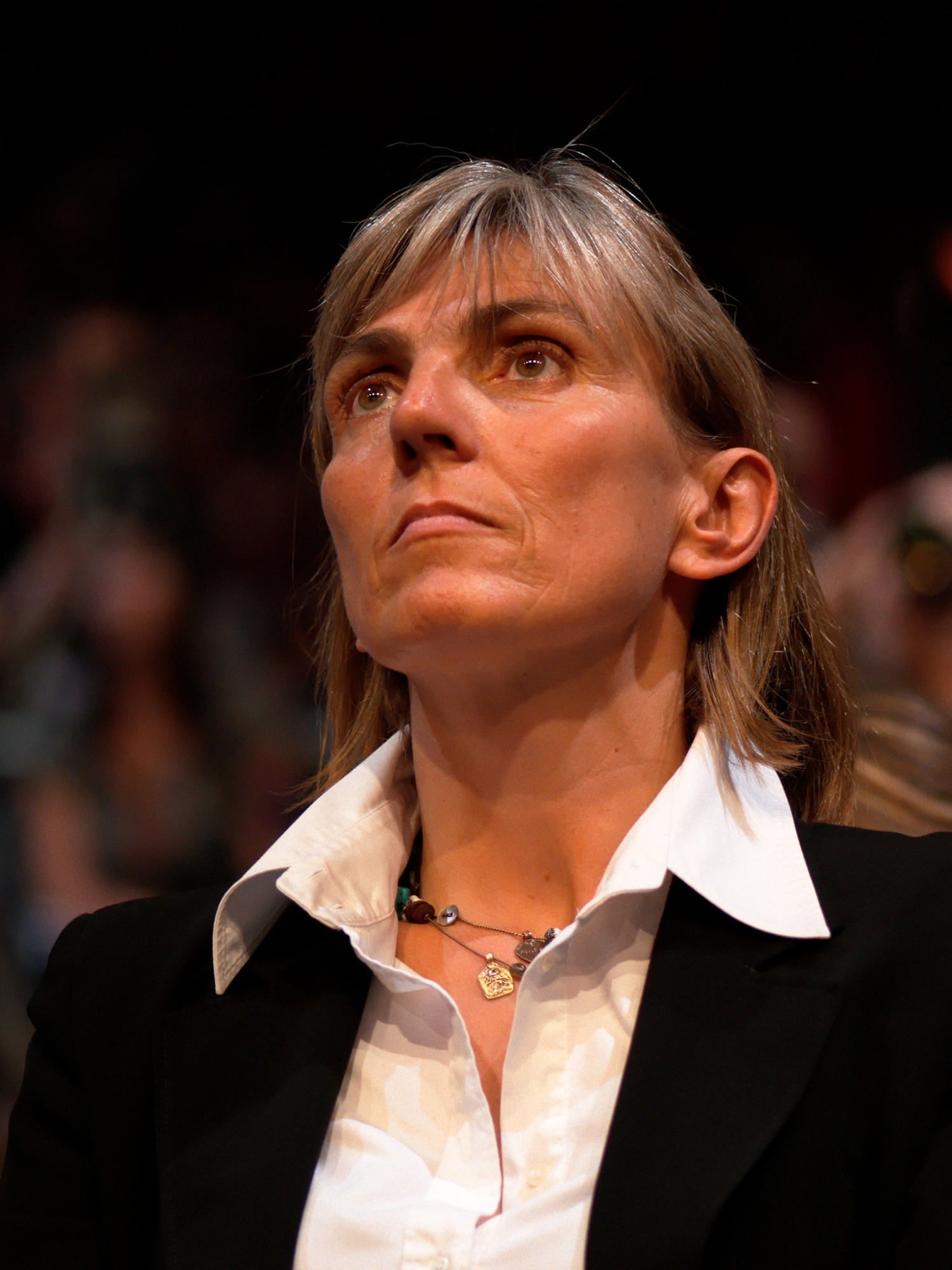
Valérie Létard, initiator of the second Autism Plan, in 2007.

The second Autism Plan was launched in May 2008 by Valérie Létard. Over two years, the plan aimed to create 4,100 spaces in institutions for autistic children and adults. The High Authority for Health was tasked with developing a scientific and multidisciplinary knowledge base on autism, while the National Agency for the Evaluation and Quality of Establishments and Social and Medico-Social Services (Anesm) was responsible for defining best practices. This base was published in January 2010.

The plan also financed seven experimental intervention projects and aimed to improve access to diagnosis and support. In February 2010, the Committee of Ministers adopted a recommendation on the deinstitutionalization of disabled children, emphasizing the importance of respecting children's rights. At the end of 2011, Valérie Létard reported that while some objectives were not fully met, 70% of the planned spaces had been created, and 25,000 autistic children were enrolled in school.

=== Year of Great National Cause (2012) ===
In 2012, autism was declared an important national priority under Prime Minister François Fillon. The year saw various awareness campaigns and media coverage, particularly following the release of the documentary Le Mur. In January, MP Daniel Fasquelle proposed a law aimed at ending psychoanalytic practices in autism treatment, promoting the use of educational and behavioral methods, and reallocating funding for these approaches.

In March, the High Authority for Health recommended certain educational and behavioral approaches, such as the ABA method, Early Start Denver Model, and the TEACCH program, noting their effectiveness in improving IQ, communication skills, and language development in about 50% of children. The report did not recommend certain methods like the Son-Rise program, the 3i method, and others, and excluded psychoanalysis and institutional psychotherapy, citing a lack of evidence for their effectiveness. It also opposed practices like "packing" except in research contexts.

The report sparked controversy, with proponents of cognitive-behavioral therapies calling for the ban of psychoanalysis, while psychoanalysts criticized the methodology and argued that the report failed to capture the complexity of autism. Some medical professionals expressed concerns about the approach used to develop the recommendations, claiming that the focus on cognitive-behavioral methods was not well-supported and did not provide enough guidance for families and healthcare providers.

=== Third Autism Plan (2013–2017) ===
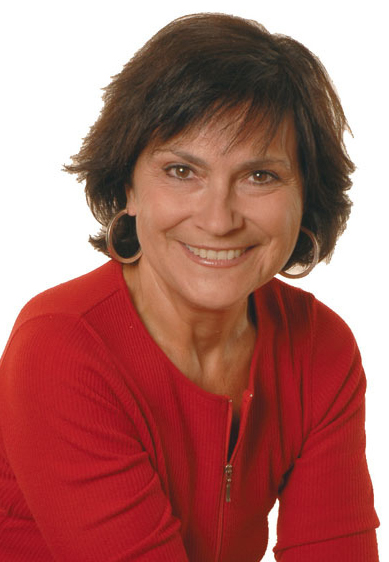
Marie-Arlette Carlotti, initiator of the third Autism Plan, in 2012.

The third Autism Plan, announced on 2 May 2013 by Marie-Arlette Carlotti, included measures to improve early diagnosis, support for families, and the creation of 700 specialized teaching places in nursery schools to help autistic children integrate into primary schools. The plan, with a budget of 205 million euros, focused on early diagnosis, childhood support, family assistance, research, and training for professionals. An official website was launched to provide reliable information.

==== Political positions ====
In February 2014, the Council of Europe concluded that the rights of autistic children to schooling and professional training were not being fully respected in France. The report also noted that specialized institutions lacked an educational focus.

In 2016, Ségolène Neuville recommended educational methods for autism and opposed blaming mothers. Later that year, Daniel Fasquelle proposed a resolution to promote care based on official recommendations, but it was rejected.

==== Assessment of the third plan ====
By 2014-2015, the number of autistic children in school increased to 26,347 from 23,545 the previous year. However, a report from the General Inspectorate highlighted weaknesses in epidemiology, involvement of health professionals, and regional managements. Despite progress in school integration and screening, the support available, particularly for adults, remained insufficient.

=== Fourth Autism Plan (2018–2022) ===
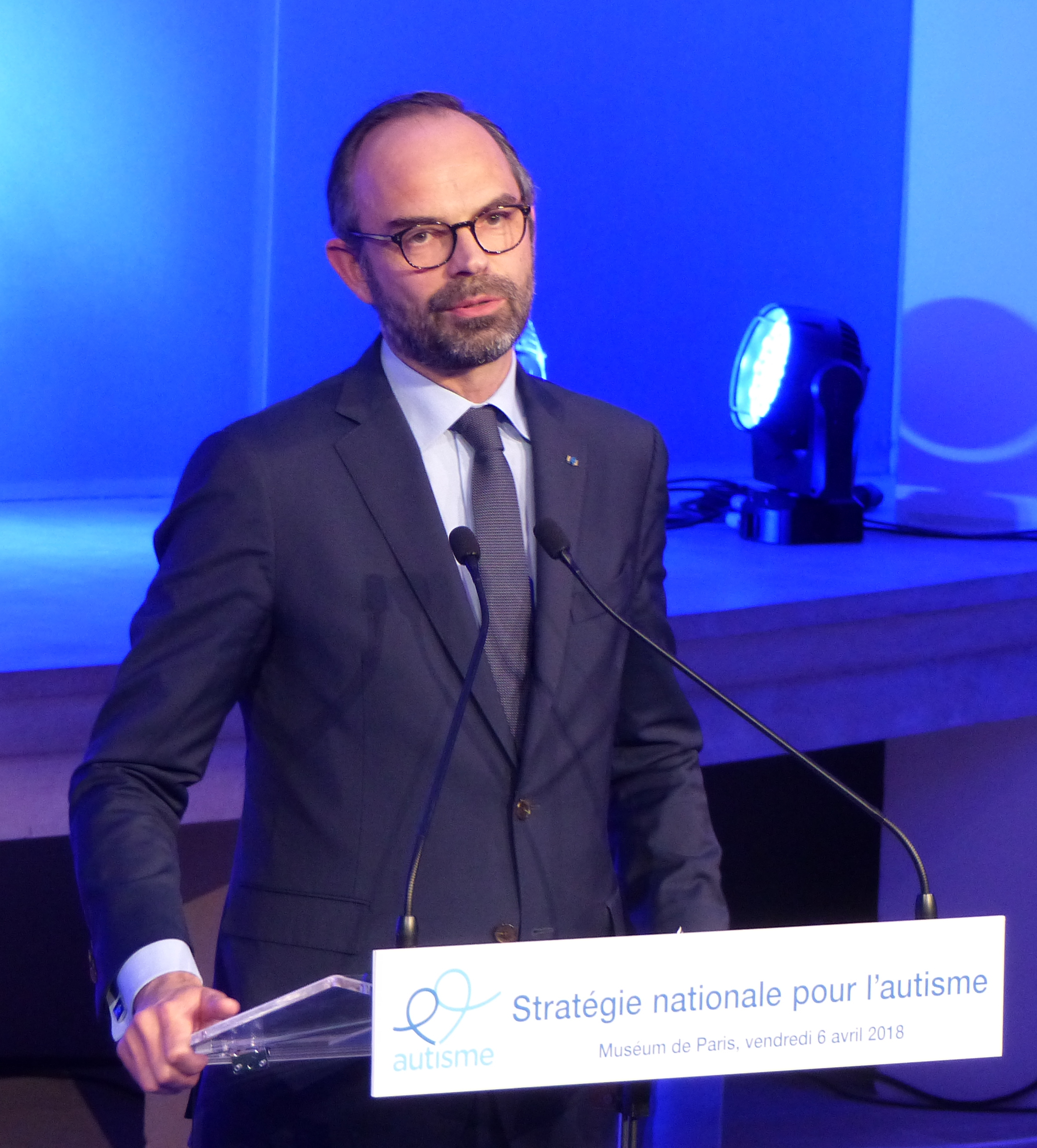
Édouard Philippe, Prime Minister of France, during the launch of the 4th autism plan (or autism strategy) on 6 April 2018.

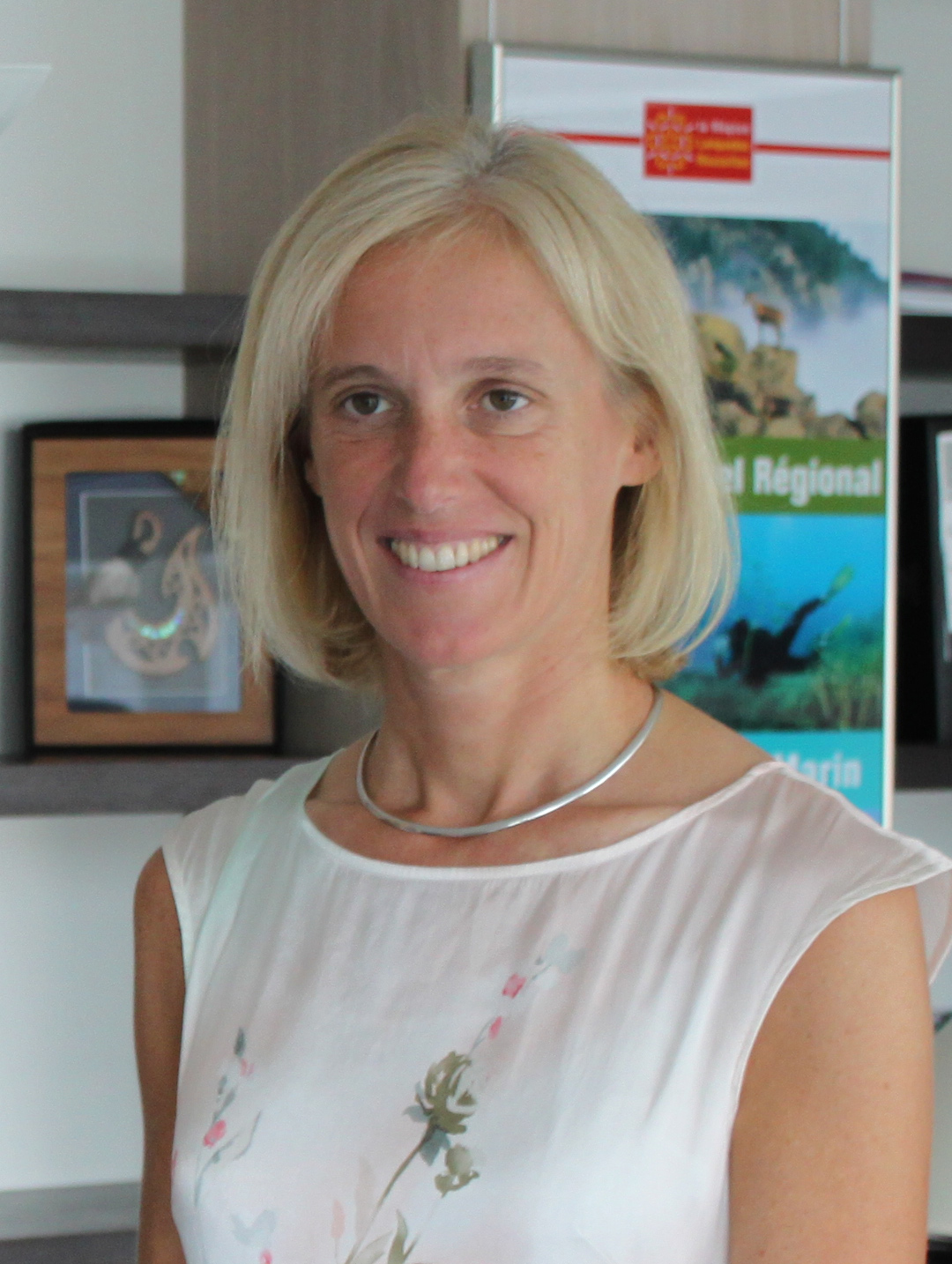
Ségolène Neuville, Secretary of State responsible for disabled people and the fight against exclusion

During the 2016 national disability conference, François Hollande announced the preparation of the fourth Autism Plan, set to run from 2018 to 2022. Josef Schovanec was tasked with developing a plan focused on the training, integration, and professional activity of autistic adults. The report, submitted in March 2017, recommended reviewing budgets to improve care. In 2017, a commission of international scientists was assembled to define good intervention practices. The fourth plan, called the "autism strategy," included autism within broader disability policies and emphasized better access to medical and educational services. Recommendations for adults were published by the High Authority for Health (HAS) in June 2017. The consultation was officially launched on 6 July 2017, with President Emmanuel Macron delivering a speech.

On 1 January 2019, a key measure of the plan, the early intervention package, was implemented. In February 2019, the UN released a report on disability in France, highlighting issues such as institutionalization, under-representation of autistic individuals in decision-making, and violations of their human rights.

== Diagnostic ==
At the start of the 21st century, France began aligning more with international classifications of autism spectrum disorders (DSM-5 and ICD-10), broadening the definition of autism, which was previously referred to by terms like "child psychoses" and Asperger's syndrome. While efforts to improve diagnosis have reduced the average age of diagnosis, many parents still experience delays. Signs of autism are typically noticed between 2 and 3 years old, but the first attempt to seek help often does not lead to follow-up care, causing further delays. As of 2013, the average age of diagnosis was around 5.5 years, still later than the recommended age. A quarter of children are diagnosed four years after the first signs, and 10% after eight years.

Reliable screening can start as early as 18 months using tools like the M-CHAT test. More accurate diagnoses can be made with tests like ADOS and ADI-R. Asperger syndrome, a form of autism, is often harder to diagnose due to subtle symptoms and no language delay, which can lead to delayed diagnoses and support. Some individuals with Asperger's syndrome may not receive support, and reluctance from health professionals to diagnose autism or Asperger's has contributed to these delays.

== Interventions ==
Video introduction to the work of building language skills in autistic children.

In France, autism interventions and expertise are primarily viewed as part of the medical field. The level of support for autistic individuals varies based on factors like social background, financial resources, and location. Wealthier families may have access to private resources, while others, particularly those with highly intensive support needs, may face challenges in finding adequate support. Research indicates that children from disadvantaged backgrounds, especially immigrants, are more likely to use child psychiatry services, though autism affects all social groups. Autistic individuals have rights, including dignity, privacy, freedom of movement, access to care, and participation in society.

=== Psychological support ===
Psychological support in France is available but often influenced by psychoanalytic approaches. These treatments focus on improving relationships and reducing anxiety, rather than traditional psychoanalytic methods.

=== Autism Resource Center ===
There are 26 Autism Resource Centers (CRAs) in France that provide support but do not make diagnoses. These centers work with medical teams to offer guidance.

=== Disability organizations ===
Disability organizations, such as departmental centers (MDPH), help with administrative tasks, and medico-social services (SAMSAH) assist with social and professional reintegration.

Despite efforts, there remains some discomfort in associating autism with disability, with a perceived disconnect between autism-focused and disability advocacy groups.

== Discrimination and social problems ==
A 2016 IFOP survey found that 79% of French people believe autistic individuals face discrimination. Common misconceptions about autism include ideas of violence, unpredictability, and insensitivity. French society struggles with accepting people who do not fit social norms, and negative views often stem from past associations with severe communication and social challenges.

Josef Schovanec's report highlights the challenges autistic people face, such as exclusion, limited opportunities, and difficulties accessing medical care, especially in adulthood. Many also experience social and psychological struggles. Schovanec emphasizes that social development is more influenced by the environment than the severity of autism.

The economic crisis is thought to increase rejection of those seen as "different," adding financial and social burdens for autistic individuals and their families. Autistic people also face higher suicide rates, with studies showing a rate nine times higher than the general population, and difficulties with driving and housing depending on their independence.

The issue of deinstitutionalization remains debated. While those in institutions may have their basic needs met, individuals outside institutions can face precarious situations, especially if they are seen as autonomous but lack support.

=== Use of the word "autistic" as an insult ===
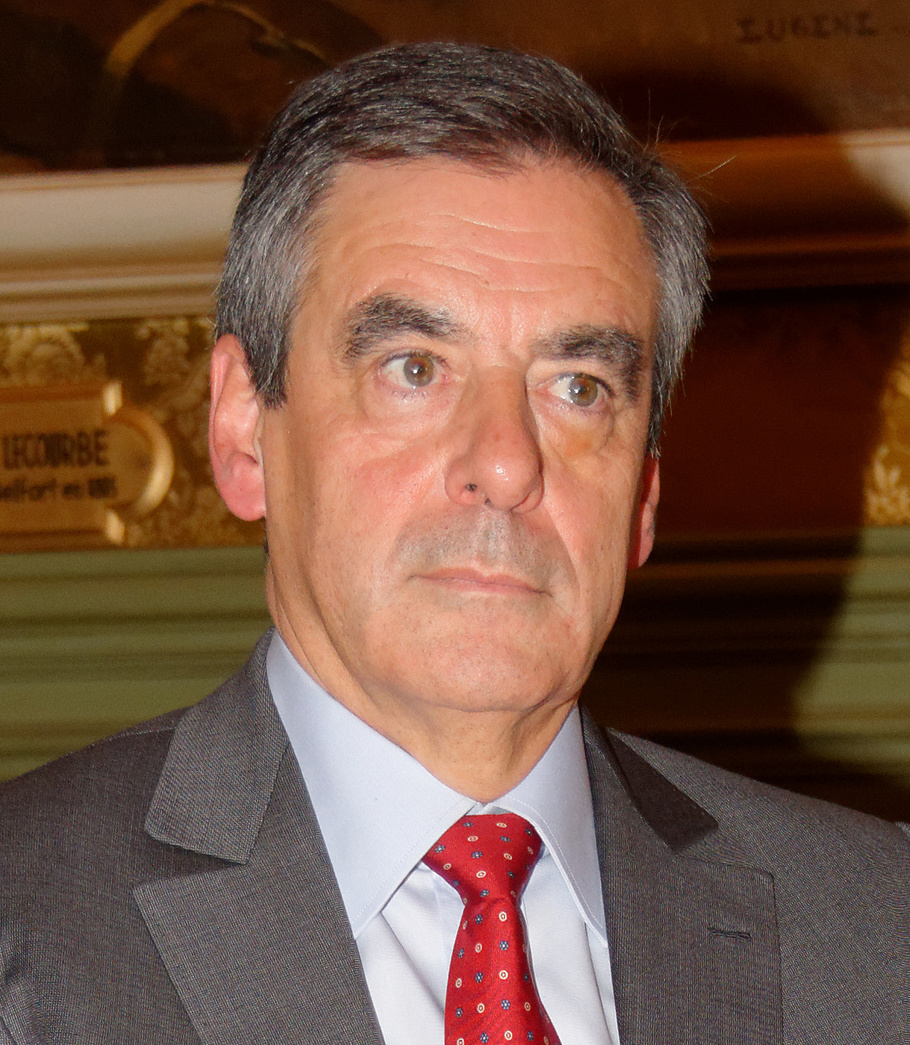
François Fillon repeated "I'm not autistic" three times during the 8pm news on France 2 on 5 March 2017.

In France, the term "autistic" is often used as an insult, reinforcing negative stereotypes about autism. It is commonly associated with being strange or unsociable, though this does not reflect the reality of autism.

A 2016 survey found that 72% of French people were surprised by the use of "autistic" as an insult, with younger people more likely to use it in this way. This shift in meaning has occurred alongside increased public representation of autism, which often reinforces negative images.

Autism is sometimes linked to psychiatric or psychological conditions in the public mind, contributing to its use as an insult. The term has been used in various media and political contexts in a derogatory manner, leading to public debate and raising awareness of the issue, though these discussions often lack a clear understanding of autism.

The High Authority for Health recommends using the term "autistic person" instead of other phrases like "person with autism" or "autistic" as shorthand.

=== Access to education and leisure ===
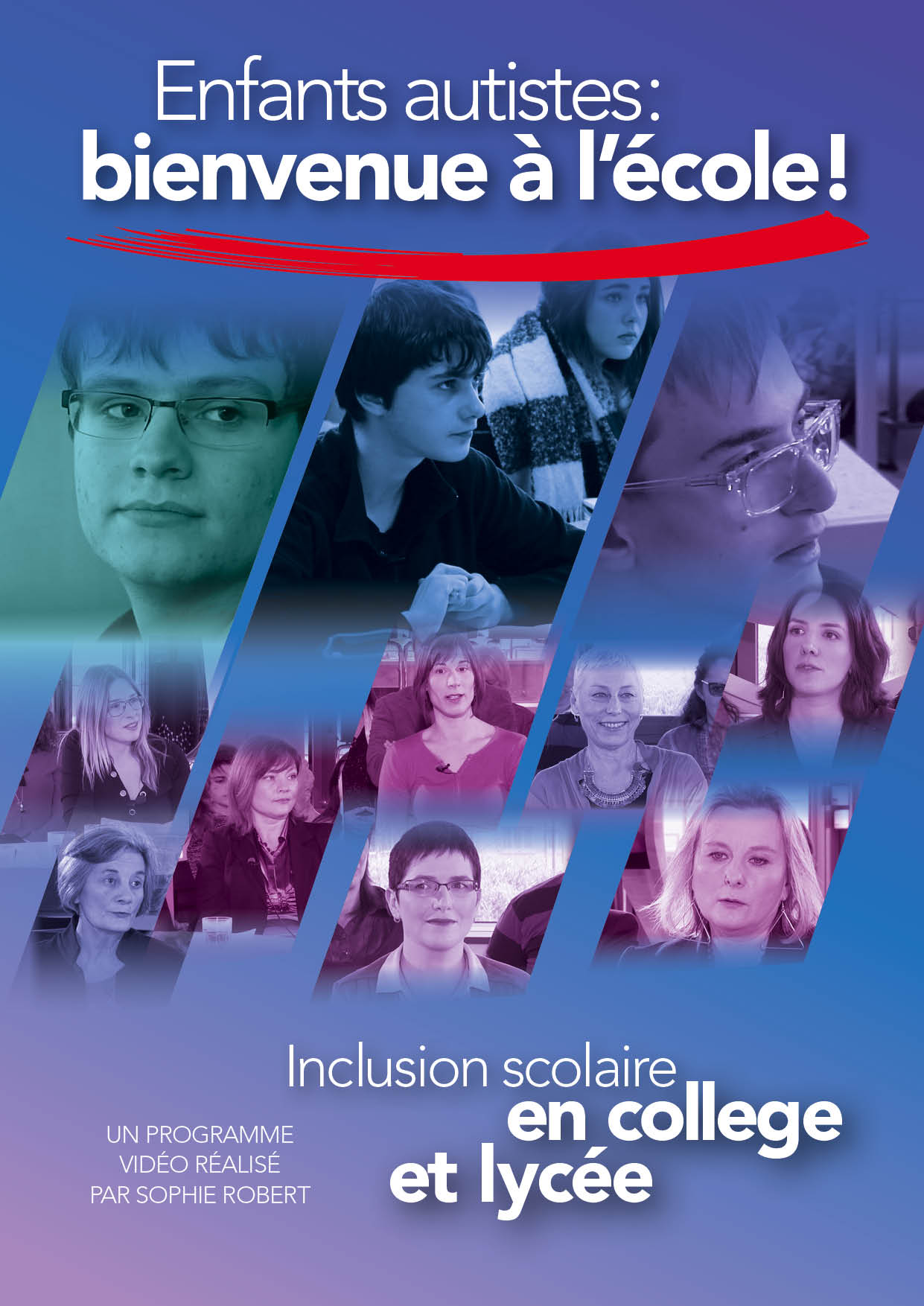
Cover of a DVD distributed by Sophie Robert, designed to promote the inclusion of autistic pupils in schools.

In France, the issue of schooling for autistic individuals has gained attention in recent years, with a focus on care over education until the 1980s. The inclusion of autistic students in mainstream schools started in the 2000s, following the 2005 disability law.

While the rate of inclusion in regular classrooms has increased, it remains low, with around 20% of autistic children attending mainstream schools as of 2012. Many are placed in special classes or units with limited time in general education. In 2014, nursery school units for autistic children were created, but the enrollment rate for autistic children in France is still lower than in other Western countries.

Challenges such as inadequate teacher training, lack of individualized support, and limited access to education for children with severe autism continue. Many parents provide care themselves due to a lack of school or childcare options. Despite some improvement, France has faced criticism from the Council of Europe for discrimination against autistic children and inadequate access to education.

=== Employment ===
The employment situation for autistic individuals in France remains difficult, with efforts still in early stages. There is a lack of statistical data, as many autistic adults are undiagnosed. Some views, particularly from the anti-psychiatry movement, have contributed to exclusion from employment, viewing work as harmful. Employment opportunities have traditionally been limited to medical-professional institutes, which often do not address the needs of autistic people. There's also a misconception that only those with severe autism cannot work, despite no evidence linking disability severity to job skills. Some companies are now seeking "Asperger profiles," while others note that many autistic people prefer more private work settings. Suggested fields for employment include translation, mechanics, IT, and arts and crafts.

Surveys show general support for the inclusion of autistic people in the workforce, but the number of autistic adults employed in regular jobs remains low, with many excluded, particularly those with invisible disabilities.

== Research ==
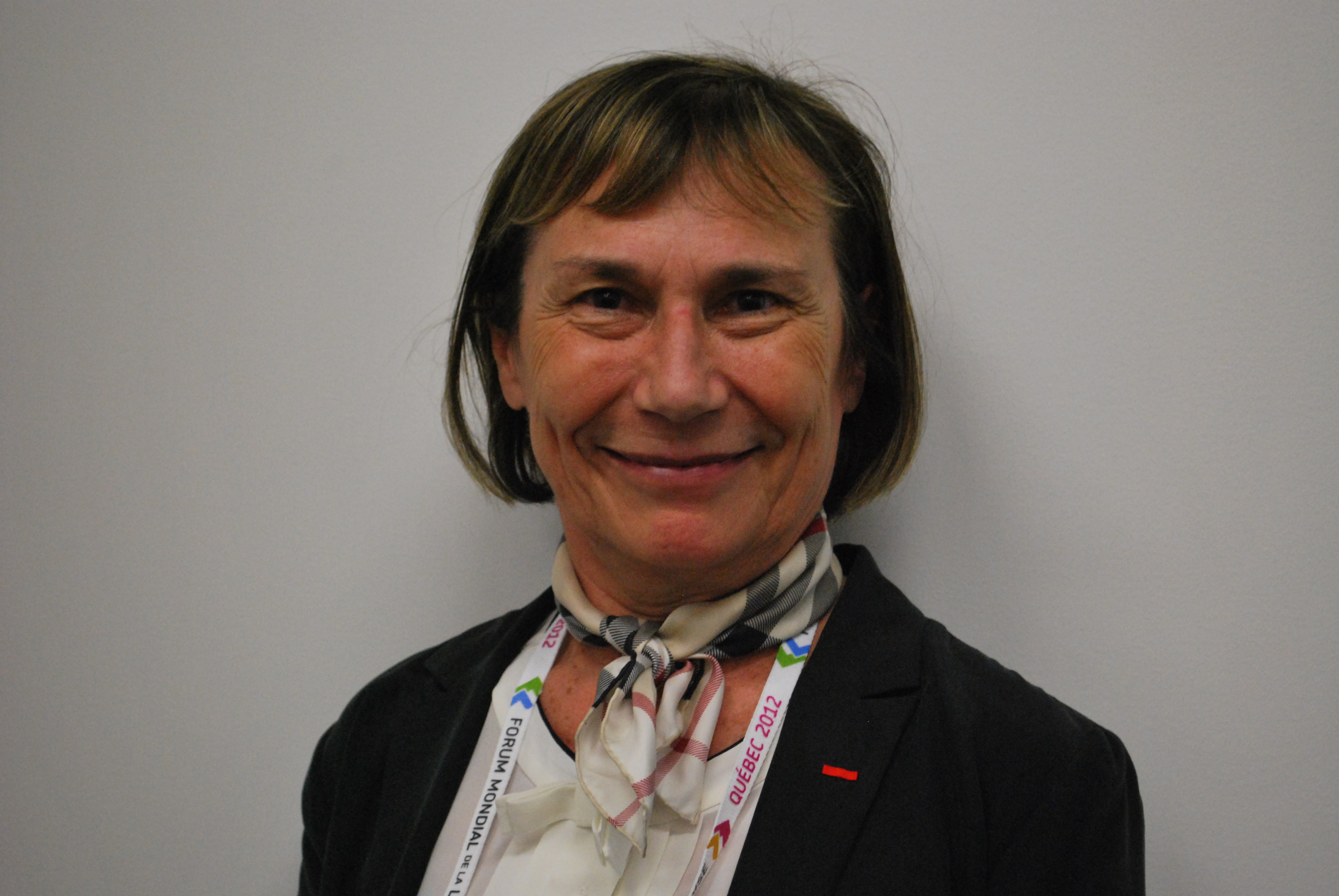
Catherine Barthélémy, French researcher awarded for her work on autism.

Several research units and researchers in France have contributed to the study of autism. A key team at the CHRU of Tours, including Gilbert Lelord and Catherine Barthélémy, established the first research unit dedicated to autism at INSERM in 1988. The team also includes child psychiatrists such as Dominique Sauvage and Frédérique Bonnet-Brilhault, who were involved in developing exchange and development therapy.

=== Neuroscientists ===
In neuroscience, Marion Leboyer and Bernadette Rogé have made significant contributions, with Rogé receiving the Legion of Honor in 2012 for her work. Thomas Bourgeron's team discovered the first monogenic mutation linked to autism in 2007. Other notable researchers include Éric Lemonnier and Laurent Mottron, who opposed psychoanalytic approaches to autism, and Franck Ramus, a more recent contributor to autism research.

=== Psychoanalysts ===
Psychoanalysts like Françoise Dolto, who believed autism was caused by negative relationships with the mother, have been associated with early views on autism, though some argue these ideas led to misunderstandings. Maud Mannoni and Serge Lebovici also promoted psychoanalytic perspectives on autism. Other researchers, such as Bernard Golse and Pierre Delion, focused on child development and therapy, while Jacques Hochmann and Henri Rey-Flaud explored the history and conceptualization of autism in France. Researchers like Marie-Dominique Amy, Marie-Christine Laznik, and Jean-Claude Maleval have examined autism through psychoanalytic and Lacanian lenses, focusing on communication, development, and socialization.

== Associative fabric and networks ==
In France, there are many associations for parents of autistic children and/or autistic individuals, including those diagnosed with Asperger's syndrome. Most national associations have their headquarters in Paris, while several quality regional associations are also active across the country.

=== Parent associations ===
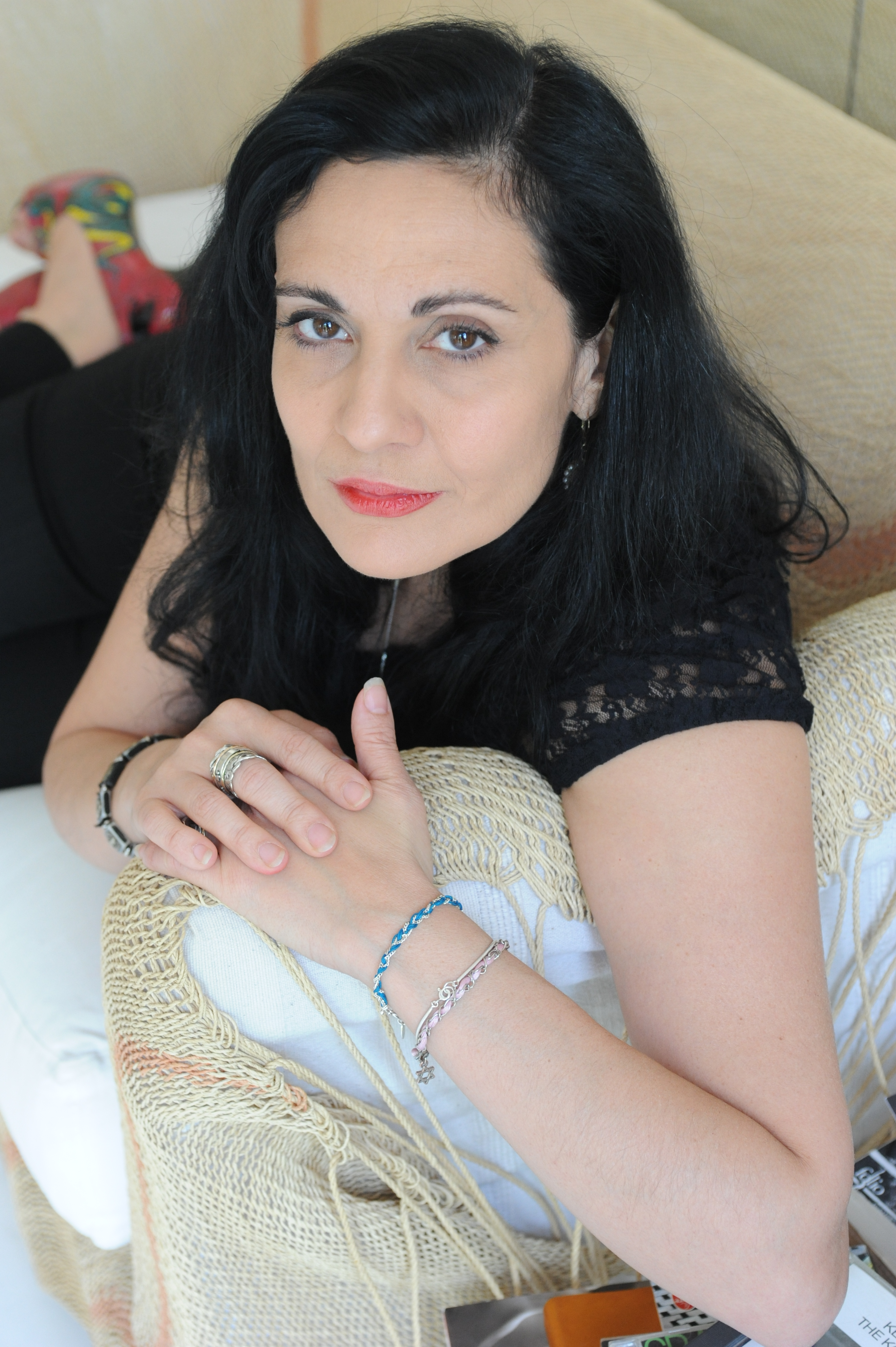
Olivia Cattan, mother of an autistic child and president of SOS Autisme France.

In France, associations focused on autism were largely created by parents in response to institutional shortcomings and poor relationships with health professionals. These associations began playing a larger role in public decision-making in the 2000s, helping to shape the approach to autism, including changes in diagnoses, interventions, and public perceptions. They have generally pushed for broader diagnostic criteria and have emphasized a neurological understanding of autism, although some families remain underrepresented. These groups often focus on neuroscience research and are typically led by middle or upper-class parents who utilize legal, media, and other resources.

The first parent association for children with disabilities, including those with autism, was established in 1962. In the 1980s, several new associations were formed, including AIDERA, Autisme Île-de-France, and others. These associations were involved in promoting different treatment approaches, such as cognitive-behavioral therapy (CBT), which led to disagreements with psychoanalysts and the eventual formation of opposing groups like Autisme France and Sésame Autisme. These two associations played a key role in the debate over autism treatment in France.

In 1991, Autisme France became a major association in the field, focusing on challenging psychiatry-psychoanalysis and organizing scientific events and political discussions. Other associations like Vaincre Autisme, the Autism Foundation, and SOS Autisme France are also active in France. Several associations, including Asperger Aide France and Sésame Autisme, are part of the "Autism Collective," which represents around 30,000 families affected by autism. These groups also manage establishments and play roles as employers in the field.

=== Associations and networks of autistic people ===
In the early 2000s, there was no organization representing autistic people in France, leading to the creation of SATEDI, the first French-speaking association focused on self-representation for autistic individuals. The Autistic Alliance, founded in 2014 by Eric Lucas, is an association of autistic people opposed to the "defectological" view of autism and advocates for the rights of autistic individuals in line with international conventions.

A National Consultative Committee of Autistic People of France (CCNAF) was also established to represent people with disabilities in accordance with the UN convention. In 2016, the French-speaking Association of Autistic Women was created.

Since the 2000s, autistic individuals have organized online discussions and events, including "Asperger cafés" and regional associations like Asperger Amitié and Asperger Lorraine. Josef Schovanec has recommended specific discussion forums for people affected by autism, including those by the Asperansa and SATEDI associations.

=== Health professional associations ===
Health professionals became involved in autism-related associations as well. The Association for Research on Autism and the Prevention of Maladaptations (ARAPI) was founded in 1983, featuring equal representation from both parents and health professionals. In 2004, psychoanalysts Geneviève Haag and Marie-Dominique Amy founded the International Coordination for Psychotherapists and Psychoanalysts Working with Autistic Individuals, called CIPPA.

== Representations of autism in the media and the French cultural environment ==
The word "autism" was largely unknown in French media until the 1990s. In 1974, a program by Daniel Karlin on the ORTF introduced of Bruno Bettelheim's orthogenic school and his theory of The Empty Fortress, influencing the perception of autism in France, particularly among psychoanalysts. This sparked controversy over the role of parents, especially mothers, in the development of autism. Further controversies arose in 1988 when the TEACCH method was introduced to the public. Since then, media coverage of autism has increasingly focused on criticisms of French psychiatry, especially from parent associations, particularly since 2012. Changes in the definition of autism and its increased prevalence have led to more media attention. However, Josef Schovanec notes a "bilateral misunderstanding" between the autism community and the media, with some French associations feeling negative about this coverage. Stories about mistreatment in establishments are frequently reported, and public perception of autism remains poor, as seen when the media quickly linked an American mass killer to autism in 2012.

In 2016, a special program on autism on France 2 attracted more than 3 million viewers, achieving the second-best audience score of the evening among French television channels.

=== Documentaries ===
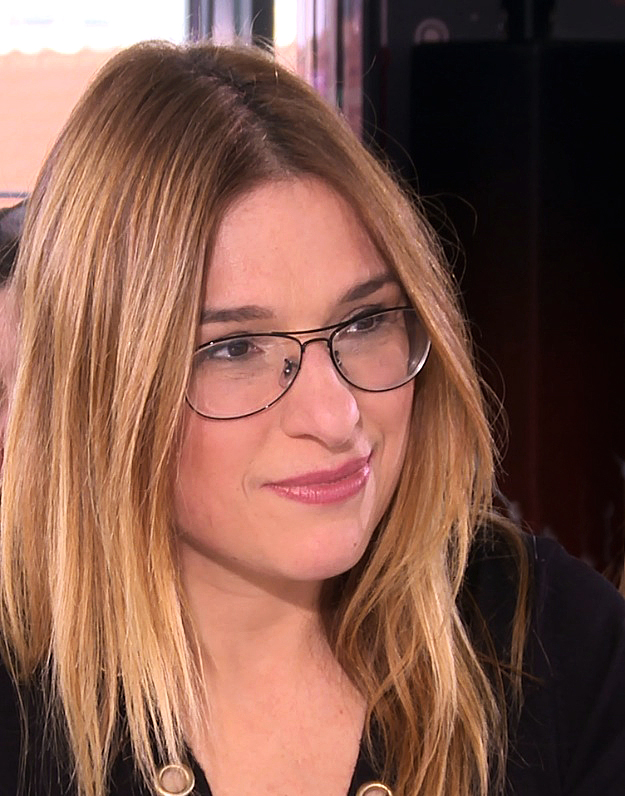
Sophie Robert, director of the documentary Le Mur.

The Sésame Autisme association co-produced the documentary La vie en miettes, which aired on France 2 in 1994. In 2008, Sandrine Bonnaire directed Elle s'appelle Sabine, a documentary about her sister, Sabine, who had been institutionalized since her late 20s. The film portrays Sabine's love for English, geography, and music before her hospitalization.

In 2011, the documentary Le Mur by Sophie Robert sparked a controversy regarding the treatment of autism in France. The film highlighted the difference between the views of psychoanalysts and scientific knowledge on autism. The psychoanalysts featured in the film filed a complaint, leading to a two-year censorship, which was later overturned by the courts in 2013.

Sophie Révil's 2012 documentary Le Cerveau d'Hugo tells the fictional story of Hugo, an autistic person, from childhood to adulthood, combining real-life testimonies. The film explores the evolving understanding of autism. In 2012, American activist Alex Plank released a documentary Shameful, addressing the situation of autistic people in France. In 2016, Julie Bertuccelli's Dernières Nouvelles du cosmos focused on Babouillec, a non-verbal autistic poet.

=== Fiction films ===
Fiction films have also explored autism. Le Goût des merveilles, features an autistic man with hypersensitivity and talents in mathematics, inspired by the lives of figures like Daniel Tammet and Temple Grandin. Monsieur je-sais-tout (2018) tells the story of an autistic footballer. Hors normes (2019) focuses on the work of educators with autistic children and adolescents, adapted from the novel by Alain Gillot, The Repair Surface (Flammarion, 2015).

=== Autistic people ===
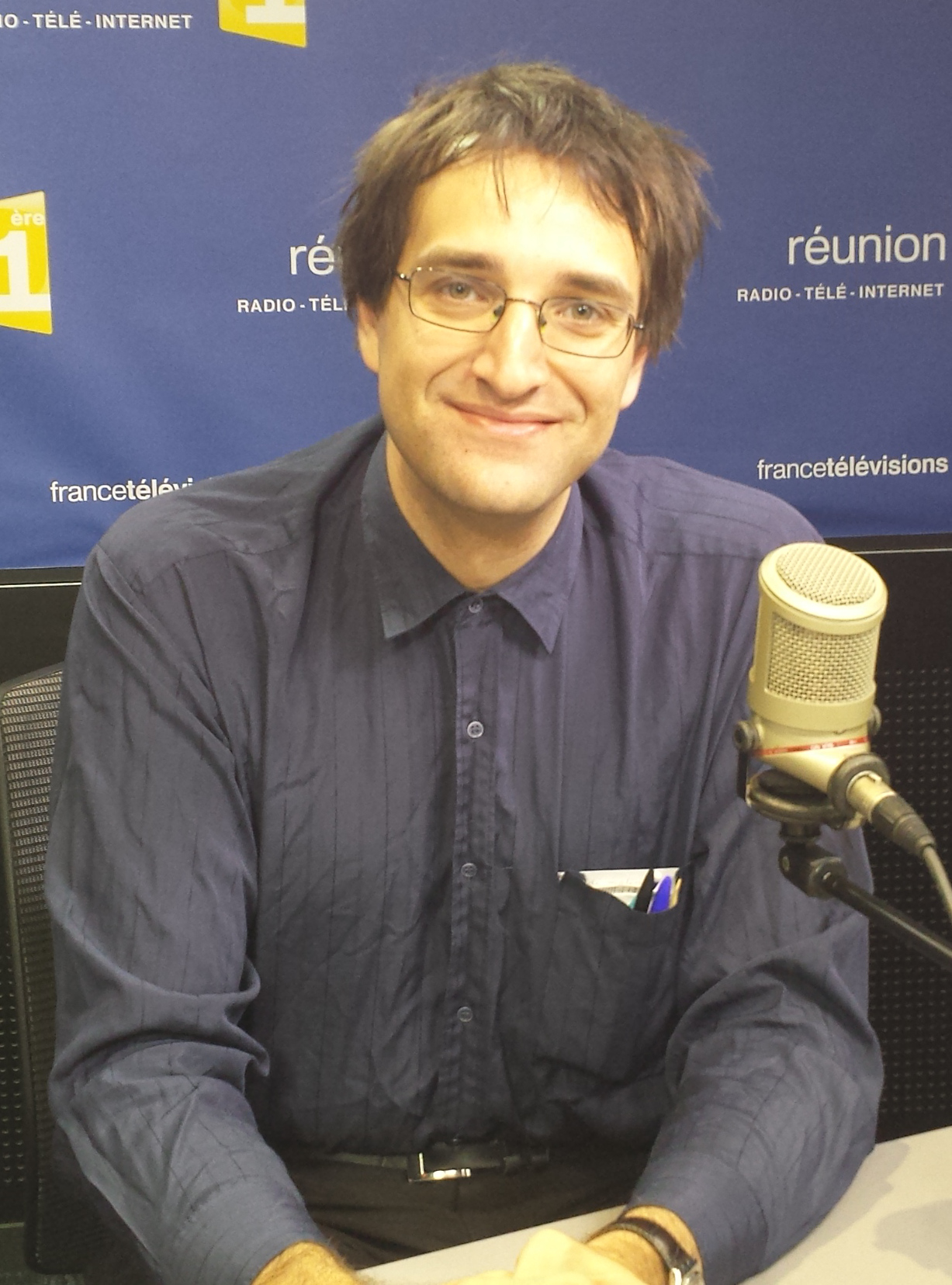
Josef Schovanec, writer, radio columnist and activist, is also the author of a government report on the employment of autistic adults in France.

Several autistic individuals and activists have contributed to the movement for the rights of autistic people through writing and speaking engagements. Hugo Horiot, author of The Emperor, It's Me, received the Patient Words Prize in 2013, and ran for the 2017 French presidential election to advocate for neurodiversity. He is critical of psychoanalysis, considering it "harmful".

Josef Schovanec, a polyglot and researcher, was a spokesperson for autistic people during the 2012 National Cause Year. He also published his first book, Je suis à l'Est!, reflecting on his life and experiences as an autistic person. He advocates for the benefits of travel for autistic individuals:

Travel, like medicines in physical form, should be reimbursed by Social Security . I think in particular of all the autistic people, who have committed no crime, and yet spend their lives in closed establishments. What walls could contain their cries? What chemical straitjacket is the scandal?

— Josef Schovanec, In praise of travel for autistic people and those who are not autistic enough.

Julie Dachez, a social science researcher and YouTuber, has written a comic strip about her life with Asperger syndrome and published In Your Bubble: Autistic People Have the Floor, combining personal and activist perspectives. In 2020, a graphic novel partially based on her experiences as an autistic woman was released in English as Invisible Differences. Émilien Hamel, a baritone singer and composer, founded an ensemble of autistic and non-autistic musicians.

=== Parents ===
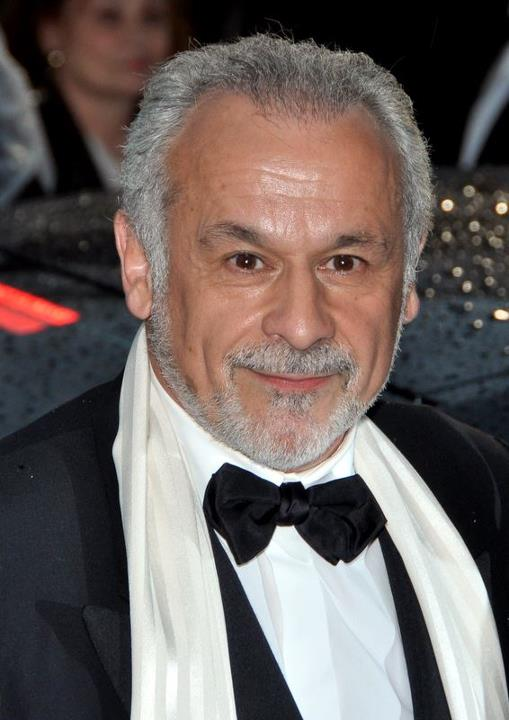
Francis Perrin, father of an autistic child.

Several French parents have also been active in advocating for autism rights. Danièle Langloys (Autisme France) and M'Hammed Sajidi (Vaincre l'autisme) are among them. In 2000, Annie Beaufils, a mother of an autistic child, protested forced placements in institutions through a hunger strike. Paul and Chantal Tréhin, parents of artist Gilles Tréhin, campaigned against psychoanalysis and encouraged other parents to join autism associations.

Media personalities have shared their experiences as well. Francis and Gersende Perrin wrote Louis, Pas à Pas, about raising their autistic son and advocating for the ABA method. Olivia Cattan, president of SOS Autisme France, supports CBT and discusses the challenges faced by families affected by autism in her autobiography. Television host Églantine Éméyé, in contrast, defends the practice of packing in her autobiography The Toothbrush Thief, based on her son's positive experiences.

== Controversies ==
Autism in France is a subject of ongoing controversy. Travel writer Adam Feinstein, in his 2010 book A History of Autism: Conversations with the Pioneers, noted that France "remains retrograde" in its approach to autism, with many individuals diagnosed with autism being placed in psychiatric hospitals.

Disciplinary rivalries, competition between theories and approaches, and differing methods of intervention contribute to these controversies. These conflicts are often seen as more harmful than helpful, delaying progress in public policies related to autism. Jacques Hochmann criticizes what he sees as a "communitarianism in the battle of autism", pointing to the tension between parent associations and autistic individuals' activism. Josef Schovanec observes that concerns about communitarianism in autism are more prominent in France than in Anglo-Saxon countries, where such concerns are less common.

=== Lack of knowledge ===
There is a notable gap between international scientific knowledge on autism and the practices in France, according to Catherine Barthélémy and Frédérique Bonnet-Brilhault (2012). Many institutions serving autistic children continue to use outdated or unproven theories. A 2017 audit found that only 14% of these institutions follow current scientific recommendations, with some presenting autism as an infantile psychosis. Additionally, the focus on autism as a medical condition rather than a disability persists, despite the 2005 law. Training in early detection remains insufficient, and wait times for diagnoses can be long. Rural areas, in particular, face challenges in raising awareness and providing accurate diagnoses.

A 2010 survey by the Autism Collective found that 90% of French people were unaware of autism's prevalence, and a significant number of general practitioners lacked knowledge of the condition. In 2016, a survey showed that most people underestimated the number of people affected by autism. The lack of specialized training and understanding of autistic people's needs remains a major issue.

Josef Schovanec highlights the misconception that autistic people are mentally disordered and the persistent association of autism with childhood. He stresses the importance of improving the dissemination of accurate knowledge and best practices.

=== Parental guilt and insecurity ===
According to Feinstein (2010), some French professionals still believe that parents are responsible for their children's autism. This belief, rooted in the refrigerator mother theory, has caused significant distress for both parents and children, who were often seen as uneducable. This view has contributed to the ongoing tension between parent associations and health professionals. Brigitte Chamak mentions that many parents have shared stories of mistreatment, including being blamed for their child's condition and facing a lack of proper support or educational interventions. Some psychiatrists have even denied autism diagnoses or special education assistance, contrary to disability laws. Chamak also notes that psychodynamic approaches often focus on parent-child relationships and can lead to judgments about parents' abilities. When treatments fail, the blame is frequently placed on the parents or children rather than the therapies themselves.

Olivia Cattan emphasizes the challenges faced by parents, particularly single-parent or middle-class families, who often have to abandon careers to care for their children due to a lack of available care services. Wealthier families may move to countries with better care, while poorer families face increased social inequality due to inadequate resources.

=== Interventions ===
According to a government report by Christel Prado (2012), interventions for autism in France have been the subject of ongoing debates between proponents of psychoanalysis and those advocating for educational approaches. This has created challenges for autistic individuals and their families.

==== Psychoanalysis ====
Many parents and researchers oppose the use of psychoanalysis in treating autism. They criticize its continued influence in France, particularly through the legacy of figures like Bruno Bettelheim. Experts like Fred R. Volkmar have expressed surprise at the persistence of psychoanalytic approaches, which they see as outdated compared to practices in other countries. Some argue that psychoanalysis in France is maintained due to the influence of authoritative figures and intellectual circles.

Sociologist Cécile Méadel observed in 2006 that psychoanalytic views on autism were still widely used, sparking strong reactions from parents. Brigitte Chamak's study of French child psychiatric services in 2009 found that psychoanalytic theories were still prominent in the training of psychiatrists, though many parents rejected the idea that they were responsible for their child's autism. These psychoanalytic approaches were often seen as pessimistic regarding the potential for improvement in autistic children.

A review of French literature on autism, conducted from 1989 to 2014, revealed a dominance of psychoanalytic and psychiatric perspectives. However, experts like Laurent Mottron have criticized these outdated approaches, acknowledging that France's methods were out of step with global standards. Chamak further emphasized that the situation in France is complex and cannot be solely attributed to psychoanalysis, as it also involves issues like insufficient specialized services.

Some child psychoanalyst, like Maria Rhode, argue that it's a misconception that all psychoanalysts blame parents for autism. Claude Wacjman suggests that educational and therapeutic approaches can be complementary, and that psychoanalysis can include educational elements if properly integrated.

==== Packing ====
Packing, also known as wet wrapping, involves wrapping an autistic person in cold, damp cloths, which are gradually warmed. This technique is primarily used in France, despite being abandoned in most other countries due to a scientific consensus against it. Some French professionals, like Professor Pierre Delion, believe it can be beneficial for treating autistic and psychotic children. However, critics, including M'hammed Sajidi, point out contradictions, noting that children undergoing packing are often also medicated. Parent associations strongly oppose the practice, calling it harmful.

International bodies, including the UN Committee on the Rights of the Child (CRC), have recommended banning the technique, considering it a form of ill-treatment. In response, French authorities, including Ségolène Neuville, called for public institutions to stop using packing in 2016. A bill to ban the practice and its teaching was proposed in May 2016.

==== Behaviorism and cognitivism ====
Cognitive-behavioral therapies (CBT) are controversial in France. Some studies suggest CBT can help reduce issues like anxiety and anger in people with autism, which led to recommendations for its use. However, some critics argue that France's strong push away from psychoanalytic approaches has led to an uncritical acceptance of behavioral therapies, with little public questioning of their effectiveness.

Psychoanalysts like Pierre Delion and Yannick Pinard criticize the dominance of behavioral methods, calling it an over-simplification and a political decision influenced by external pressures. They argue that these therapies focus too much on behavior without considering the unique cognitive and emotional aspects of autistic individuals.

Reports from parent associations and organizations highlight concerns about the cost and potential mistreatment in centers using CBT, with some even citing dysfunctions in specific centers. These concerns have received limited media coverage.

=== Abusive placements ===
The placement of autistic children is a sensitive issue in France. Some parents report that child welfare services often request the separation of autistic children from their families. Parents' associations have criticized this practice, claiming that autism is sometimes confused with abuse, leading to unjust placements. This issue was highlighted by the Committee on the Rights of the Child in 2016, which called for better protection for autistic children and their families in these situations.

In 2015, the Rachel Affair, involving the placement of the three children of a divorced mother on the grounds of Münchhausen syndrome by proxy and parental alienation syndrome, was heavily publicized by parents associations of autistic children.

=== Departures in Belgium and Switzerland ===
In 2007, around 3,500 French autistic children were placed in medical and educational institutions in Belgium due to a shortage of appropriate facilities in France. This practice has continued in recent years, with some parents sending their children to Belgium or Switzerland for education, often covered by social security. Some parents believe that the care available in these countries is better than in France.

=== Maltreatment in institutions ===
The associations Vaincre l'Autisme and SOS Autisme France have highlighted concerns about mistreatment in care facilities. In 2014, the Autism Collective estimated that 43.8% of French autistic individuals have experienced mistreatment in such establishments. Issues reported include excessive medication to manage staff, and cases of physical restraint or poor living conditions. These problems are often attributed to a lack of staff and the inexperience of nursing assistants.

=== Over-medication ===
The children's rights committee, along with autistic individuals such as Josef Schovanec and Stefany Bonnot-Briey, have raised concerns about overmedication by some psychiatrists. Schovanec highlights that certain young people, particularly men, are prescribed multiple neuroleptics at once, which can be debilitating and harmful in the long term. This practice is sometimes seen as aiming to reduce disturbances rather than promoting the individual’s development.

== See also ==
- Autism in psychoanalysis
- Disability in France
- Sex and gender differences in autism
- Epidemiology of autism

== Bibliography ==
=== French official sources ===
- Ministère des Affaires sociales et de la Santé (2024a). "Qu'est-ce que l'autisme ?". Ministère des Affaires sociales et de la Santé.
- Ministère des Affaires sociales et de la Santé (2024b). "L'état des connaissances". Ministère des Affaires sociales et de la Santé. Archived from the original on 10 May 2017.
- Ministère des Affaires sociales et de la Santé (2024c). "Le plan autisme". Ministère des Affaires sociales et de la Santé.
- Ministère des Affaires sociales et de la Santé (2024d). "Les idées reçues". Ministère des Affaires sociales et de la Santé.
- Chossy, Jean-François (2003). La situation des personnes autistes en France: besoins et perspectives (PDF).
- CCNE, Comité consultatif national d'éthique pour les Sciences de la Vie et de la Santé (2007). "Sur la situation en France des personnes, enfants et adultes, atteintes d'autisme" (PDF).
- HAS, Haute Autorité de santé (2010). "Autisme et autres troubles envahissants du développement : État des connaissances hors mécanismes physiopathologiques, psychopathologiques et recherche fondamentale" (PDF).
- HAS, Haute Autorité de santé (2012). "Autisme et autres troubles envahissants du développement : interventions éducatives et thérapeutiques coordonnées chez l'enfant et l'adolescent" (PDF).
- HAS, Haute Autorité de santé (2017). "Trouble du spectre de l'autisme : Interventions et parcours de vie de l'adulte" (PDF).
- Compagnon, Claire; Petrault, Gilles; Corlay, Delphine (2017). "Évaluation du 3e plan autisme dans la perspective de l'élaboration d'un 4e plan" (PDF). Inspection générale des affaires sociales et Inspection générale de l'éducation nationale. Archived from the original (PDF) on 28 March 2024.
- Prado, Christel (2012). "Le coût économique et social de l'autisme" (PDF). Conseil économique, social et environnemental.
- Schovanec, Josef (2017a). "Rapport présenté à la Secrétaire d'Etat chargée des Personnes handicapées et de la Lutte contre l'exclusion sur le devenir professionnel des personnes autistes". Ministère des affaires sociales et de la santé.

==== Other government sources ====
- French Government (2005). "Les jeunes adultes relevant de l'amendement Creton" (PDF). Direction de la recherche des études des évaluations et des statistiques. Archived from the original (PDF) on 15 June 2007.
- French Government (2012). "Proposition de loi no 4211, relu le 13 décembre 2013. Exposé des motifs". Direction de la recherche des études des évaluations et des statistiques.
- French Government (2016b). "Lancement du site officiel www.autisme.gouv.fr – Dossiers de presse". Ministère des Affaires sociales et de la Santé. Archived from the original on 1 April 2017.
- Barreyte, Jean-Yves; Peintre, Carole (2005). "Délégation ANCREAI Île-de-France-CEDIAS, Les jeunes adultes relevant de l'amendement Creton". Direction de la recherche des études des évaluations et des statistiques. Archived from the original on 1 February 2017.
- Létard, Valérie (2011). "Évaluation de l'impact du Plan Autisme 2008–2010" (PDF).
- Neuville, Ségolène (2016). "La psychanalyse ne fait pas partie des méthodes recommandées pour les enfants autistes!". La Chaîne parlementaire. Archived from the original on 17 May 2020.
- Fasquelle, Daniel (2016). "N° 4134 (rectifié) Proposition de résolution invitant le Gouvernement à promouvoir une prise en charge de l'autisme basée sur les recommandations de la Haute Autorité de santé". Assemblée nationale.
- Vallaud-Belkacem, Najat. (2016). "Scolarisation des élèves présentant des troubles autistiques ou des troubles envahissants du développement : 50 emplois dédiés pour l'année scolaire 2016–2017". Ministère de l'Éducation nationale, de l'Enseignement supérieur et de la Recherche. Archived from the original on 2 July 2017.
- Ministère des Affaires sociales et de la Santé (2016a). "Préparation du 4e Plan Autisme". Ministère des Affaires sociales et de la Santé.
- Ministère des Affaires sociales et de la Santé (2017). "Réunion de la commission scientifique internationale sur l'autisme" (PDF). Ministère des Affaires sociales et de la Santé.
- Bauer, Franck; Conso, Françoise; Journiac, Marie; Lavie, Jacques; Mauger, Jean; Riot, René (2007). "Décret du 31 décembre 2006 portant promotion et nomination". République Française.
- Jamet-Lardé, Marie-Claire; Limouzy, Jacques; Régnier, Gérard (2012). "Décret du 13 juillet 2012 portant promotion et nomination, Journal officiel de la République française, no 0163, 14 juillet 2012, p. 11554". République Française.
- Herrero, Elodie (2017). "Université Toulouse – Jean Jaurès – Bernadette Rogé, récompensée pour son parcours de chercheuse et ses travaux sur l'autisme". Université Toulouse-Jean-Jaurès. Archived from the original on 18 September 2017.
- Toutin-Lasri, Valérie (2017). "Instruction N° DGCS/SD4/2017/44 du 6 février 2017 relative au recueil national des contenus de formations délivrés pour les quatre diplômes suivants, en matière d'autisme : Diplôme d'Etat d'Educateur Spécialisé; Diplôme d'Etat d'Educateur pour Jeunes Enfants; Diplôme d'Etat de Moniteur Educateur; Diplôme d'Etat d'Aide Médico-Psychologique" (PDF). Ministère des affaires sociales et de la santé.
- Ministère des Affaires sociales et de la Santé (2016b). "Discours de Ségolène Neuville – Comité National Autisme – Bilan d'étape du Plan Autisme 2013–2017" (PDF). Ministère des Affaires sociales et de la Santé.
- Assemblée nationale (2016). "N° 3727 – Proposition de loi de M. Daniel Fasquelle visant à interdire la pratique du packing, ou enveloppement corporel humide, sur toute personne atteinte du spectre autistique, ainsi que son enseignement". Assemblée nationale.

=== International official sources ===
- Europarat (1995). Exclusion, égalité devant la loi et non-discrimination: actes; séminaire organisé par le Secrétariat Général du Conseil de l'Europe ...; Taormina-Mare (Italie), 29 sept. – 1 oct. 1994. Strasbourg: Ed. du Conseil de l'Europe. ISBN 978-92-871-2713-6.
- Council of Europe (2014b). "Action européenne des handicapés (AEH) c. France, Réclamation n° 81/2012". Council of Europe.
- Comité des droits de l'enfant (2016). "Observations finales concernant le cinquième rapport périodique de la France". United Nations Human Rights Treaty Bodies.

=== CFTMEA ===
- Misès, Roger (2012). Classification française des troubles mentaux de l'enfant et de l'adolescent R-2012 Correspondances et transcodage CIM 10 (5e éd ed.). Rennes: Presses de l'École des hautes études en santé publique. ISBN 978-2-8109-0082-4.

=== Medical and social surveys ===
- Fondation Jean Jaurès (2016). "Le regard des Français sur l'autisme". Fondation Jean Jaurès. Archived from the original on 13 April 2016.
- Doctissimo-FondaMental (2013). "L'autisme en France – Diagnostic et parcours de soin. Résultats de l'enquête" (PDF). Fondation Fondamental. Archived from the original (PDF) on 20 March 2017.
- Chamak, Brigitte; Cohen, David (2007). "Transformations des représentations de l'autisme et de sa prise en charge". Perspectives Psy. 46 (4): 404–409. doi:10.1051/ppsy/2006454404. ISSN 0031-6032.
- Chamak, Brigitte (2009). "L'autisme dans un service de pédopsychiatrie. Les relations parents/professionnels". Ethnologie française (in French). 39 (3): 425–433. doi:10.3917/ethn.093.0425. ISSN 0046-2616.
- Chamak, Brigitte (2013a). "Autisme : nouvelles représentations et controverses". Psychologie Clinique (in French) (36): 59–67. doi:10.1051/psyc/201336059. ISSN 1145-1882.
- Chamak, Brigitte (2013b). "Autisme : nouvelles représentations et controverses". Psychologie Clinique (in French) (36): 59–67. doi:10.1051/psyc/201336059. ISSN 1145-1882.
- Chamak, Brigitte (2012). "Autisme et stigmatisation". L'Information Psychiatrique. 87 (5): 403–407. doi:10.1684/ipe.2011.0791. ISSN 0020-0204.
- Chamak, Brigitte (2005). "Les récits de personnes autistes : une analyse socio-anthropologique" (PDF). Handicap. Revue de sciences humaines et sociales, CTNERHI. 105: 33–50.
- Chamak, Brigitte (2010). "Autisme, handicap et mouvements sociaux". Alter. 4 (2): 103–115. doi:10.1016/j.alter.2010.02.001. ISSN 1875-0672.
- Mottron, Laurent (2004). L' autisme, une autre intelligence: diagnostic, cognition et support des personnes autistes sans déficience intellectuelle. Pratiques psychologiques. Sprimont: Mardaga. ISBN 978-2-87009-869-1.
- Mottron, Laurent (2011). "The power of autism". Nature. 479 (7371): 33–35. doi:10.1038/479033a. ISSN 1476-4687. PMID 22051659.
- Mottron, Laurent (2013). L' autisme, une autre intelligence: diagnostic, cognition et support des personnes autistes sans déficience intellectuelle. Pratiques psychologiques. Sprimont: Mardaga. ISBN 978-2-87009-869-1.
- Mottron, Laurent (2016). L'intervention précoce pour enfants autistes: nouveaux principes pour soutenir une autre intelligence. PSY. Bruxelles: Mardaga. ISBN 978-2-8047-0262-5.
- Hochmann, Jacques (2009). Histoire de l'autisme: de l'enfant sauvage aux troubles envahissants du développement. Paris: O. Jacob. ISBN 978-2-7381-2153-0.
- Hochmann, Jacques; Bizouard, Paul; Bursztejn, Claude (2011). "Troubles envahissants du développement : les pratiques de soins en France". La Psychiatrie de l'Enfant (in French). 54 (2): 525–574. doi:10.3917/psye.542.0525. ISSN 0079-726X.
- Hochmann, Jacques (2016). "Le communautarisme dans la bataille de l'autisme". PSN. 14: 7–16.
- Wacjman, Claude (2013a). Clinique institutionnelle des troubles psychiques : Des enfants autistes à ceux des ITEP. Toulouse: Érès. ISBN 978-2749237954.
- Wacjman, Claude (2015). "Vers une police de l'autisme (2013-2014) ?". Psychologie Clinique (39): 7–24. doi:10.1051/psyc/201539007. ISSN 1145-1882.
- Wacjman, Claude; Douville, Olivier (2012). "La fabrication de l'autiste handicapé. Chronique d'un passage à l'acte". Figures de la Psychanalyse (24 ed.). doi:10.3917/fp. ISSN 1623-3883.
- Wacjman, Claude (2013b). "Que nous enseigne la controverse sur l'autisme ?". Psychologie Clinique (in French) (36): 8–30. doi:10.1051/psyc/201336008. ISSN 1145-1882.

=== French books and theses ===
- Barthélémy, Catherine; Bonnet-Brilhault, Frédérique (2012). L'autisme:de l'enfance à l'âge adulte (in French). Éditions Lavoisier. ISBN 978-2-257-70399-6.
- Delion, Pierre; Golse, Bernard (2013). Autisme : état des lieux et horizons. Eres.
- Ferrari, Pierre (2015). L'autisme infantile (in French). Presses universitaires de France. ISBN 9782130731108.
- Jordan, Bertrand (2012). Autisme, le gène introuvable. De la science au business (in French). Le Seuil. ISBN 978-2021075021.
- Löchen, Valérie (2016). Prise en compte de l'autisme dans Comprendre les politiques sociales (in French) (5 ed.). Dunod. ISBN 978-2100746460.
- Yvon, Dominique; Philip, Christine; Rogé, Bernadette; Schonen, Scania de (2014). À la découverte de l'autisme: des neurosciences à la vie en société. Santé social. Paris: Dunod. ISBN 978-2-10-071307-3.
  - Ramus, Franck. "Quelles questions pose l'autisme, et comment y répondre?". In Yvon et al. (2014), pp. 1-7.
  - D'arc, Baudouin Forgeot. "Qu'est-ce qu'une personne avec autisme?". In Yvon et al. (2014), pp. 8–14.
  - Freeman, Marie. "La situation en France". In Yvon et al. (2014), pp. 228–234.
  - De Schonen, Scania. "Les recommandations de la Haute Autorité de Santé". In Yvon et al. (2014), pp. 142–143.

=== International contextualization books ===
- Feinstein, Adam (2010). A history of autism: conversations with the pioneers. Chichester, West Sussex, U.K.; Malden, Massachusetts: Wiley-Blackwell. ISBN 978-1-4051-8654-4. OCLC 495597850.
- Eyal, Gil (2010). The autism matrix: the social origins of the autism epidemic. Cambridge, UK: Polity. ISBN 978-0-7456-4399-1.

=== Popular books ===
- Le Callennec, Sophie; Chapel, Florent; Schovanec, Josef (2016). Autisme: la grande enquête. Paris: les Arènes. ISBN 978-2-35204-494-9.
- Shore, Stephen M.; Rastelli, Linda G. (2015). Comprendre l'autisme. Pour les nuls. Paris: First éditions. ISBN 978-2-7540-6581-8.

=== Testimonials ===
- Cattan, Olivia (2014a). D'un monde à l'autre: l'autisme, le combat d'une mère. Essais-documents. Paris: M. Milo. ISBN 978-2-315-00492-8.
- Éméyé, Églantine (2015). Le voleur de brosses à dents. Paris: Robert Laffont. ISBN 978-2-221-14633-0.
- Perrin, Gersende; Perrin, Francis (2012). Louis, pas à pas. Le livre de poche. Paris: Librairie générale française. ISBN 978-2-253-17334-2.
- Pinard, Yannick (2016). Éducation et soin. Collection Accompagner-partager. Nîmes: Champ social éditions. ISBN 978-2-35371-893-1.
- Schovanec, Josef; Glorion, Caroline (2012). Je suis à l'est ! savant et autiste un témoignage unique. Pocket ([Nouvelle] éd ed.). Paris: Pocket. ISBN 978-2-266-24103-8.
- Schovanec, Josef (2014). Éloge du voyage à l'usage des autistes et de ceux qui ne le sont pas assez. Paris: Plon. ISBN 978-2-259-22223-5.

=== Other books ===
- Messadié, Gerald (2013). 500 ans de mystifications scientifiques. Archipel. ISBN 9782809810554.
- Delion, Pierre (2009). Séminaire sur l'autisme et la psychose infantile. Érès. ISBN 978-2749223384.
- Bueltzingsloewen, Isabelle von (2016). L'hécatombe des fous: la famine dans les hôpitaux psychiatriques français sous l'Occupation. Collection historique. Paris: Aubier. ISBN 978-2-7007-2364-9.
- Danion-Grilliat, Anne; Bursztejn, Claude (2011). Psychiatrie de l'enfant. Paris: Médecine sciences publications-[Lavoisier]. ISBN 978-2-257-20406-6.
- Guéguen, Jean-Yves (2012). L'Année de l'Action sociale 2012 - Bilan des politiques sociales: Bilan des politiques sociales, perspectives de l'action sociale. Dunod. ISBN 978-2100579198.
- Le Page, Brigitte (2014). Connaître la Fonction publique territoriale (2 ed.). Foucher. ISBN 978-2216128303.
- Des Isnards, Alexandre (2014). Dictionnaire du nouveau français. Paris: Allary. ISBN 978-2-37073-008-4.
- Sadoun, Patrick (2016). Autisme: dire l'indicible. Éditions L'Harmattan.
- Juhel, Jean-Charles; Hérault, Guy (2003). La personne autiste et le syndrome d'Asperger. Presses Université Laval.
- Allione, Marie; Allione, Claude; Hochmann, Jacques; Delion, Pierre (2013). Autisme: donner la parole aux parents. Paris: LLL, les Liens qui libèrent. ISBN 979-10-209-0030-2.
- Pleux, Didier (2008). Génération Dolto. Paris: O. Jacob. ISBN 978-2-7381-2155-4.
- Delion, Pierre (2007). La pratique du packing: avec les enfants autistes et psychotiques en pédopsychiatrie. L'ailleurs du corps. Ramonville-Saint-Agne: Éd. Érès. ISBN 978-2-7492-0773-5.
- Roudinesco, Elisabeth; Plon, Michel (2011). Dictionnaire de la psychanalyse. Le livre de poche. Paris: Librairie Arthème Fayard. ISBN 978-2-253-08854-7.
- Bourdin, Dominique (2007). La psychanalyse de Freud à aujourd'hui: histoire, concepts, pratiques. Rosny: Bréal. ISBN 978-2-84291-610-7.
- Zittoun, Catherine (2015). Sommes-nous bientraitants avec nos enfants ?. Polémiques. Montrouge: Doin-John Libbey Eurotext. ISBN 978-2-7040-1461-3.

=== Psychoanalysis articles ===
- Laznik, Marie-Christine (2015). Touati, Bernard; Joly, Fabien; Laznik-Penot, M.-C. (eds.). La prosodie avec les bébés à risque d'autisme : clinique et recherche. Le fil rouge. Section 2, Psychanalyse et psychiatrie de l'enfant. Paris: Presses universitaires de France. ISBN 978-2-13-055712-8.
- Alerini, Paul (2011). "L'autisme : symptôme de l'antipsychanalyse ?". Essaim (in French). 27 (2): 7–31. doi:10.3917/ess.027.0007. ISSN 1287-258X.
- Flavigny, Vincent (2012). "Histoire de l'autisme de Jacques Hochmann". Revue française de psychanalyse (in French). 76 (1): 211–222. doi:10.3917/rfp.761.0211. ISSN 0035-2942.
- Bentata, Hervé (2011). ""Fast-Com" et réseaux sociaux "Aspi". A propos du dernier livre de J.-C. Maleval, "L'autiste, son double et ses objets"". Cahiers de PréAut (in French). 8 (1): 159–161. doi:10.3917/capre.008.0157. ISSN 1767-3151.
- Grollier, Michel (2007). "L'autisme au xxie siècle…". Cliniques méditerranéennes (in French). 76 (2): 271–286. doi:10.3917/cm.076.0271. ISSN 0762-7491.
- "Autismes". La revue lacanienne (14 ed.). 2013. doi:10.3917/lrl.
  - Melman, Charles. "Dolto, reviens!". In Autismes (2013), pp. 7–9.
  - Laznik, Marie-Christine. "Lacan et l'autisme". In Autismes (2013), pp. 81-90.
- Janin-Duc, Dominique (2013). "La clinique des autismes et leurs contextes thérapeutiques, La revue lacanienne". La Revue Lacanienne (1 ed.). Érès. doi:10.3917/lrl.
- Bentata, Hervé (2013). "L'autisme aujourd'hui. Quelques vérités issues de l'histoire et de l'expérience". La revue lacanienne (in French). 14 (1): 63–66. doi:10.3917/lrl.131.0063. ISSN 1967-2055.

=== Articles published in scientific journals ===
- Durand, Christelle M; Betancur, Catalina; Boeckers, Tobias M; Bockmann, Juergen; Chaste, Pauline; Fauchereau, Fabien; Nygren, Gudrun; Rastam, Maria; Gillberg, I Carina; Anckarsäter, Henrik; Sponheim, Eili; Goubran-Botros, Hany; Delorme, Richard; Chabane, Nadia; Mouren-Simeoni, Marie-Christine (2007). "Mutations in the gene encoding the synaptic scaffolding protein SHANK3 are associated with autism spectrum disorders". Nature Genetics. 39 (1): 25–27. doi:10.1038/ng1933. ISSN 1061-4036. PMC 2082049. PMID 17173049.
- Golse, Bernard; Eliez, Stephan (2008). "À propos de l'autisme et des troubles envahissants du développement. Du processus autistisant à l'autisme de scanner...". La Psychiatrie de l'Enfant (50 ed.). La psychiatrie de l'enfant: CAIRN: 29–60. doi:10.3917/psye.
- Guillé, Jean-Marc (1 June 2008). "Politiques publiques, discours et pratiques professionnelles autour de l'autisme". Perspectives Psy (in French). 47 (2). EDK, Groupe EDP Sciences: 113–116. doi:10.1051/ppsy/2008472113. ISSN 0031-6032.
- Misès, Roger; Garret-Gloanec, Nicole; Coinçon, Yvonne (2012). "Classification de l'autisme et des psychoses précoces, plaidoyer pour des convergences". L'Information Psychiatrique (86 ed.). doi:10.3917/inpsy.
- Delion, Pierre (2001). "Le bébé à risque autistique". Devenir (13 ed.). doi:10.3917/dev.
- Sauvage, Dominique (2012). "Autisme, une brève histoire de la nosographie avec une archive de E. Seguin". Annales Médico-psychologiques, revue psychiatrique (in French). 170 (7): 510–516. doi:10.1016/j.amp.2012.06.018.
- De Guibert, Clément; Beaud, Laurence (2005). "Différence entre autisme et "psychose infantile": déficits d'unité vs d'identité de la situation?". La Psychiatrie de l'Enfant, Paris, Presses Universitaires de France. 2 (48).
- Maleval, Jean Claude; Grollier, Michel (2015). "Extension du spectre de l'autisme". L'Évolution Psychiatrique (in French). 80 (4): 764–781. doi:10.1016/j.evopsy.2014.05.011.
- Hérault, Marcel (1 October 2015). "La loi du 11 février 2005 a-t-elle modifié la situation des enfants ou adultes avec autisme ?". Perspectives Psy (in French). 54 (4): 374–378. doi:10.1051/ppsy/2015544374. ISSN 0031-6032.
- Pelloux, Anne-Sylvie; Chaffel, Boris (2008). "Éditorial.Le ccne se prononce sur l'autisme". Enfances & Psy (in French). 38 (1): 6–9. doi:10.3917/ep.038.0006. ISSN 1286-5559.
- Twain, Mark (2013). "Autisme chez les enfants et les adolescents: un faux consensus". Prescrire.
- Pelloux, Anne-Sylvie (2011). "L'autisme dans tous ses états. Champ de mines ou nouvelles fondations ?". Enfances & Psy (in French). 53 (4): 6–12. doi:10.3917/ep.053.0006. ISSN 1286-5559.
- Gravillon, Isabelle (2016). "La France peut mieux faire". L'École des parents (in French). 619 (2): 27–34. doi:10.3917/epar.619.0027. ISSN 0424-2238.
- Poirier, Nathalie; Cappe, Émilie (2016). "Les dispositifs scolaires québécois et français offerts aux élèves ayant un trouble du spectre de l'autisme". Bulletin de psychologie (in French). Numéro 544 (4): 267–278. doi:10.3917/bupsy.544.0267. ISSN 0007-4403.
- Morel, Stanislas (2016). "Troubles dans les apprentissages : neurosciences cognitives et difficultés scolaires". Revue européenne des sciences sociales. 54 (54–1): 221–247. doi:10.4000/ress.3526.
- Conrath, Patrick (2010). "Pierre Delion et l'autisme". Le Journal des psychologues. 277: 8–16.
- Chaumon, Christine (2009). "Henri Rey-Flaud, L'enfant qui s'est arrêté au seuil du langage. Comprendre l'autisme". Essaim (in French). 22 (1): 109–111. doi:10.3917/ess.022.0109. ISSN 1287-258X.
- Bonnot-Briey, Stéfany; Constant, Jacques (2009). "On ne peut pas parler de nous sans nous...". L'Information Psychiatrique (in French). 85 (9): 813–820. doi:10.1684/ipe.2009.0548. ISSN 0020-0204.
- Noël-Winderling, Myriam (2016). "2. Règne et déclin de la psychanalyse". La Vie de l'Enfant: 23–30.
- Horiot, Hugo (2013). "une enfance en autisme". Le Quotidien du médecin.
- Langloys, Danièle; Herault, Marcel; Gerhards, Vincent; Piloquet, Delphine (2012). "Déclaration du collectif Autisme". L'Information Psychiatrique. 87 (5): 421–422. doi:10.1684/ipe.2011.0800. ISSN 0020-0204.
- Ponnou, Sébastien; Fricard, Blandine (2017). "L'autisme dans la presse spécialisée destinée aux travailleurs sociaux : évolution des discours, enjeux de pratique, de recherche et de formation". Phronesis. 4 (3): 22–35. doi:10.7202/1035270ar.
- Gauvrit, Nicolas (2012). "Autisme et psychanalyse : une rhétorique d'esquive et de contradiction". Science et pseudo-sciences, Association française pour l'information scientifique.
- Méadel, Cécile (2006). "Le spectre " psy " réordonné par des parents d'enfant autiste. L'étude d'un cercle de discussion électronique". Politix (in French). 73 (1): 57–82. doi:10.3917/pox.073.0057. ISSN 0295-2319.
- Amaral, David (2011). "Against Le Packing: A Consensus Statement". Journal of the American Academy of Child & Adolescent Psychiatry. 50 (2): 191–192. doi:10.1016/j.jaac.2010.11.018. hdl:11380/708751. PMID 21241956.
- Spinney, Laura (2007). "Therapy for autistic children causes outcry in France". The Lancet. 370 (9588): 645–646. doi:10.1016/s0140-6736(07)61322-1. ISSN 0140-6736. PMID 17726792.
- Philip, Christine (2016). "Analyse d'une situation emblématique de l'autisme dans le cadre des réseaux sociaux (facebook) : l'affaire Rachel". La nouvelle revue de l'adaptation et de la scolarisation. 75.
- Bishop, D. V. M.; Swendsen, Joel (2020). "Psychoanalysis in the treatment of autism: why is France a cultural outlier?". BJPsych Bulletin. 45 (2): 89–93. doi:10.1192/bjb.2020.138. ISSN 2056-4694. PMC 8111966. PMID 33327979.
- Bates, Richard (2020). "France's Autism Controversy and the Historical Role of Psychoanalysis in the Diagnosis and Treatment of Autistic Children". Nottingham French Studies. 59 (2): 221–235. doi:10.3366/nfs.2020.0286. ISSN 0029-4586.
- Philip, Christine (2017). "Scolarisation des élèves avec autisme en France : trente ans d'histoire…". La nouvelle revue de l'adaptation et de la scolarisation (in French). 60 (4): 45–58. doi:10.3917/nras.060.0045. ISSN 1957-0341.
- Philip, Christine; Magerotte, Ghislain (2017). "L'autisme, une grande cause scolaire. Présentation du dossier". La nouvelle revue de l'adaptation et de la scolarisation (in French). 60 (4): 7–10. doi:10.3917/nras.060.0007. ISSN 1957-0341.
- Schovanec, Josef (2017b). "Réflexions sur la scolarisation des élèves autistes à partir d'une expérience". La nouvelle revue de l'adaptation et de la scolarisation (in French). 60 (4): 11–21. doi:10.3917/nras.060.0011. ISSN 1957-0341.
- Langloys, Danièle (2012). "Recommandations de bonnes pratiques et enjeux de la scolarisation d'un enfant autiste :. Un résultat en demi-teinte pour la HAS et l'ANESM". La nouvelle revue de l'adaptation et de la scolarisation (in French). 60 (4): 23–34. doi:10.3917/nras.060.0023. ISSN 1957-0341.
- Demailly, Lise (2019). "Le champ houleux de l'autisme en France au début du xxième siècle". SociologieS (in French). doi:10.4000/sociologies.9593. hdl:20.500.12210/33871.2. ISSN 1992-2655.
- Vallade, Florence (2015). "Autisme: l'écran des évidences éducatives". Éducation et sociétés (in French) (36 ed.): 39–49. doi:10.3917/es. ISSN 1782-1428.

=== Association sources ===
- Fombonne, Éric (2016). "Tendances actuelles dans l'épidémiologie de l'autisme". conférence donnée pendant le congrès annuel d'Autisme France.
- Cattan, Olivia (2014). "Pour faire valoir le droit des personnes autistes et faire reculer les préjugés" (PDF). SOS Autisme France. Archived from the original (PDF) on 15 June 2007.
- Langloys, Danièle (2006). "Du bon usage du mot autisme".
- Autisme France (2014). "Autisme France: 25 ans de lutte au service des personnes autistes" (PDF). Archived from the original (PDF) on 30 November 1998.
- Collectif autisme (2017). "Présentation du collectif". Archived from the original on 20 June 2024.
- Comité consultatif national d'autistes de France (2017). "Présentation CCNAF". Archived from the original on 7 October 2022.

=== French-speaking media ===
==== L'Express ====
- L'Express (1997). "Les oubliés de la santé". L'Express.
- Sajidi, M'hammed (2013). "Le packing humaniste, ou l'ultime paradoxe du Pr Delion". L'Express.

==== Le Figaro ====
- AFP (2008). "Le PS dénonce 'l'autisme' de Fillon". Le Figaro.
- Le Figaro (2016). "Je suis à l'Est ! Savant et autiste : un témoignage unique". Le Figaro. Archived from the original on 27 March 2019.
- Fréour, Pauline (2016). "L'éclosion à la vie d'une autiste qui s'ignorait". Le Figaro.
- Piquet, Caroline (2014). "Ces enfants handicapés obligés de s'exiler de France pour aller à l'école". Le Figaro.

==== Le Monde ====
- Picard, Nathalie (2016). "Frédérique Bonnet-Brilhault, chercheuse en l'âme". Le Monde.
- Cabut, Sandrine (2012b). "Un diurétique réduit l'isolement des autistes". Le Monde.
- Mottron, Laurent (2012). "Autisme : une mise en garde contre la méthode ABA". Le Monde.
- Vincent, Catherine (2014). "Le Mur, la psychanalyse à l'épreuve de l'autisme "à nouveau libre de diffusion"". Le Monde.
- Luciani, Noémie (2016). "Dernières nouvelles du cosmos: une Pythie dans une bouée". Le Monde.
- Sotinel, Thoma (2015). "Le Goût des merveilles: un cousin de Rain Man dans les vergers". Le Monde.
- Cabut, Sandrine (2012). "Josef Schovanec, ambassadeur hors normes". Le Monde.
- Ramus, Franck (2012). "Peut-il y avoir une exception française en médecine?". Le Monde.

==== Libération ====
- Labat, Hélène Suarez (2015). Les autismes et leurs évolutions: Apports des méthodes projectives. Psycho Sup. ISBN 978-2100741663.
- Favereau, Éric (2016). "L'autisme est un symptôme, ce n'est pas une maladie". Libération.
- Baghdadli, Amaria; Beuzon, Stéphane; Bursztejn, Claude; Constant, Jacques; Desguerre, Isabelle; Rogé, Bernadette; Squillante, Maria; Voisin, Jean; Aussilloux, Charles (2008), "Le diagnostic précoce de l'autisme en France", Améliorer la qualité de vie des personnes atteintes d'autisme, Santé Social (in French), Paris: Dunod, pp. 29–38, doi:10.3917/dunod.roge.2009.01.0029
- Durand, Jacky (2000). "Le jeûne d'une mère pour son enfant qui n'était qu'un cri". Libération.
- Maudet, Elsa (2015). "Les placements abusifs d'enfants autistes, le scandale qui monte". Libération.

==== Others ====
- Le Point (2016). "Autisme : un texte anti-psychanalyse rejeté par l'Assemblée". Le Point.
- Jourdan, Camille (2017). "Comment " autiste " est devenu le nouveau " trisomique "". State.
- Roquelle, Sophie (2015). "Non, "autiste" n'est pas une insulte, c'est un handicap!". L'Opinion.
- Daniel, Gilles (2015). "Nous ne sommes pas des autistes" : la présidente de SOS Autisme dénonce un "dérapage" de Pujadas". LCI.
- Montalivet, Hortense de (2017). "Les associations d'autisme furieuses contre Vanessa Burggraf après ses propos dans "ONPC"". Le Huffington Post. Archived from the original on 6 March 2017.
- AFP, Agence France Presse (2017). "Fillon suscite une polémique pour avoir répété qu'il "n'est pas autiste"". Sciences et avenir.
- Loumé, Lise (2017). ""Les politiques ne maîtrisent pas toujours la violence symbolique de leur langage"". Sciences et avenir.
- Legrand, Christine (2017). "Catherine Barthélémy, défricheuse de l'autisme". La Croix.
- Mammar, Rezki (2017). "Penelope Fillon engagée en faveur des personnes autistes et Asperger". Vivre FM.
- S. M. (2016). "Audiences TV: belle performance pour la soirée autisme de France 2". Le Parisien.
- Didier, Arthur (2012). ""Shameful", la honte, le documentaire choc réalisé Alex Plank et Noah Trevino sur l'autisme en France". Vivre FM. Archived from the original on 29 March 2024.
- Le Parisien (2018). "Monsieur je-sais-tout: une belle rencontre". Le Parisien.
- Bornais, Marie-France (2017). "Candidat aux élections présidentielles en France". Le Journal de Québec.
- Horiot, Hugo (2015). "Autisme: la psychanalyse est "nocive"". TF1.
- France Culture (2016). "Je suis musicien autiste". France Culture.

=== Other references ===
- Barthélémy, Catherine (2013). "Dossier d'information : Autisme". Inserm. Archived from the original on 15 June 2007.
- Inserm (2012). "Autisme : des mutations génétiques perturbent la communication entre les neurones". Inserm. Archived from the original on 28 March 2024.
- Institut Pasteur (2013). "Autisme". Institut Pasteur.
- Secrétariat d'État auprès du Premier ministre chargé des Personnes handicapées (2018). "L'autisme en 2018: les chiffres clés – Secrétariat d'État auprès du Premier ministre chargé des Personnes handicapées". Secrétariat d'État auprès du Premier ministre chargé des Personnes handicapées. Archived from the original on 28 March 2024.
- Ramus, Franck (2013). "Lettre ouverte à la revue Prescrire". Pour la science. Archived from the original on 22 December 2016.
- Présidence de la République (2017). "Lancement du 4e plan autisme à l'Élysée". www.elysee.fr. Archived from the original on 28 March 2024.
- Simon, Véronique (10 January 2019). "Bilan et intervention précoce pour l'autisme et les troubles du neuro-développement". Secrétariat d'État auprès du Premier ministre chargé des Personnes handicapées. Archived from the original on 27 September 2020.
- Dal'Secco, Emmanuelle (2019). "Rapport Onu et handicap: la France en prend pour son grade!". Handicap.fr.
- M-CHAT (2015). "M-CHAT: Version française" (PDF). mchatscreen.
- Dictionnaire Larousse (2017). "autisme". Dictionnaire Larousse fr.
- RMC (8 February 2019). "VIDÉO – ne plus utiliser les autistes comme une insulte: Estelle interpelle Emmanuel Macron". RMC.
- CNSA (2023). "Les chiffres clé de l'aide à l'autonomie" (PDF). CNSA.
- Council of Europe (2014). "Communiqué sur la 5e condamnation de la France par le Conseil de l'Europe" (PDF). Autisme France.
- Huy, Tâm Tran (2016). "Autisme: le retard français". publicsenat.fr. Archived from the original on 15 June 2007.
- Bates, Richard (2018). "La France a un problème avec l'autisme, et c'est en partie à cause de Françoise Dolto". Slate.fr.
- Alliance Autiste (2015). "Rapport alternatif au Comité des Droits de l'Enfant de l'ONU au sujet de la France". Base de données relative aux organes conventionnels de l'ONU.
- Associations Alliance Autiste et CLE Autistes (2019). "Questions d'associations d'autistes pour l'Etat français au sujet de l'application de la Convention relative aux Droits des Personnes Handicapées". Base de données relative aux organes conventionnels de l'ONU (Haut-Commissariat aux Droits de l'Homme des Nations Unies).
- Pignard, Magali (2016). "AFFA – Association Francophone de Femmes Autistes, pour donner de la visibilité aux femmes/filles autistes". The autist. Archived from the original on 15 June 2007.
- Internet Movie Database (2017). "Elle s'appelle Sabine". Internet Movie Database.
- Allociné (2017). "Le Goût des merveilles- secrets de tournage". Allociné.
- Allociné (2020). "Hors Normes". Allociné.
- Dachez, Julie (2018). Dans ta bulle !. Vanves: Marabout. ISBN 978-2-501-12911-4.
- Cheng, Maria (2012). "Associated Press, "French autistic kids mostly get psychotherapy"". USA Today. Archived from the original on 28 March 2024.
