= Julie Dachez =

French disability rights advocate

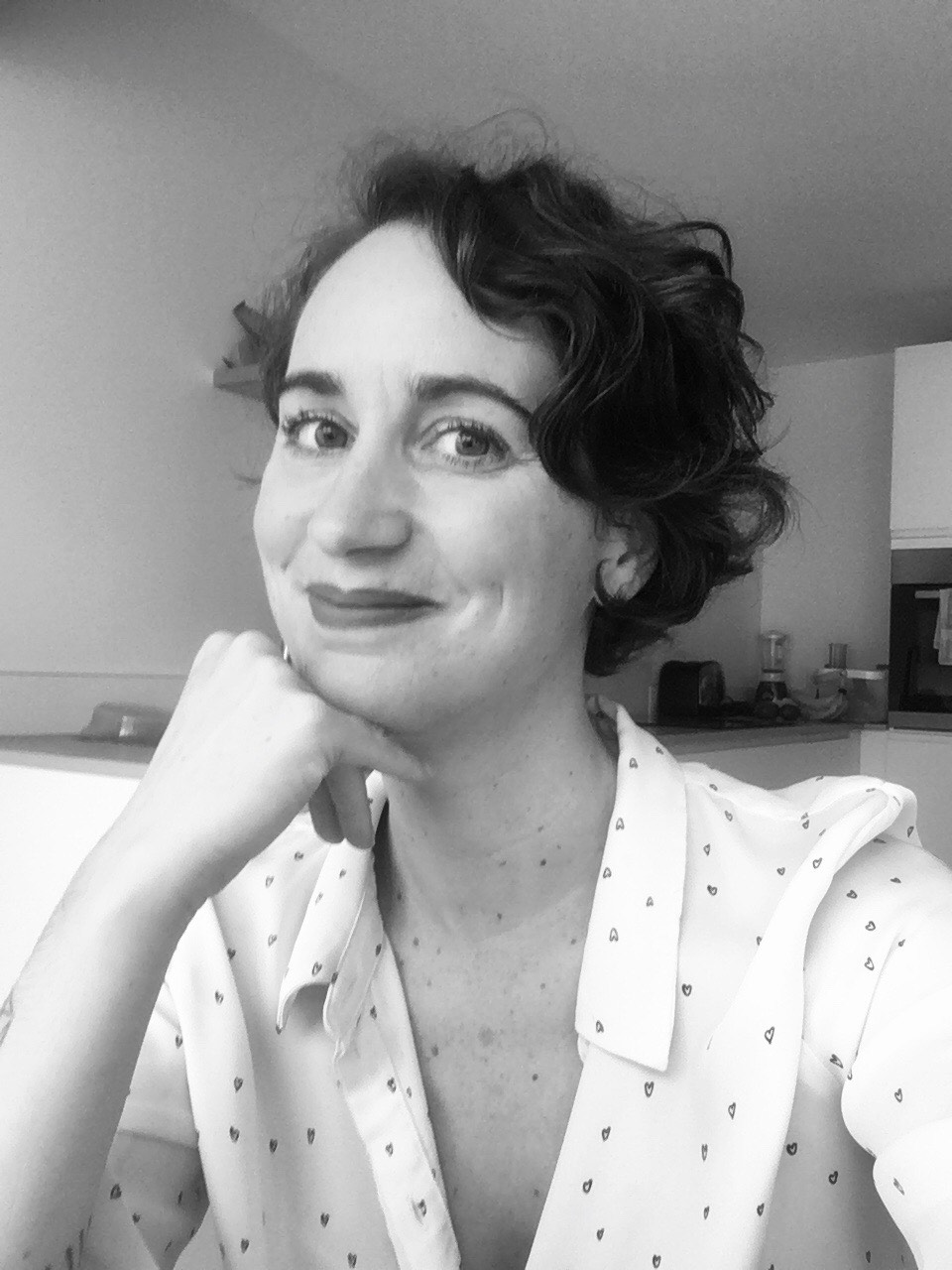
- Dachez in 2020
- Born: 5 February 1985 (age 41)
- Other name: Super Pépette
- Occupations: Social psychologist, lecturer, autism activist

Julie Dachez (French pronunciation: [ʒyli daʃe]; born 5 February 1985) is a French social psychologist, lecturer and autistic rights activist. She's the author of Invisible Differences and Dans ta bulle! ('In your dreams!'). In 2016, she became the first openly autistic person to defend a thesis on the subject in France.

== Biography ==
Dachez studied at a business school and worked for four years in the private sector. In 2012, she was diagnosed with the now-defunct autism subtype Asperger syndrome at an Autism Resource Center. She then incorporated her autistic identity into her work by creating a blog, making videos on YouTube and embarking on a doctoral programme in social psychology focusing on autism. In 2016, she became the first openly autistic person to defend a thesis on this subject in France, Envisager l'autisme autrement: une approche psychosociale ('Seeing autism differently: a psychosocial approach').

== Positions on autism ==
Dachez sees autism as "a difference in functioning pathologised by a society obsessed with normality", which she sees from a social and non-medical point of view, mainly in terms of the stigmatisation and discrimination suffered by autistic people. She argues that she suffers more from other people's prejudices about autism and the inadequacy of social structures and its needs than from the fact that she is herself autistic. She believes that the specific behaviours of autistic people are related to coping strategies.

She describes autism in women as a "double sentence", due to the gender bias associated with the more subtle manifestations of autism in women and the fact that the diagnostic criteria for autism were developed by observing male autistics, leading to diagnostic errors in women. She has also criticized the lack of knowledge in France about autism, especially about Asperger syndrome in women.

== Activities ==
Dachez has published two books on the subject of autism. The first one, La Différence invisible (released as Invisible Differences in English), is an autobiographical comic co-written with Mademoiselle Caroline. It received favorable reviews, as much for its didactical value as for its narrative and aesthetic treatment.

Her second book, Dans ta bulle! ('In your bubble'), prefaced by Josef Schovanec, focuses on the personal testimonies of autistic people that Dachez collected while writing her thesis.

Dachez has lectured on the subject of autism and spoken out against the prejudice autistic people face. In this context, she spoke at a World Autism Awareness Day observance in 2018. During the following year's observance, she represented the organization PEP 12 (Pupils in Public Education).

== Bibliography ==
- Julie Dachez (ill. Mademoiselle Caroline), Invisible Differences (French: La Différence invisible, The Invisible Difference), Paris, Delcourt, coll. « Mirages », 2016, 196 p. ISBN 978-2-7560-7267-8.
- Julie Dachez, Dans ta bulle ! (In your bubble !), Vanves, Marabout, 2018, 256 p. ISBN 978-2-501-12911-4.

== Publications ==
- Julie Dachez, André N'Dobo et Oscar Navarro Carrascal, « Représentation sociale de l'autisme », Les Cahiers Internationaux de Psychologie Sociale, vol. 4, n^{o} 112, 2016, p. 477-500
- Julie Dachez, Andre Ndobo et Anaïs Ameline, « French Validation of the Multidimensional Attitude Scale Toward Persons with Disabilities (MAS) : The case of Attitudes Toward Autism and Their Moderating Factors », Journal of Autism and Developmental Disorders, vol. 45, n^{o} 8, août 2015, p. 2508–2518.
