= Invisible Differences =

Graphic novel by Julie Dachez

Invisible Differences (La Différence invisible)

Creative team
- Writer: Julie Dachez
- Artist: Mademoiselle Caroline

Original publication
- Date of publication: 2016
- Language: French
- ISBN: 9782756072678

Translation
- Publisher: Oni Press
- Date: October 20, 2020
- ISBN: 9781620107669
- Translator: Edward Gauvin

Invisible Differences: A Story of Asperger's, Adulting, and Living a Life in Full Color is a graphic novel written by Julie Dachez and illustrated by Mademoiselle Caroline. It follows a young French woman who is diagnosed with autism as an adult, based on Dachez's own experiences. Originally published in 2016 in French as "La Différence invisible", an English translation by Edward Gauvin was published in 2020 by Oni Press.

== Summary ==
Marguerite, a woman in her 20s living in Paris, has always struggled with social communication and feels exhausted trying to fit into society. After researching on the internet, she learns about autism, and is diagnosed with Asperger’s syndrome (a now-retired diagnosis under the autism spectrum) partway through the story.

== Development ==
The character of Marguerite's experiences were inspired by Dachez's own; Dachez was diagnosed with Asperger’s syndrome at the age of 27 in 2012.

== Reception ==
Publishers Weekly described Caroline's art as having "delightfully loose, loopy style, reminiscent of Julia Wertz," and concluded that "this soulful and serious look at Asperger’s syndrome brings an informed and optimistic perspective to the fore."

In a starred review, School Library Journal commented on Caroline's use of color to support the storyline, saying "a monochrome palette gives way to warm or cool tones; pops of red start small, become overwhelming, then finally symbolize Marguerite's positive new outlook"

Peter Dabbene of Foreword Reviews noted the inclusion of additional details including as a lists of facts and tips for managing autism, as well as a history of the diagnosis. Dabbene described the book as a "honest, enlightening, and inspirational graphic treatment of a serious subject."

John Seven of The Beat gave particular attention to how the narrative portrayed the realities of autism in France specifically, noting how "many of the reactions that Marguerite faces... [are] grounded in a culture that lacks awareness due to a high level of denial."

The English translation was nominated for the 2021 Eisner Award for Best Reality-Based Work. It was also included in the top ten on the 2022 Graphic Novels & Comics Round Table's Best Graphic Novels for Adults. In 2019, the Japanese translation Mienai Chigai: Watashi wa Asperger won a New Face Award at the 22nd Japan Media Arts Festival.
