= The Wall (2011 film) =

2011 film by Sophie Robert

- Directed by: Sophie Robert
- Release date: 8 September 2011
- Country: France
- Language: French

The Wall (French: Le Mur) is a documentary film made in 2011 by Sophie Robert about autism and psychoanalysis, which became the subject of a court case in France. The alternative full name of the film is The Wall or psychoanalysis put to the test on autism.

The film considers the question whether psychoanalysis is a suitable treatment for autism. The film argues that while the rest of the world considers autism as a neurological disorder caused by anomalies in a specific area of the brain, in France concepts of the condition remain dominated by psychoanalysis, which sees autism as a form of psychosis caused by difficulties in subjective relationships and ultimately caused by the actions of the mother. The film relies on extensive interviews with 11 French psychoanalysts in order to tease out the details of their beliefs, which the film contrasts with the progress made by children who follow other, behavioural, approaches to improving autistic children's ability to communicate. The film argues that the psychoanalytic approach to autism is based on ignorance and misogyny and leads to harmful consequences for autistic children who fall under the care of psychoanalysts. The film ends with Robert asking the psychoanalysts what an autistic child can realistically expect to gain from a psychoanalytic therapy; the psychoanalysts interviewed are shown not to be able to answer this question coherently.

Three of the psychoanalysts interviewed in the film sued Ms Robert. The three plaintiffs (Eric Laurent, Esthela Solano, and Alexandre Stevens) expressed the view that they hold intellectual property rights to the footage filmed by Ms Roberts and that she edited it without their consent and thus distorted their comments.

The court (Lille Regional Court) found against Robert thus banning the film.

However this ban was overturned by a court of appeal in 2014. The appeal court found that while Robert may have misled the psychoanalysts as to the editorial line her film would take, she had not materially misrepresented their views in her editing of the footage. As of 2016 the film is available for viewing online.
