= Josef Schovanec =

French autism activist

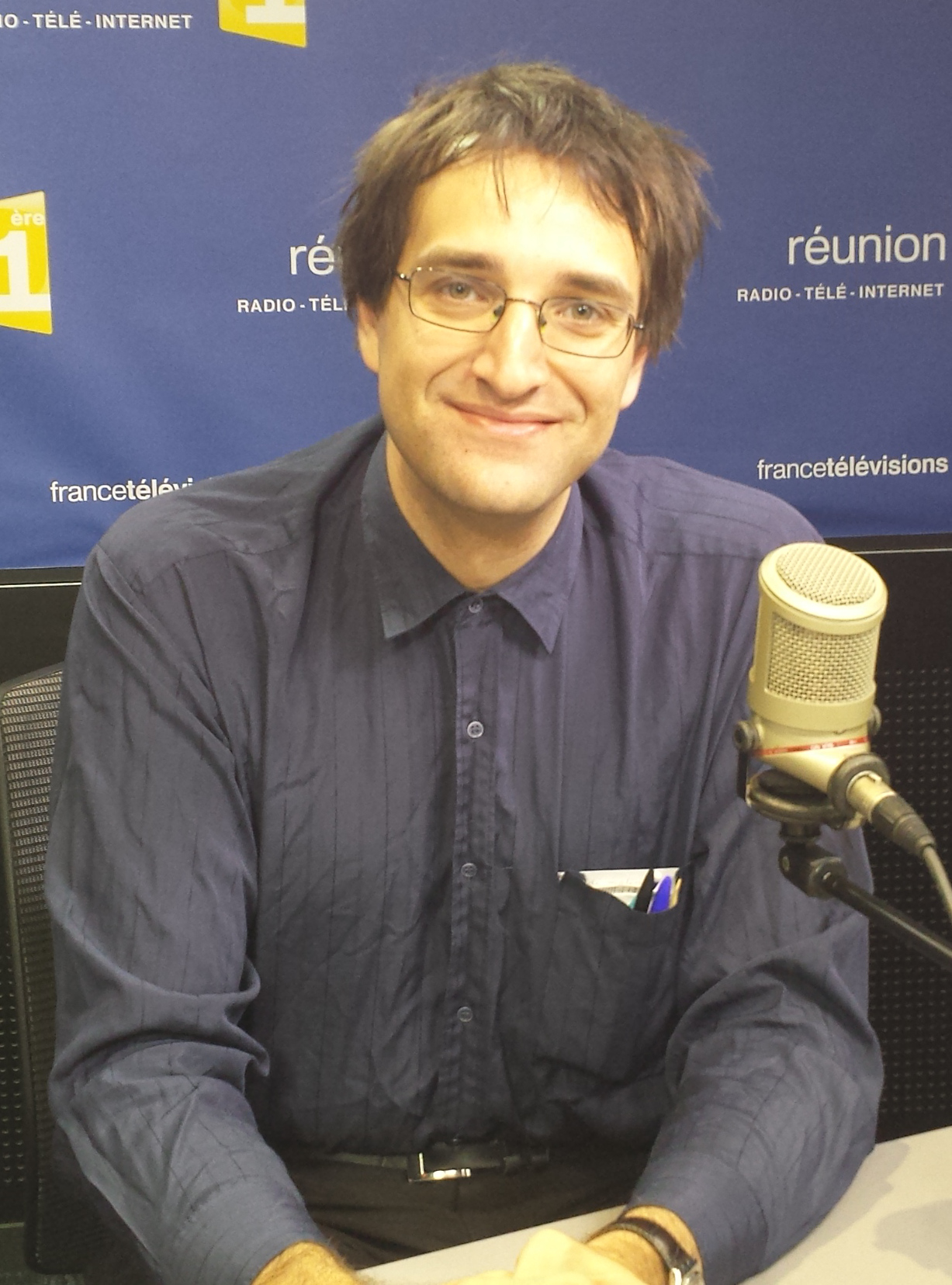
- Schovanec in 2016
- Born: December 2, 1981 (age 44); Charenton-le-Pont, Île-de-France, France
- Occupations: Writer, philosopher, translator, autism activist

Josef Schovanec (born in Charenton-le-Pont on 2 December 1981), is a French philosopher, writer, translator and autistic activist.

He is a polyglot, and the author of several books, including his autobiography Je suis à l'Est!. He has been giving talks on autism in France since 2007, becoming one of the leading autism figures in the country.

== Early life and education ==
Schovanec was born in Charenton-le-Pont, near Paris, into a family of Czech immigrants.

He defended a doctoral dissertation at the School for Advanced Studies in the Social Sciences in 2009, under the supervision of Heinz Wismann.

== Career ==
Schovanec became publicly known in France through lectures, books and media appearances addressing autism and cultural differences.

From 2014, he contributed a recurring segment titled Voyage en Autistan on Europe 1.

In 2018, he received the audiovisual prize of the Association Planète Albert-Kahn.

Schovanec also appears in the weekly program La chronique atypique on KTO TV.

He has been credited as part of the cast of the French television series Vestiaires broadcast by France Télévisions.

== Sources ==
- Tager, Djénane Kareh (June–July 2014). "Josef Schovanec : "Être comme vous est un combat"". Nouvelles Clés (in French): 96-97.
