= Societal and cultural aspects of autism =

Societal and cultural aspects of autism or sociology of autism come into play with recognition of autism, approaches to its support services and therapies, and how autism affects the definition of personhood.

The autistic community is divided primarily into two camps: the autism rights movement and the pathology paradigm. The pathology paradigm advocates for supporting research into therapies, treatments, or a cure to help minimize or remove autistic traits, seeing treatment as vital to help individuals with autism, while the neurodiversity movement believes autism should be seen as a different way of being and advocates against a cure and interventions that focus on normalization (but do not oppose interventions that emphasize acceptance, adaptive skills building, or interventions that aim to reduce intrinsically harmful traits, behaviors, or conditions), seeing it as trying to exterminate autistic people and their individuality.

While the dominant paradigm is the pathology paradigm and is followed largely by autism research and scientific communities, the neurodiversity movement is highly popular among most autistic people, within autism advocacy, autism rights organizations, and related neurodiversity approaches have been rapidly growing and applied in the autism research field in the last few years.

There are many autism-related events and celebrations; including World Autism Awareness Day, Autism Sunday and Autistic Pride Day, and notable people have spoken about being autistic or are thought to be or have been autistic. Autism is diagnosed more frequently in males than in females.

== Terminology ==
The full name for autism is autism spectrum disorder, abbreviated to ASD. Although some prefer to use the person-first terminology (person with autism), other members of the autistic community prefer identity-first terminology, such as autistic person or autistic, emphasising that autism is a part of their identity rather than a disease they have. In addition, phrases like suffers from autism are objectionable to many people.

The autistic community has developed a number of commonly used terms, such as:

- Aspie – a person with Asperger syndrome.
- Autie or Autist – an autistic person. It can be contrasted with aspie to refer to those specifically diagnosed with classic autism or another autism spectrum disorder.
- Autistics and cousins – a cover term including aspies, auties, and their "cousins", i.e. people with some autistic traits but no formal diagnosis.
- Curebie – a person with the desire to cure autism. This term is highly derogatory.
- Neurodiversity – tolerance of people regardless of neurological makeup.
- Neurotypical – a person who does not have any developmental or neurological disorders. Often used to describe an individual who is not autistic.
- Allistic – a person who is not autistic but may or may not be neurodivergent in other ways, for example, a dyslexic person, or someone with ADHD. Originally and commonly, however, it is used satirically to describe those without autism.

== Overview ==
=== Autistic adults ===
Communication and social problems often cause difficulties in many areas of an autistic adult's life. A 2008 study found that autistic adults commonly experience difficulty starting social interactions, a longing for greater intimacy, a profound sense of isolation, and effort to develop greater social or self-awareness.

A much smaller proportion of adult autistics marry than the general population. It has been hypothesized that autistic people are subject to assortative mating; they tend to pair with each other and raise autistic offspring. This hypothesis has been publicized in the popular press and is supported by empirical evidence. Out of eleven conditions assessed in one study, participants with autism spectrum disorder exhibited the highest rates of assortative mating.

British psychologist Simon Baron-Cohen said that an increasingly technological society has opened up niches for people with Asperger syndrome, who may choose fields that are "highly systematised and predictable". People with AS could do well in workplace roles that are "system-centered, and connect with the nitty-gritty detail of the product or the system".

=== Autistic savants ===
An autistic savant is an autistic person with extreme talent in one or more areas of study. Although there is a common association between savant syndrome and autism (an association made popular by the 1988 film Rain Man), most autistic people are not savants and savantism is not unique to autistic people, though there does seem to be some relation. One in ten autistic people may have notable abilities, but prodigious savants like Stephen Wiltshire are very rare; only about 100 such people have been described/identified in the century since savants were first identified, and there are only about 25 living identified prodigious savants worldwide.

=== Gender aspects ===
==== Autistic women ====
Historically, autism was thought of as a condition mostly affecting males. Some studies found that males were up to four times more likely than females to be diagnosed as autistic and among those with Asperger syndrome or "high-functioning autism", males were up to ten times more likely to be diagnosed. This may be due to the fact that many of the diagnostic tools used to diagnose autism have been crafted through the observation of autistic males and are therefore more likely to identify autistic men and boys than their female counterparts. To date, the research and support surrounding autistic people has been male-centric; women and non-binary people are seriously underrepresented.

For many autistic women, the lack of diagnosis or a late diagnosis results in them missing out on supports and interventions that are most valuable when implemented at a younger age. For those females who do receive a diagnosis and are provided with those supports, they often have to face the fact that many of them have been created with males in mind and may not acknowledge the physical, psychological, and societal differences that females face.

Some autistic women find themselves misdiagnosed with personality disorders, such as borderline personality disorder, avoidant personality disorder and schizoid personality disorder. Autistic females are "research orphans" according to Yale's Ami Klin; some drugs used to treat anxiety or hyperactivity that may accompany autism are rarely tested on autistic females. Autism may express differently, with many autistic females presenting more subtly than males and may be more adept at developing more sophisticated social masking behaviors. As such, females with more prominent difficulties are more likely to be diagnosed than those who present more neurotypically or exhibit masking behavior. Autistic females are more likely to develop a more sophisticated social camouflage for a variety of reasons. One theory as to why is that women as a whole face more complex social expectations than men, creating a greater need to "prepare more thoroughly for social situations, or risk ostracism".

Another theory suggests that autistic women have a more inborn need for social interaction than their male counterparts, leading many women and girls to be more invested in creating social camouflage strategies. These strategies are developed in a variety of ways such as observing and copying the social interactions of those around them as well as creating strategies to attempt to "go undetected". These coping mechanisms can take an immense amount of time and energy to learn and practice and can, as Shana Nicols states, "more often than not lead to exhaustion, withdrawal, anxiety, selective mutism, and depression". Women may be more concerned with how they are viewed by peers and the failure to connect with people outside of their immediate family could lead to severe anxiety or clinical depression. Autistic girls who have "normal" intelligence may be more socially disadvantaged than males because of the "rising level of social interaction that comes in middle school", when girls' "friendships often hinge on attention to feelings and lots of rapid and nuanced communication".

Autistic girls may suffer additionally by being placed in specialized educational programs, where they will be surrounded by males and further isolated from female social contacts. Autistic women and girls often "internalize feelings of frustration and failure" and are believed to have higher rates of certain comorbidities such as anxiety and depression (36 and 34 percent respectively), due in large part to the desire for along with the difficulties in finding social inclusion along with other social and sensory challenges. Lack of diagnosis can also lead autistic women to have higher rates of depression, anxiety, and self-esteem issues as they are left without a clear understanding as to why they do not "fit in" with their peers. Autistic females also seem to have higher rates of eating disorders, such as anorexia, than non-autistic females. This may be related to social isolation and elevated levels of anxiety along with a need to control their environment more fully, although a complicating factor which is just being explored in the scientific literature is that functional disorders of eating and digestion such as IBS, GERD, food allergies, gastroparesis et al., as well as sensory issues common in autistic people generally, may contribute heavily to "disordered eating" behavior which is physical, sensory, allergic, or pain-related rather than psychological.

Although all autistic people have a higher risk of experiencing bullying, these experiences often present differently based on gender. Although sample sizes are too small to draw firm conclusions, one study suggests that autistic women are less likely than males over the long term to marry, have families, go to college, have careers, and live independently. An intense interest in specific topics (also called a special interest) plays a significant factor in the lives of autistic people. Autistic females may focus on different topics than their male counterparts. For this reason, females' special interests may be overlooked as they may not be specifically associated with male autistic culture. For example, a 2008 The New York Times article indicated that autistic females rarely have interests in numbers or have stores of specialized knowledge.

All autistic people experience the same or similar core symptoms, but when affected by ideas of gender and gender roles, the autistic traits may manifest differently and lead to different experiences for females and males. The profile of autism may change as more women are diagnosed, which will lead to further medical understanding. There may be current lacks in understanding because autistic females may go undiagnosed.

=== Gender identity and sexual orientation ===
In recent years (as of 2022), research has suggested overlap between people with autism and a non-heterosexual identity (with autistic people more likely to be identified as homosexual, bisexual or asexual) as well as an overlap with a transgender identity. It is currently unclear whether this correlation exists due to any innate characteristic of autism that may also cause unusual discrepancies in sex or gender, or whether it is the result of exposing a group of people who experience difficulty in (or resistance to) abidance with social norms, including those related to gender, to sexism and gender stereotypes.

=== Relationships with animals ===
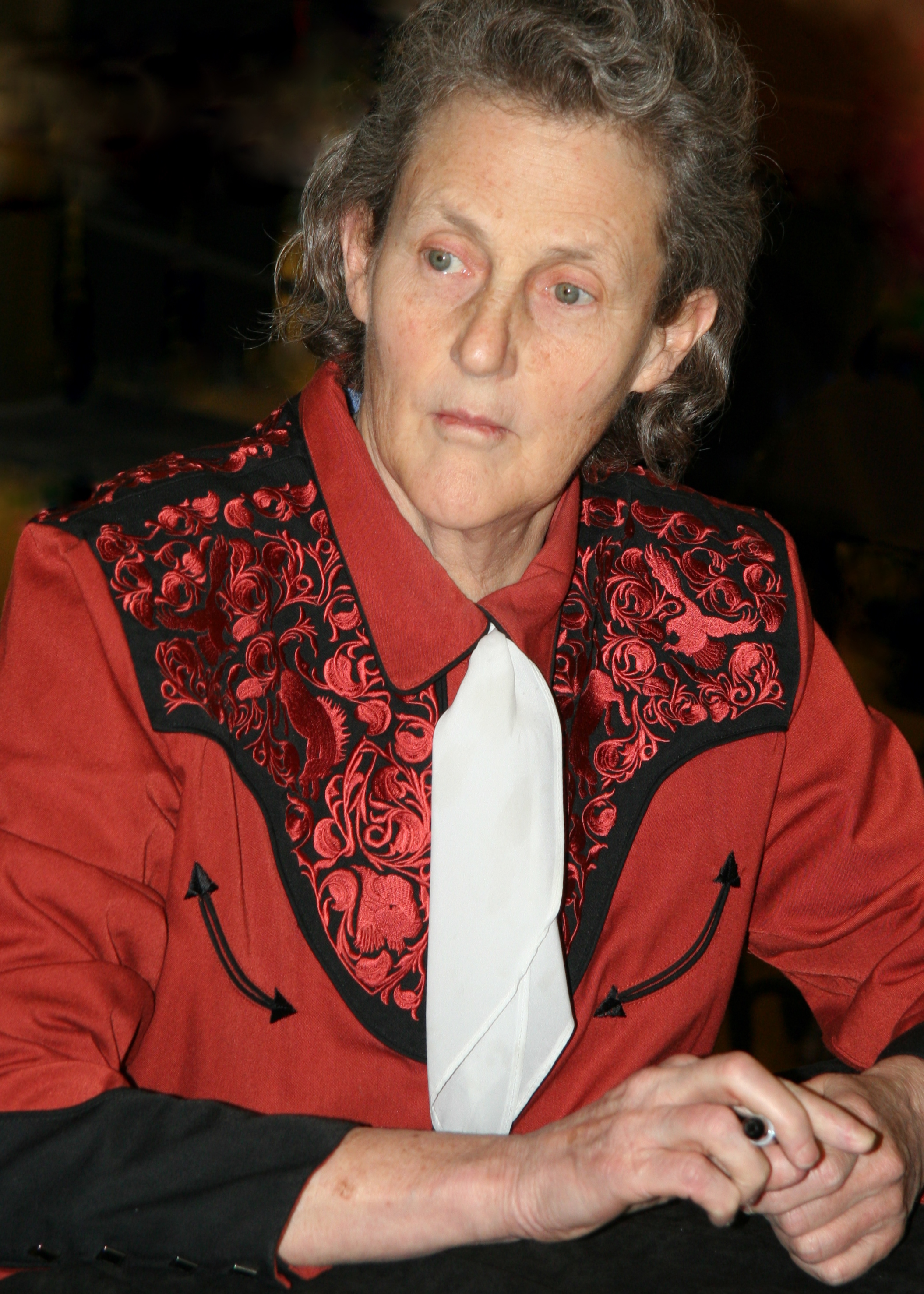
Temple Grandin

Temple Grandin, autistic designer of cattle handling systems, said that one reason she can easily figure out how a cow would react is because autistic people can easily "think the way that animals think". According to Grandin, animals do not have "complex emotions such as shame or guilt" and they do not think in language. She says that, although not everything about animals is like an autistic person, the similarity is that they think visually and without language. She says people do not make this connection because the study of autism and the study of animal behavior are parallel disciplines involving different individuals. Despite these similarities, the degree to which autistic individuals can be said to think like animals remains undetermined; non-human animals, as well as humans, have evolved cognitive specializations that may or may not share characteristics with other species.

Dawn Prince-Hughes, diagnosed with Asperger's, describes her observations of gorillas in Songs of the Gorilla Nation.

== Autism and interpersonal relationships ==
Difficulties in social interaction and relationships are core signs of autism, meaning that maintaining Interpersonal relationships can be difficult for autistic people.

=== Social impact ===
Autism may lead to problems in social interaction with peers. These problems can be severe or mild depending on the individual. Autistic individuals are often the target of bullying at school due to their idiosyncratic behavior, precise language, unusual interests, and impaired ability to perceive and respond in socially expected ways to nonverbal cues, particularly in interpersonal conflict, which results in them being sought out by classmates and rejected. Autistic people may communicate more literally and have difficulty interpreting and responding to sarcasm, banter, or metaphorical speech. Difficulties with social interaction may also manifest in a lack of play with other children.

Many autistic people desire to be social but experience difficulty in social communication and fail to socialize successfully, sometimes leading to withdrawal and asocial behavior, especially in adolescence. At this stage of life, young autistic people may be at risk of inappropriate friendships and social groups. People with autism may also interact better with those considerably older or younger than themselves, rather than those within their own age group.

Those who may have been diagnosed with Asperger syndrome in the past often display advanced abilities for their age in language, reading, mathematics, spatial skills, or music—sometimes into the "gifted" range—but this may be counterbalanced by considerable delays in other developmental areas, like verbal and nonverbal communication or some lack of motor coordination. This combination of traits can lead to problems with teachers and other authority figures. An autistic child might be regarded by teachers as a "problem child" or a "poor performer". The child's extremely low tolerance for what they perceive to be ordinary and mundane tasks, such as typical homework assignments, can easily become frustrating; a teacher may well consider the child arrogant, spiteful, and insubordinate. Lack of support and understanding, in combination with the child's anxieties, can result in problematic behavior (such as severe tantrums, violent and angry outbursts, and withdrawal).

Employment of autistic people may be difficult. The impaired social skills can be likely to interfere with the interview process—and people with often superior skills can be passed over due to these conflicts with interviewers. Once hired, autistic people may continue to have difficulty with interpersonal communications. Homelessness is very common among autistic people.

While some researchers have suggested that autistic individuals are less likely to self-enhance their reputation compared to those without autism, others argue that autistic individuals do not have less of a desire for self-enhancement than non-autistic individuals.

Autistic people are known to have difficulty interacting with law enforcement. The blue envelope program has been developed to assist autistic drivers.

=== Difficulties in relationships ===
Two traits sometimes found in autistic individuals are mind-blindness (the inability to predict the beliefs and intentions of others) and alexithymia (the inability to identify and interpret emotional signals in oneself or others), which reduce the ability to be empathetically attuned to others. Alexithymia in autism functions as an independent variable relying on different neural networks than those implicated in theory of mind (ToM). In fact, a lack of theory of mind in autistics may be a result of a lack of information available to the mind due to the operation of the alexithymic deficit.

A second issue related to alexithymia involves the inability to identify and modulate strong emotions such as sadness or anger, which leaves the individual prone to "sudden affective outbursts such as crying or rage". According to Tony Attwood, the inability to express feelings using words may also predispose the individual to use physical acts to articulate the mood and release the emotional energy.

Autistic people report a feeling of being detached against their will from the world around them ("on the outside looking in"). They may have difficulty finding a life partner or getting married due to poor social skills. The complexity and inconsistency of the social world can pose an extreme challenge for autistic individuals. In the UK, Asperger syndrome is covered by the Disability Discrimination Act; autistics who get treated badly because of it may have some redress. The first case was Hewett v Motorola 2004 (sometimes referred to as Hewitt) and the second was Isles v Ealing Council. The same applies in the United States with the Americans with Disabilities Act, amended in 2008 to include autism spectrum disorders.

The intense focus and tendency to work things out logically often grants autistic people a high level of ability in their field of interest. When these special interests coincide with a materially or socially useful task, an autistic person can lead a profitable career and a fulfilled life. A child obsessed with a specific topic area may succeed in employment related to that area.

According to Elizabeth Fein, the dynamic of role-playing games is especially positive and attractive to autistic people. The social information exchanged in these games is explicit, top-down and systematic, and the games follow a set of shared abstract rules. Baez and Rattazzi showed that interpreting the implicit social information of daily life is difficult for autistics.

Despite the fact that autistic individuals are commonly known to lack theory of mind, recent research has suggested that theory of mind may be not only present in autistics individuals but also act differently compared to neurotypicals as suggested in the double empathy problem. Autistic theory of mind is simply based on the use of rules and logic. It is also suggested that autistic people can understand and predict the thoughts and motivations of each other better than neurotypicals can, and autistic interactions may display even greater social signals of shared enjoyment, ease, and rapport when interacting. This means autistic individuals present mind-blindness and alexithymia towards neurotypicals and vice versa due to bidirectional differences in communication style as well as a reciprocal lack of understanding since the two neurotypes clash.

== Autism rights movement ==
The autism rights movement is a social movement within the context of disability rights that emphasizes the concept of neurodiversity, viewing the autism spectrum as a result of natural variations in the human brain rather than a disorder/disease to be cured. The ARM advocates a variety of goals, including greater acceptance of autistic behaviors; therapies that focus on coping skills rather than imitating the behaviors of neurotypical peers; the creation of social networks and events that allow autistic people to socialize on their own terms; and the recognition of the autistic community as a minority group.

Autism rights or neurodiversity advocates believe that the autism spectrum is genetic and should be accepted as a natural expression of the human genome. This perspective is distinct from two other likewise distinct views: the medical perspective, that autism is caused by a genetic defect and should be addressed by targeting the autism gene(s), and the fringe theory that autism is caused by environmental factors like vaccines and pollution and could be cured by addressing environmental causes.

There are a wide variety of both supportive and critical opinions about the movement among people who are autistic or associated with autistic people. A common criticism leveled against autistic activists is that the majority of them are "high-functioning" or have Asperger syndrome and do not represent the views of "low-functioning" autistic people.

=== Autistic pride ===
Autistic pride refers to pride in autism and shifting views of autism from "disease" to "difference". Autistic pride emphasizes the innate potential in all human phenotypic expressions and celebrates the diversity various neurological types express.

Autistic pride asserts that autistic people are not impaired or damaged; rather, they have a unique set of characteristics that provide them many rewards and challenges, not unlike their non-autistic peers.

Curing autism is a controversial and politicized issue. The "autistic community" can be divided into several groups. Some seek a cure for autism—sometimes dubbed as pro-cure—while others consider a cure unnecessary or unethical, or feel that autism conditions are not harmful or detrimental. For example, it may be seen as an evolutionary adaptation to an ecological niche by some environmentalists and the more radical autism rights campaigners.

=== Autistic culture and community ===
John Elder Robison talks about Be Different on Bookbits radio

With the recent increases in autism recognition and new approaches to educating and socializing autistics, an autistic culture has begun to develop. Autistic culture is based on a belief that autism is a unique way of being and not a disorder to be cured. The Aspie world, as it is sometimes called, contains people with Asperger syndrome (AS) and high functioning autism (HFA), and can be linked to three historical trends: the emergence of AS and HFA as labels, the emergence of the disability rights movement, and the rise of the Internet. Autistic communities exist both online and offline; many people use these for support and communication with others like themselves, as the social limitations of autism sometimes make it difficult to make friends, to establish support within general society, and to construct an identity within society.

Because many autistics find it easier to communicate online than in person, a large number of online resources are available. Some autistic individuals learn sign language, participate in online chat rooms, discussion boards, and websites, or use communication devices at autism-community social events such as Autreat. The Internet helps bypass non-verbal cues and emotional sharing that some autistics tend to have difficulty with. It gives autistic individuals a way to communicate and form online communities.

Conducting work, conversation and interviews online in chat rooms, rather than via phone calls or personal contact, help level the playing field for many autistics. A New York Times article said "the impact of the Internet on autistics may one day be compared in magnitude to the spread of sign language among the deaf" because it opens new opportunities for communication by filtering out "sensory overload that impedes communication among autistics".

=== Globally ===
Autistic people may be perceived differently from country to country. For example, many Africans have spiritual beliefs about psychiatric disorders, which extends into perceived causes of autism. In one survey of Nigerian pediatric or psychiatric nurses, 40% cited preternatural causes of autism such as ancestral spirits or the action of the devil.

== Events and observances ==
Autism-related events and observances are intended to promote public understanding, acceptance and autistic self-advocacy. World Autism Awareness Day, observed on 2 April annually, was designated by the United Nations General Assembly in 2007. Other activities emphasize autistic identity and participation: Autistic Pride Day, held each year on 18 June, celebrates neurodiversity. Autistics Speaking Day, observed on 1 November, encourages autistic people to share their experiences and challenge stereotypes. Community gatherings such as Autreat also offer autistic people the opportunity to meet and discuss shared experiences and identity.

== History ==
Some scholars have argued that tales of changelings in European folklore originated as a folk explanation for autism before it was well understood. These stories generally involve young children being taken by fairies and replaced by changelings – children who "were described as unresponsive, resistant to affection, did not express emotion, cried a lot or did not speak". The connection was proposed in 2005 by Julie Leask, a researcher at the National Centre for Immunisation Research and Surveillance, who investigated the topic after hearing assertions from a modern mother of an autistic child that her true child had been "stolen".

Donald Triplett was the first person diagnosed with autism. He was diagnosed by Kanner after being first examined in 1938, and was labeled as "case 1". Triplett was noted for his savant abilities, particularly being able to name musical notes played on a piano and to mentally multiply numbers. His father, Oliver, described him as socially withdrawn but interested in number patterns, music notes, letters of the alphabet, and U.S. president pictures. By the age of two, he had the ability to recite Psalm 23 and memorized 25 questions and answers from the Presbyterian catechism. He was also interested in creating musical chords.

== Scholarship ==
Autism spectrum disorders received increasing attention from social-science scholars in the early 2000s, with the goals of improving support services and therapies, arguing that autism should be tolerated as a difference not a disorder, and by how autism affects the definition of personhood and identity.

The social motivation theory of autism suggests that because autistic individuals have less interest in social engagement, their ability to form social bonds or react to social rewards is reduced. Social motivation is the want/need for social interactions, to form relationships, respond to social cues, and derive rewards from them. When it comes to autism spectrum disorder (ASD), social motivation is typically reduced, leading to less interest in social engagement compared to neurotypical individuals. This in turn impacts social engagement and interaction patterns. This theory is important because it helps to understand the social challenges faced by autistic individuals when it comes to social motivation, including difficulties in forming relationships, understanding social cues, and grants insights for developing interventions to improve social interaction skills.

Overall, this allows for improvements in social functioning in autism, as deficits can impact everything from peer interactions to educational outcomes. Interventions that increase social motivation can lead to better integration in social and academic settings. However, there are still some gaps in the research. There is limited understanding of how neurobiological, cultural, and individual differences influence social motivation in autism, underlying reduced social motivation in autism and how individual differences influence social engagement.

=== Theories and interventions ===
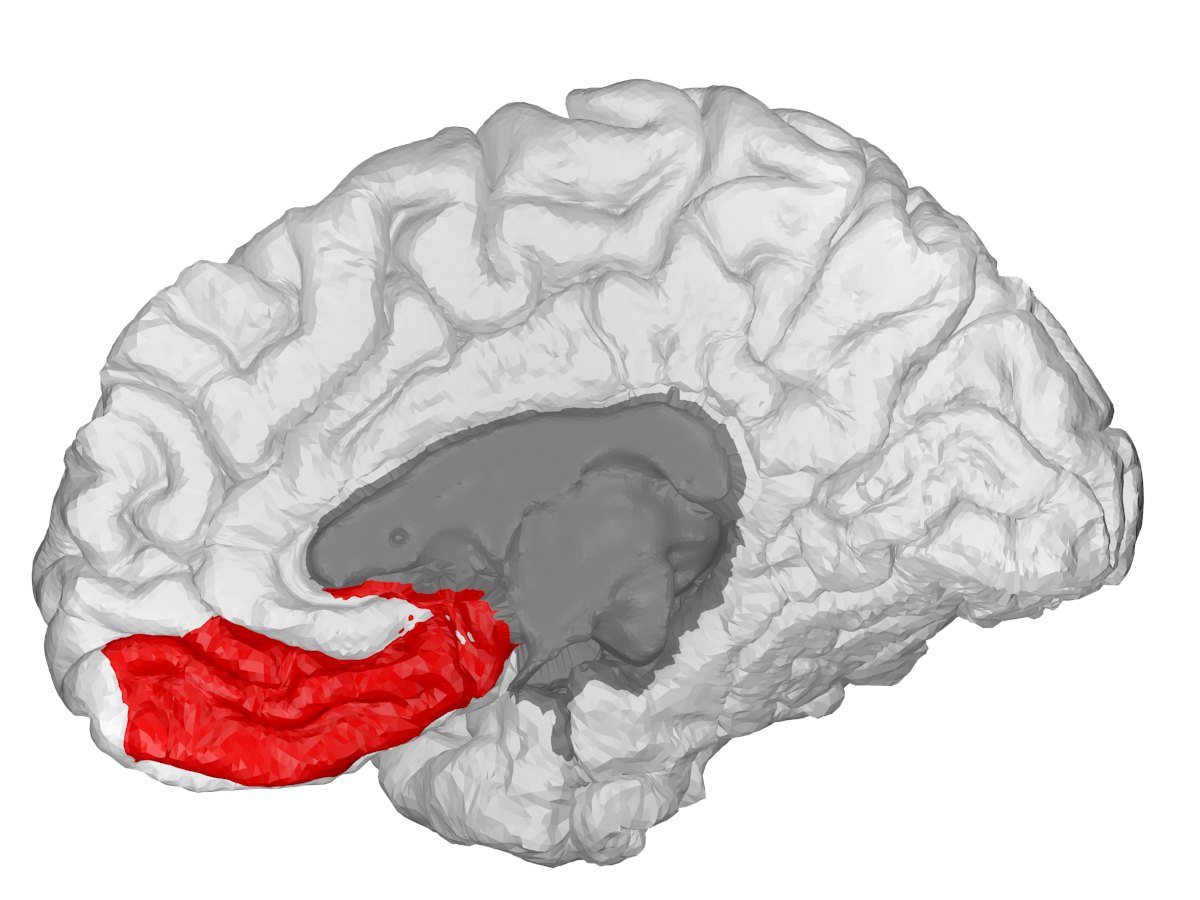
Highlights the orbitofrontal cortex

The core focus of this model is that autism-related social deficits are partly due to reduced social motivation. The theory states that autistic individuals exhibit diminished intrinsic interest in social stimuli, contributing to difficulties in social interactions and relationships. This reduction is linked to atypical reward processing systems in the brain, particularly in regions like the ventral striatum and orbitofrontal cortex, that are key to reward sensitivity for social interactions. Theories like Self-Determination Theory and Social Cognitive Theory help explain how intrinsic and extrinsic factors affect social behaviours in autism in regards to reward processing.

==== Self-determination theory ====
Self-determination theory examines human motivation and personality. It emphasises the importance of intrinsic motivation, which is engaging in activities for their inherent satisfaction, and outlines three psychological needs essential for ideal functioning: autonomy, competence, and relatedness.

Self-Determination Theory explains that intrinsic motivation is often reduced in autistic individuals due to diminished interest in social interaction, creating challenges in building social competence and forming relationships.

==== Social cognitive theory ====
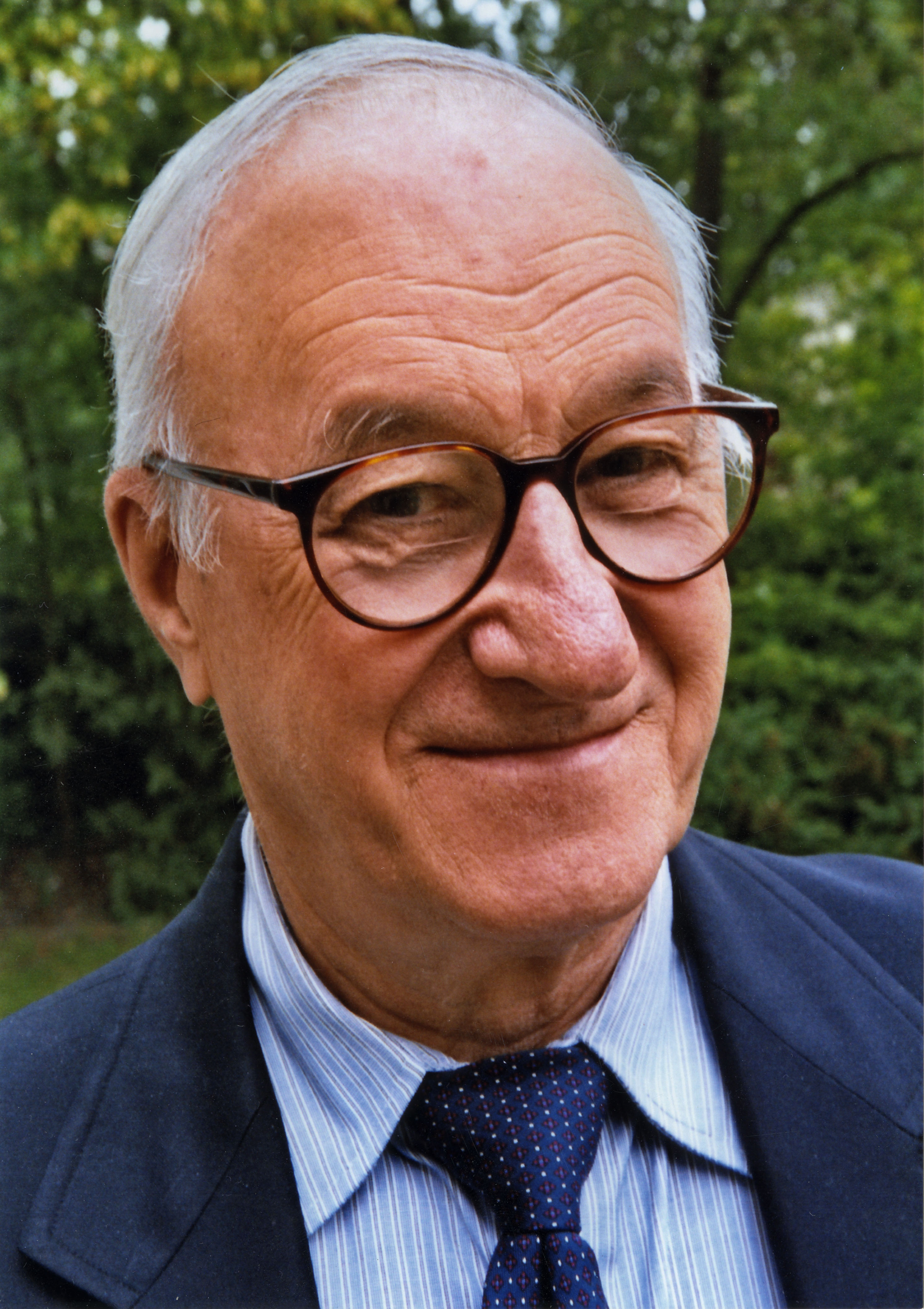
Albert Bandura

Albert Bandura developed social cognitive theory, which focuses on how people learn and develop behaviours through observation, imitation, and interaction with their environment. It emphasises the role of cognitive processes in shaping behaviour, including self-regulation, self-efficacy, and the ability to anticipate consequences.

For autistic individuals, the decreased tendency to seek social engagement because of reduced intrinsic motivation may limit their opportunities to learn, observe, imitate, and practice social behaviours. The theory also underlines the potential role of external reinforcements in encouraging social learning, even when intrinsic interest is initially low, as it is with autistic individuals.

==== Functioning and interventions ====
Showing the ventral striatum

The social motivation theory of autism also suggests that atypical functioning in brain reward systems, such as the ventral striatum and orbitofrontal cortex, may explain reduced interest in social interactions. Studies indicate that autistic individuals show diminished neural responses to social stimuli, including faces and voices, which typically act as strong motivators for social behaviour in neurotypical individuals, like hearing a mother's voice differently. This suggests an impaired link between socially significant auditory stimuli and reward processing, contributing to challenges in social interactions. This type of response reduces the reinforcement value of social engagement, it makes socialising less rewarding and diminishes intrinsic motivation for further interactions.

Recognising these neurobiological differences allows for tailored interventions, such as boosting the impact of social rewards by associating them with activities that the person already finds intrinsically rewarding, structuring environments where social interactions are reinforced through praise, tangible rewards, or positive experiences, and encouraging gradual exposure to social settings to increase comfort and engagement over time. These methods aim to increase both types of motivation for social behaviours, potentially improving social functioning and relationships.

=== Across developmental stages ===
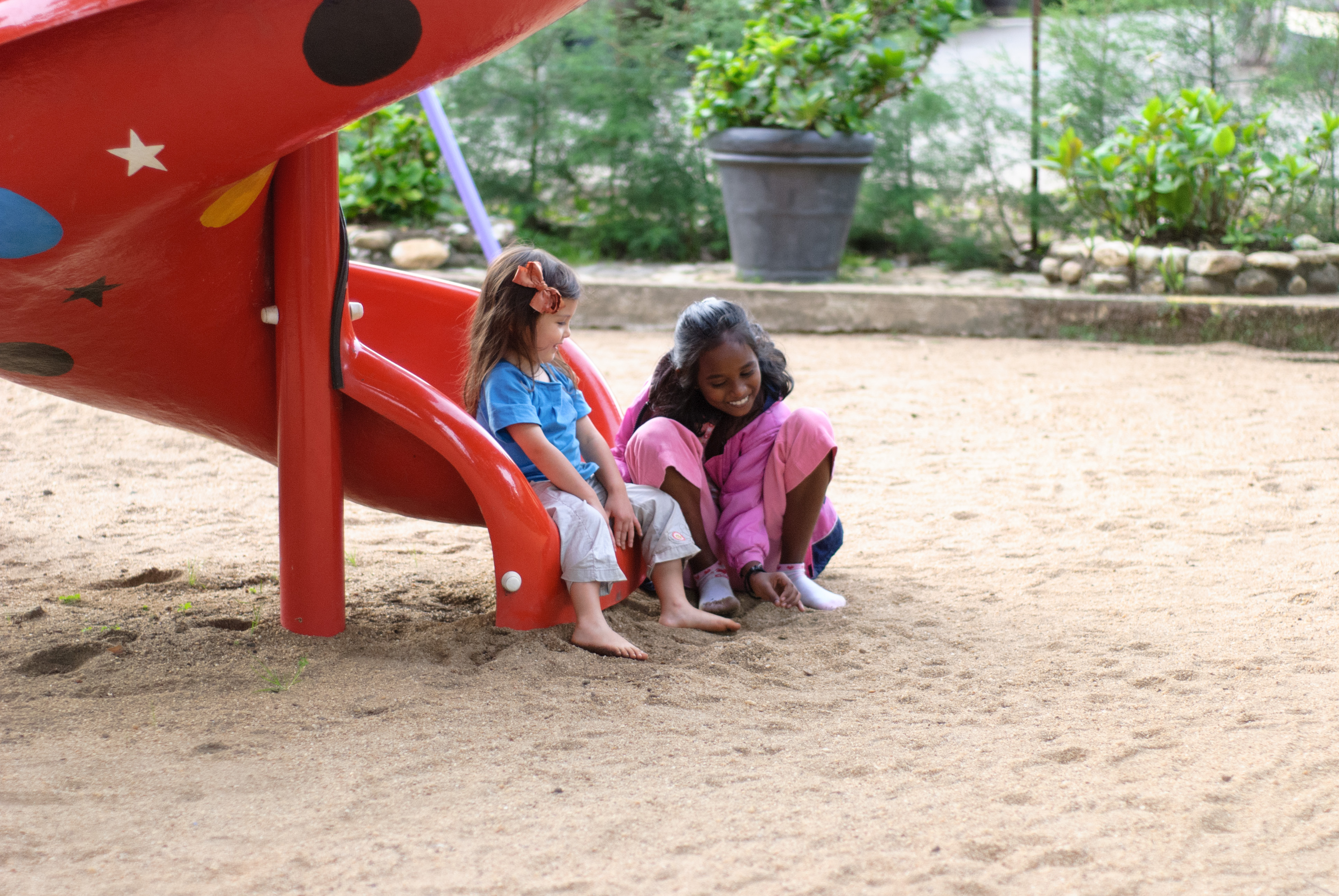
Peer interactions in early childhood

Early childhood attachment helps in shaping social motivation. In typical development, secure attachment to caregivers fosters social engagement and interaction, however, in children with autism, variations in attachment behaviours may affect the development of social motivation. Children with autism may display less overt social-seeking behaviours, such as reduced eye contact, gestures, and joint attention. These differences can lead to challenges forming secure attachment bonds with caregivers. The reduced prominence of social stimuli in autism, such as faces or voices, may diminish the intrinsic rewards associated with caregiver interaction, as shown in studies done with mothers' voices. This can disrupt the feedback loop that typically reinforces social behaviours, influencing social motivation later in life. These early differences in attachment and social motivation can affect peer relationships and broader social competencies, as children with autism may have fewer opportunities to learn and practice social behaviours before further development.

Adolescent social development is strongly influenced by peer interactions, which become more central as teens expand their social networks beyond family. These interactions help adolescents develop skills such as cooperation, communication, and conflict resolution. But, autistic individuals often face difficulties navigating this shift because of reduced social motivation, which affects their ability to connect with peers.

=== Cultural and contextual influences ===
Cultural and contextual influences play a significant role in shaping social motivation among autistic individuals. Social norms, parenting styles, and societal expectations vary across cultures and impact the development and expression of social behaviours.

Cultures emphasising collective harmony and interpersonal relationships may create more structured opportunities for social learning. This could either help mitigate social motivation deficits in autism or heighten challenges due to differing expectations. Programs tailored to cultural values and family dynamics tend to yield better outcomes because they align more with the individual's social environment. Cultural expectations surrounding social interaction can also influence how autistic individuals experience social motivation. For example, in some cultures, there is a higher emphasis on collective behaviours, not just harmony, which may pose challenges for autistic individuals who have reduced social motivation. The research for this theory also often focuses on Western cultures, limiting the applicability of findings across different societies. Expanding research to include diverse cultural contexts would help create a more global understanding of social motivation in autism.

Contextual factors, such as the accessibility of social support systems, inclusion policies, and the availability of autism-specific interventions, also shape social motivation. For example, inclusive education systems and structured social opportunities can enhance motivation and improve social skills by reinforcing positive interactions in supportive environments. On the other hand, settings with limited resources or social stigmas may exacerbate motivational and relational challenges. Studies show that environmental reinforcements, like positive feedback from caregivers or peers, can significantly influence social engagement among autistic individuals.

=== Applications in mental health and education ===
Social motivation theory has significant applications in mental health and education, particularly in addressing the unique challenges faced by autistic individuals.

In mental health, interventions that enhance social motivation—such as cognitive-behavioural strategies or social skills training—help individuals improve social functioning, reduce anxiety related to social interactions, and develop meaningful relationships. For example, strategies like video modelling or reinforcement-based therapies can be adapted to help individuals engage with social stimuli, which is often less intrinsically rewarding for them due to atypical brain reward systems.

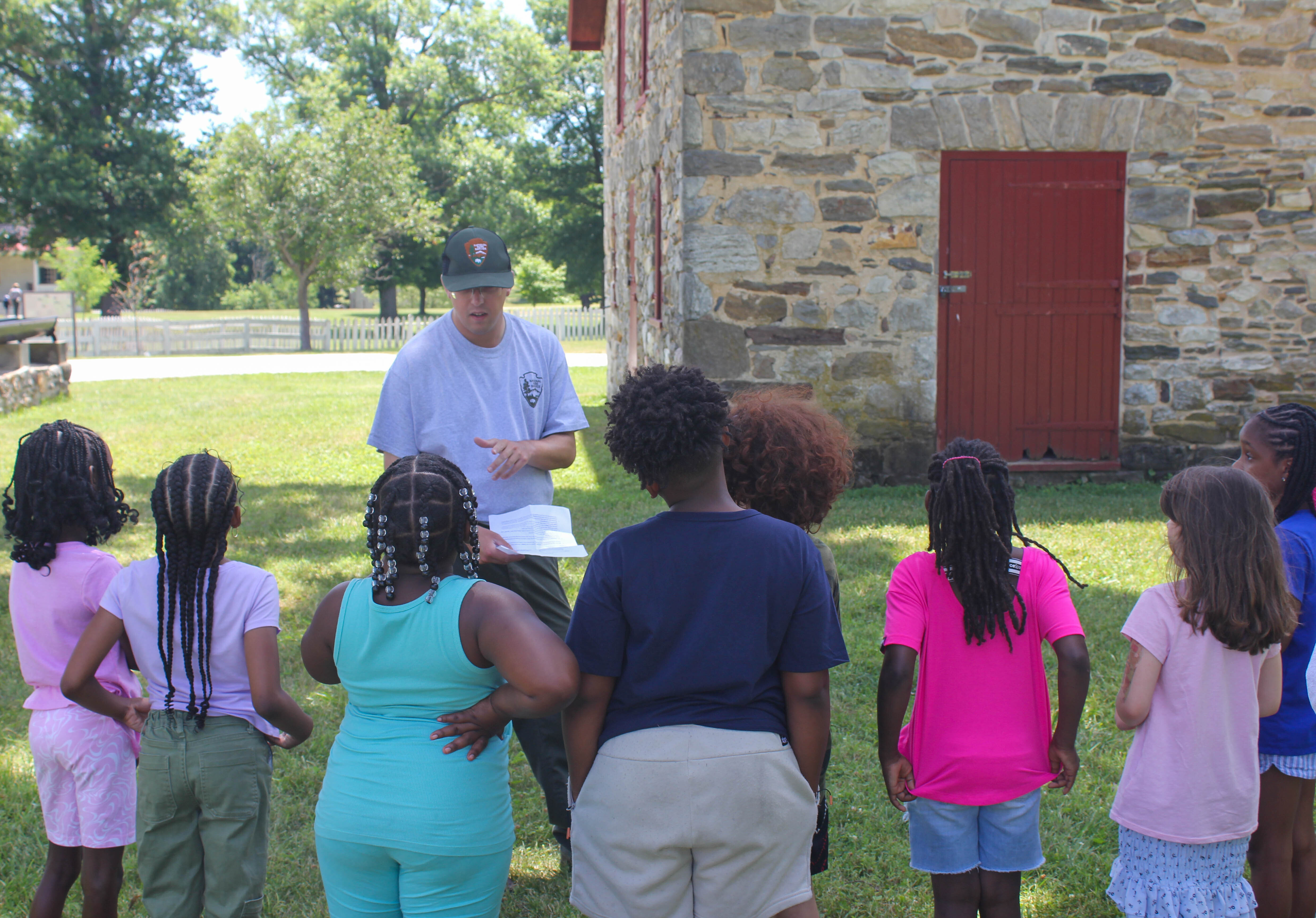
Collaborative group activities

Applying social motivation theory in educational settings supports creating environments that reinforce social engagement to help with motivation. Teachers and educators can use structured programs such as peer-mediated interventions or collaborative group activities to encourage participation and improve communication skills. Tailoring these interventions to individual needs and cultural contexts is vital to their success. Furthermore, incorporating social motivation strategies into Individualised Education Plans (IEPs) helps foster not only academic progress but also essential social skills.

Interventions targeting social motivation, such as social skills training, behavioural interventions, video modelling, and strategies utilising rewards or feedback, have shown promise in improving social engagement. However, these strategies often lack scalability and cultural inclusiveness, which limits their broader application. Tailoring interventions to individuals and cultural contexts is crucial for paving way into meaningful improvements in social motivation and interaction.

=== Critical analysis ===
The strengths of the Social Motivation Theory in autism research include its comprehensive framework linking neurobiological differences to social challenges within the brain, such as diminished interest in social stimuli. This theory has led to effective interventions like social skills training, peer-mediated approaches, and behavioural reinforcement. It also provides developmental insights, helping address social motivation from early childhood to adolescence. The theory's applications in mental health and education emphasise improving social engagement, self-regulation, and integration. By considering cultural and contextual factors, it encourages inclusive, globally relevant interventions.

Overall, the findings related to the Social Motivation Theory of autism are generally consistent, which strengthens it, but there are some slight variations across studies, particularly in how these deficits manifest and the effectiveness of interventions. Importantly, research consistently supports the core idea that autistic individuals show reduced social motivation, such as diminished responses to social cues like faces and voices, often linked to atypical reward processing in the brain. Studies also consistently highlight challenges in forming relationships, understanding social norms, and engaging with peers, a core feature of the theory.

The theory has some limitations and gaps. First, some of the findings across studies are inconsistent, with variability in how social motivation deficits manifest due to differences in autism severity, co-occurring conditions, and age groups. Second, while neurobiological research links social motivation deficits to areas like the ventral striatum, the exact mechanisms within the brain remain unclear. Third, much of the research is based on Western populations, with limits understanding of how cultural and contextual factors influence social motivation. Additionally, interventions targeting social motivation, such as social skills training, are often not scalable or culturally inclusive. Finally, more research is needed to explore how individual differences (e.g., sensory sensitivities or anxiety) affect social motivation.

=== Synthesis and interpretation ===
The Social Motivation Theory of autism proposes that autistic individuals experience reduced social motivation, which lead to difficulties in forming relationships and responding to social cues. This reduction is linked to atypical brain reward processing and frameworks such as Self-Determination Theory and Social Cognitive Theory help explain how intrinsic motivation and social learning are hindered by diminished social engagement.

Interventions mainly focus on enhancing these motivations by structuring environments and using rewards to reinforce social behaviours to simulate the lacking intrinsic motivation. Techniques like peer-mediated and social skills training are particularly effective during early childhood and adolescence, the critical periods for social skill development.

Cultural and contextual factors further affect social motivation, with collective-oriented cultures potentially presenting additional challenges for autistic individuals. However, most studies focus on Western populations, indicating the need for broader, cross-cultural research.

While the theory has helped create some effective interventions, research inconsistencies and gaps remain, particularly regarding the specific neurobiological mechanisms behind social motivation deficits. There is also a lack of culturally inclusive interventions due to above stated focus on Western populations. More research is needed to address these limitations and expand the theory's applicability across different contexts.

== Media portrayals ==
Much of the public perception of autism is based on its portrayals in biographies, movies, novels, and TV series. Many of these portrayals have been inaccurate, and have contributed to a divergence between public perception and the clinical reality of autism. For example, in the movie Mozart and the Whale (2005), the opening scene gives four clues that a leading character has Asperger syndrome, and two of these clues are extraordinary savant skills. The savant skills are not needed in the film, but in the movies savant skills have become a stereotype for the autism spectrum, because of the incorrect assertion that most autistic people are savants.

Some works from the 1970s have autistic characters, who are rarely labeled. In contrast, in the BBC Two television miniseries The Politician's Husband (2013), the impact of Noah Hoynes' Asperger's on the boy's behavior and on his family, and steps Noah's loved ones take to accommodate and address it, are prominent plot points in all three episodes.

Popular media have depicted special talents of some autistic people, including exceptional abilities as seen in the 1988 movie Rain Man. Such portrayals have been criticized by both scientific studies and media analysts over the years for fostering a pigeonholing image of autism that leads to false expectations about real-life autistic individuals, with Rain Man being singled out for popularizing it.

Since the 1970s, fictional portrayals of people with autism spectrum conditions such as Asperger syndrome have become more frequent. Public perception of autism is often based on these fictional portrayals in novels, biographies, movies, and TV series. These depictions of autism in media today are often made in a way that brings pity to the public and their concern of the topic, because their viewpoint is never actually shown, leaving the public without knowledge of autism and its diagnosis. Portrayals in the media of characters with atypical abilities (for example, the ability to multiply large numbers without a calculator) may be misinterpreted by viewers as accurate portrayals of all autistic people and of autism itself. Additionally, the media frequently depicts autism as only affecting children, which promotes the misconception that autism does not affect adults.

== Notable individuals ==
Some notable autistic people are:

- Businessman Elon Musk
- American food animal handling systems designer and author Temple Grandin
- American Pulitzer Prize-winning music critic and author Tim Page
- Australian musician, lead singer and only constant member of rock band the Vines Craig Nicholls
- English actor and filmmaker Paddy Considine
- Swedish environmental activist Greta Thunberg
- Irish YouTuber Seán McLaughlin
- Television personality and librarian Mychal Threets

Thunberg, who in August 2018 started the "School Strike for Climate" movement, has explained how the "gift" of living with Asperger syndrome helps her "see things from outside the box" when it comes to climate change. In an interview with presenter Nick Robinson on BBC Radio 4's Today, the then-16-year-old activist said that autism helps her see things in "black and white". She went on to say:

It makes me different, and being different is a gift, I would say. It also makes me see things from outside the box. I don't easily fall for lies, I can see through things. I don't think I would be interested in the climate at all, if I had been like everyone else. Many people say that it doesn't matter, you can cheat sometimes. But I can't do that. You can't be a little bit sustainable. Either you're sustainable, or not sustainable. For way too long the politicians and people in power have got away with not doing anything at all to fight the climate crisis and ecological crisis, but we will make sure that they will not get away with it any longer.

Scottish singer Susan Boyle was diagnosed with Asperger's at the age of 51. Boyle was originally believed to have had slight brain damage at birth. Boyle rose to fame after appearing on the talent show Britain's Got Talent in 2009. Her debut album I Dreamed a Dream, released in 2009, became the fastest selling debut by a UK artist of all time. American actress Daryl Hannah, star of movies such as Splash, Steel Magnolias and Wall Street, was diagnosed as being on the autism spectrum as a child. Diagnosed at fifteen, Heather Kuzmich appeared on America's Next Top Model in 2007. Although she did not win the competition, Kuzmich was voted the viewers' favourite eight weeks in a row. She has since been signed to Elite Model Management. New Zealand-born musician Ladyhawke and gold medal-winning British Paralympic swimmer Jessica-Jane Applegate are also autistic. In June 2021, Scottish strongman Tom Stoltman, became the first person with autism to win the World's Strongest Man competition. Welsh actor Anthony Hopkins is the first openly autistic actor to win an Academy Award.

Additionally, media speculation of contemporary figures as being on the autism spectrum has become popular in recent times. New York magazine reported some examples, which included that Time magazine suggested that Bill Gates is autistic, and that a biographer of Warren Buffett wrote that his prodigious memory and "fascination with numbers" give him "a vaguely autistic aura". The magazine also reported that on Celebrity Rehab, Dr. Drew Pinsky deemed basketball player Dennis Rodman a candidate for an Asperger's diagnosis, and the UCLA specialist consulted "seemed to concur". Nora Ephron criticized these conclusions, writing that popular speculative diagnoses suggest autism is "an epidemic, or else a wildly over-diagnosed thing that there used to be other words for". The practice of diagnosing autism in these cases is controversial.

Some historical personalities are also the subject of speculation about being autistic, e.g. Michelangelo.

== Symbols and flags ==
=== Puzzle piece ===
The Society for Autistic Children's original logo combined a puzzle piece with an image of a crying child.

In 1963, the UK's Society for Autistic Children, later known as the National Autistic Society, adopted a puzzle piece as its logo. Designed by board member Gerald Gasson, it showed a crying child within a puzzle piece. The design reflected the organisation's view of autism as a "puzzling" condition.

Other autism organisations later adopted the motif. Autism Speaks used a blue puzzle piece in its logo. For its 15th anniversary in 2020, it introduced a broader range of colours, which the organisation said represented diverse perspectives and experiences of autism and its commitment to inclusion.

The puzzle piece has been criticised by autistic advocates for suggesting that autistic people are incomplete or are a problem to be solved.

=== Infinity symbols ===
The rainbow infinity symbol is used to represent neurodiversity, including autism.

The rainbow infinity symbol is used to represent neurodiversity, including diversity among autistic people and in human cognitive abilities. An early use was for Autistic Pride Day, established by Aspies for Freedom in 2005.

A gold infinity symbol is used specifically to represent autism.

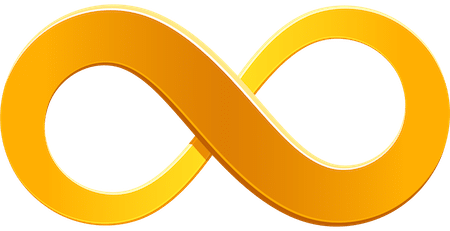
A gold infinity symbol used to represent autism.

=== Colours ===
Blue has been used in autism awareness campaigns, including Autism Speaks' "Light It Up Blue" initiative. In 2017, science writer Emily Willingham urged readers not to light buildings blue or wear blue for autism awareness, arguing that these activities supported Autism Speaks.

In an article promoting Autistic UK's "Going Gold" campaign, Julian Morgan advocated using gold and a gold infinity symbol to represent autism acceptance. The choice draws on Au, the chemical symbol for gold and the first two letters of "autism".

=== Flags ===
A flag featuring a rainbow infinity symbol on a white background has been used to represent autistic people and the wider neurodiversity community. Autistics United Canada used this design for a flag-raising event in 2019.

Joseph Redford designed an autistic pride flag in 2015. The People's History Museum displayed it in its exhibition Nothing About Us Without Us. The museum describes a green and purple flag with a gold sunburst surrounding a rainbow infinity symbol. According to Redford's explanation reproduced in the exhibition guide, green represents being true to one's nature and purple represents neurodiversity.

In January 2021, Autistic Empire announced the release of an autistic pride flag with a gold background and a rainbow infinity symbol outlined in white. The organisation explained that the infinity symbol represented neurodiversity, the rainbow represented the pride movement, and gold referred to its chemical symbol, Au.

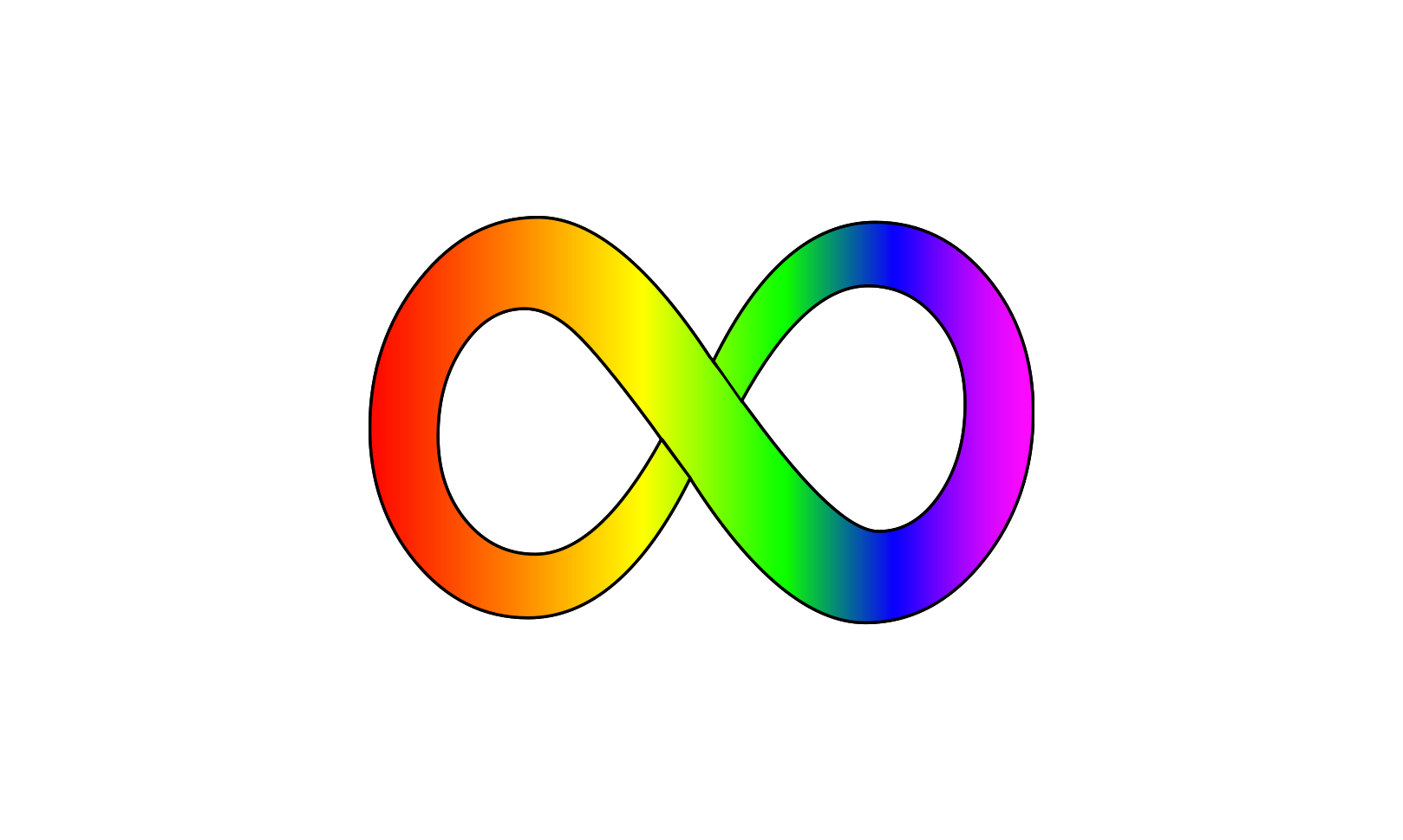
A rainbow infinity flag used to represent autism and neurodiversity.

Joseph Redford's autistic pride flag, designed in 2015.

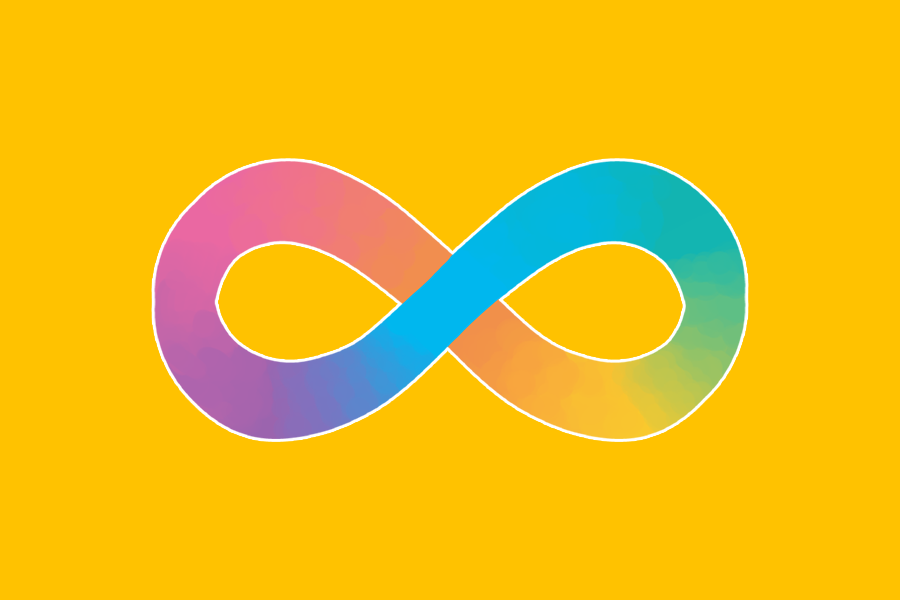
The autistic pride flag released by Autistic Empire in 2021.

=== Ribbons ===
The multicoloured puzzle-piece ribbon was introduced as a symbol of autism awareness in 1999.

In 1999, the Autism Society of America introduced a multicoloured puzzle-piece awareness ribbon as a symbol of autism awareness.

== See also ==
- Autism-friendly
- Autism: The Musical
- Autistic art
- Look Me in the Eye, John Elder Robison's memoir about growing up with Asperger syndrome
- Love on the Spectrum (Australian TV series)
- Social model of disability
- Discrimination against autistic people
- Empathy in autistic people
