= Autism awareness and recognition events =

Public observances and campaigns concerning autism

Autism awareness and recognition events include public observances, campaigns and community gatherings concerned with autism. These initiatives seek to increase public understanding, promote acceptance and inclusion, or provide opportunities for autistic people to share their experiences. They include World Autism Awareness Day, Autism Sunday, Autistic Pride Day and Autistics Speaking Day.

The aims and approaches of these initiatives vary. Awareness campaigns draw public attention to autism, while acceptance and pride initiatives emphasise autistic identity, neurodiversity and self-advocacy. Some autistic advocates have criticised campaigns for portraying autism negatively or failing to represent autistic people's perspectives.

== International ==
=== Autism Sunday ===
Autism Sunday, also known as the International Day of Prayer for Autism and Asperger Syndrome, is a Christian observance held annually on the second Sunday of February. It originated in the United Kingdom in 2002, when autism campaigners Ivan Corea and Charika Corea launched it with a service at St Paul's Cathedral in London. The initiative sought to increase understanding of autism and subsequently attracted participation in other countries. Its founders have encouraged churches to understand autistic people's needs and include them in their communities.

=== Light It Up Blue ===
In 2010, Autism Speaks launched Light It Up Blue, a campaign in which buildings are illuminated in blue to mark World Autism Awareness Day and Autism Awareness Month. Participating landmarks have included the Empire State Building in New York City and the CN Tower in Toronto.

Autistic advocates have criticised Autism Speaks for its representation of autistic people and its historical emphasis on finding a cure. Some have also opposed the use of blue in autism awareness campaigns because of its association with the organisation.

=== World Autism Awareness Day ===
World Autism Awareness Day is an international observance held annually on 2 April. The United Nations General Assembly established it in December 2007 following a proposal from Qatar, and it was first observed in 2008. The observance seeks to increase public understanding of autism and promote autistic people's human rights, inclusion and participation in society.

Activities include United Nations discussions, public education campaigns and community events. The United Nations selects an annual theme addressing subjects such as education, employment, autonomy and support for autistic people.

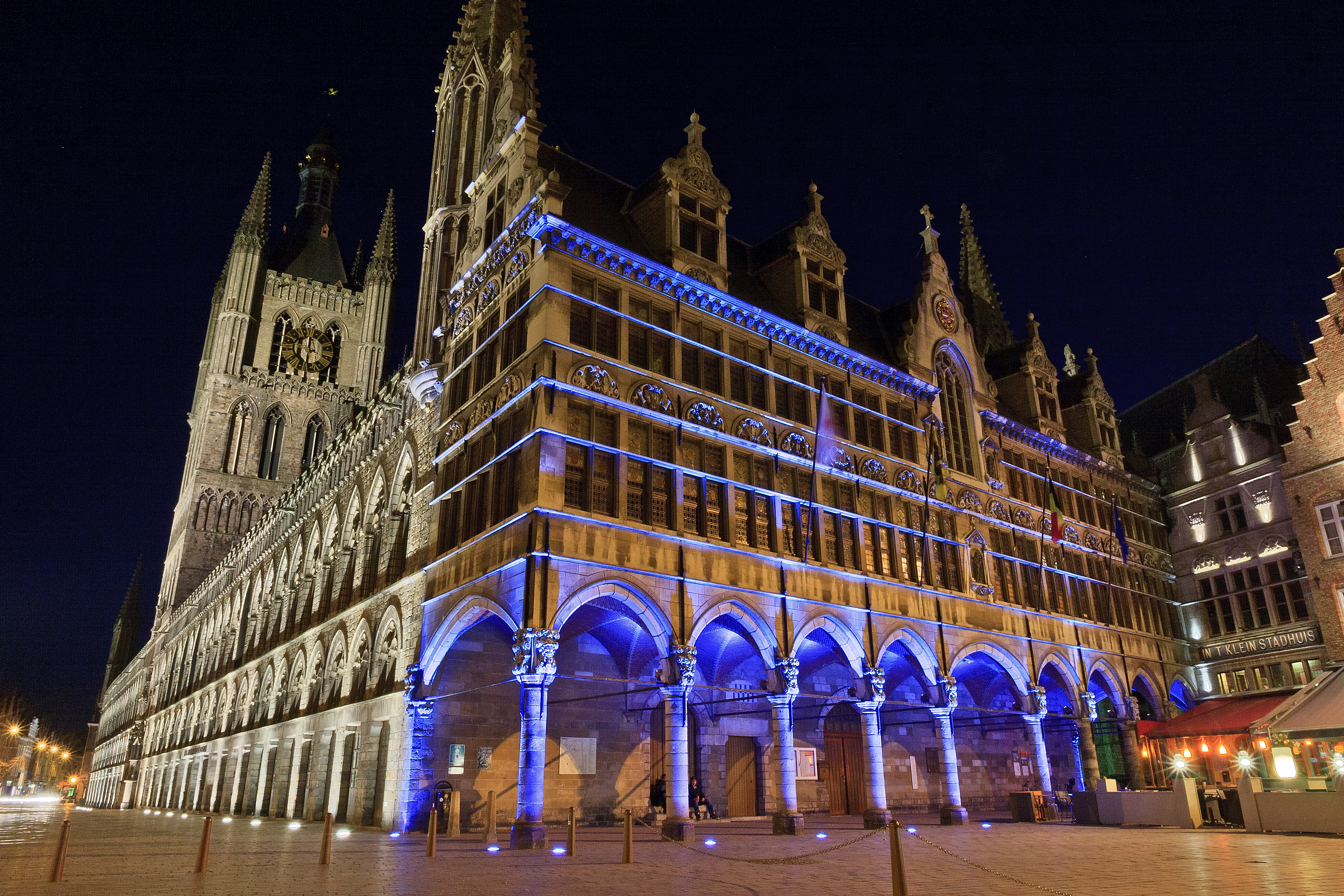
The Cloth Hall and adjoining Nieuwerck in Ypres, Belgium, illuminated for World Autism Awareness Day on 2 April 2013

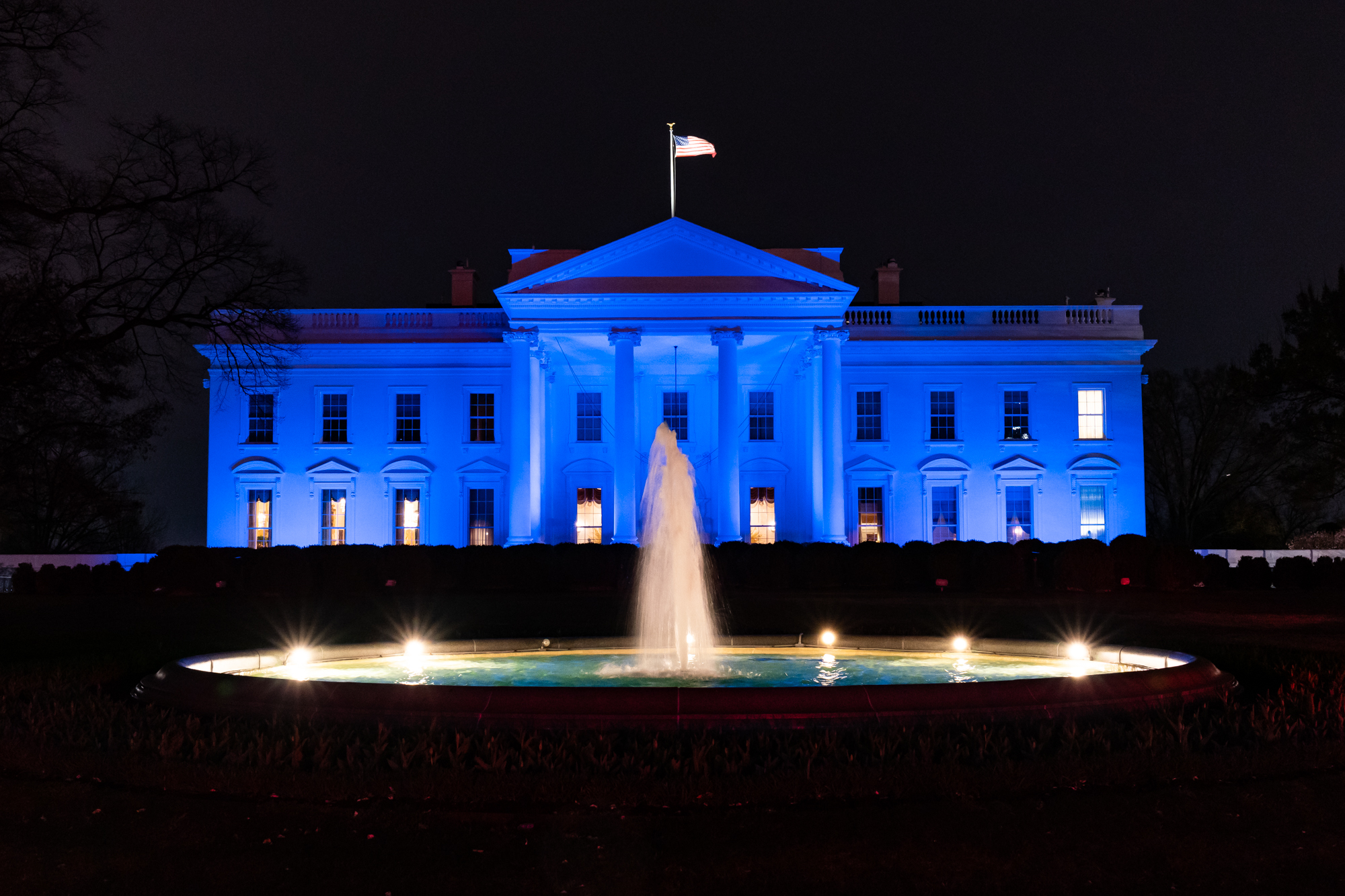
The White House in Washington, D.C., United States, illuminated for World Autism Awareness Day on 2 April 2019

Tokyo Tower in Tokyo, Japan, illuminated for World Autism Awareness Day on 2 April 2024

== United Kingdom ==
=== Autism Awareness Year ===
The year 2002 was marked as Autism Awareness Year in the United Kingdom, following an initiative by Ivan and Charika Corea, whose son is autistic. Participating organisations included the British Institute of Brain Injured Children, the Disabilities Trust, The Shirley Foundation, the National Autistic Society and Autism London. Prime Minister Tony Blair expressed support for the campaign. Activities included a conference at the King's Fund in London and the promotion of autism awareness ribbons.

=== Autistic Pride Day ===
Autistic Pride Day is observed annually on 18 June. It was established in 2005 through the online forum of Aspies For Freedom, a group based in the United Kingdom.

The initiative drew inspiration from other pride movements and sought to empower autistic people and promote acceptance of autistic identity. Observances have included picnics, public speaking and online participation. Events are organised independently rather than directed by a central authority.

== United States of America ==
=== Autistics Speaking Day ===
Autistics Speaking Day is an annual online self-advocacy event held on 1 November. It began in 2010 through collaboration between autistic blogger Corina Becker in Canada and Kathryn Bjornstad in the United States.

The event developed in response to Communication Shutdown, a fundraising campaign initiated by Australia's AEIOU Foundation. That campaign asked participants to avoid Facebook and Twitter for a day as an exercise intended to increase understanding of autistic people's communication difficulties. Becker and Bjornstad argued that this approach overlooked the role of the internet in helping autistic people communicate and reduce social isolation.

Autistics Speaking Day instead encouraged autistic people to share their experiences, difficulties, strengths and interests through blogs and social media, with the aim of challenging negative stereotypes. Becker proposed the alternative on her blog, and Bjornstad promoted it through a Facebook event. The first observance attracted international participation, and a permanent Facebook page was established following requests for an annual event.

=== Autism Acceptance Day and Month ===
Autism Acceptance Day was first held in the United States on 1 April 2011, following an initiative by autistic disability rights activist Paula C. Durbin-Westby. She established it in response to negative portrayals of autism in awareness campaigns held during April.

The initiative developed into Autism Acceptance Month, observed throughout April. According to Durbin-Westby, its purpose was to promote acceptance and belonging, recognise neurodiversity, and support services tailored to autistic people's individual needs rather than efforts to cure autism. The initiative emerged from autistic people and their allies, and the Autistic Self Advocacy Network subsequently established an Autism Acceptance Month website.

=== Autism Acceptance Project ===
The Autism Acceptance Project was founded in 2006 by Estée Klar, the mother of an autistic child, with the involvement of autistic advisers and board members. It promotes acceptance, accommodations and autistic participation in decisions affecting autistic people. Its activities have included lectures, exhibitions and online resources.

=== Autreat ===
Autreat was a retreat-style conference organised in the United States by Autism Network International, with programmes dating from 1996. Designed and run by autistic people, it provided opportunities to socialise, explore autistic identity and develop self-advocacy skills in an environment accommodating sensory and communication differences. Family members, friends and professionals were also welcome. Activities included optional workshops, while colour-coded badges allowed participants to indicate their preferences for social interaction. Its focus was living as autistic people rather than causes, cures or making participants appear non-autistic.

=== Disability Day of Mourning ===
Disability Day of Mourning originated in the United States in 2012 and is observed annually on 1 March. It commemorates people with disabilities murdered by family members or caregivers. The Autistic Self Advocacy Network and other disability rights organisations coordinate local vigils to remember victims and call for justice and equal protection under the law.

Autistic activist Zoe Gross initiated the observance after the murder of George Hodgins, an autistic man, by his mother in Sunnyvale, California, in March 2012. Gross objected to coverage that expressed sympathy for his mother while portraying Hodgins as a burden. Working with the Autistic Self Advocacy Network, Not Dead Yet and the National Council on Independent Living, she organised vigils to commemorate disabled victims and affirm the value of their lives.

Although founded by an autistic activist, the observance commemorates victims across the disability community. Participation has extended beyond the United States, including international online vigils.
