= Jim Sinclair (activist) =

American activist and writer

- Born: James Sinclair; United States
- Other name: Toby
- Education: Syracuse University
- Occupations: Activist, writer
- Known for: Autism Network International

James Sinclair is an American autistic activist and writer who helped pioneer the neurodiversity movement. Sinclair, along with Xenia Grant and Donna Williams, formed Autism Network International (ANI). Sinclair became the original coordinator of ANI. Sinclair is an advocate for the anti-cure position on autism, arguing that autism is an integral part of a person's identity and should not be cured. Sinclair is intersex.

== Biography ==
Sinclair is Jewish and grew up with a mother, a father, and a brother. At a very young age, Sinclair identified with other disabled people. Sinclair saw a blind man walking with a cane and imitated him using a cane found in grandparents' basement. When Sinclair was six years old playing with a set of Johnny West action figures with the brother, if one of the arms came loose, Sinclair would secure it by turning the lasso into an improvised sling. For another figure that broke, Sinclair fashioned a wheelchair. Jim explained that "from very early on, I had the concept that you don't throw people away for being broken".

Sinclair did not speak until age 12. Sinclair was raised as a girl and describes having an intersex body, and in a 1997 introduction to the Intersex Society of North America, Sinclair wrote, "I remain openly and proudly neuter, both physically and socially." Sinclair appeared on The Sally Jessy Raphael Show as a guest with the alias "Toby" to talk about being intersex, aromantic and asexual.

In 1998, Sinclair was a graduate student of rehabilitation counseling at Syracuse University in Syracuse, New York.

Sinclair was the first person to "articulate the autism rights position".

== Views ==
In 1993, Sinclair wrote the essay "Don't Mourn for Us" (1993) with an anti-cure perspective on autism. The essay has been mentioned in The New York Times and New York magazine. In the essay, Sinclair writes,

You didn't lose a child to autism. You lost a child because the child you waited for never came into existence. That isn't the fault of the autistic child who does exist, and it shouldn't be our burden. We need and deserve families who can see us and value us for ourselves, not families whose vision of us is obscured by the ghosts of children who never lived. Grieve if you must, for your own lost dreams. But don't mourn for us. We are alive. We are real.
—Jim Sinclair, "Don't Mourn for Us", Our Voice, Vol. 1, No. 3, 1993

Sinclair also expresses their frustration with the double standard autistic people face, such as being told their persistence is "pathological" when neurotypical people are praised for their dedication to something important to them. Sinclair has criticized the medical view that autistic people have deficits in social skills, arguing that autistic people can be compared to a different culture in a neurotypical-dominated society.

== Autreat ==
Sinclair established and ran Autism Network International, also known as Autreat, the first independent autistic-run gathering, for fifteen years.

== See also ==
- Autism Network International
