= Autism Awareness Campaign UK =

Health campaign

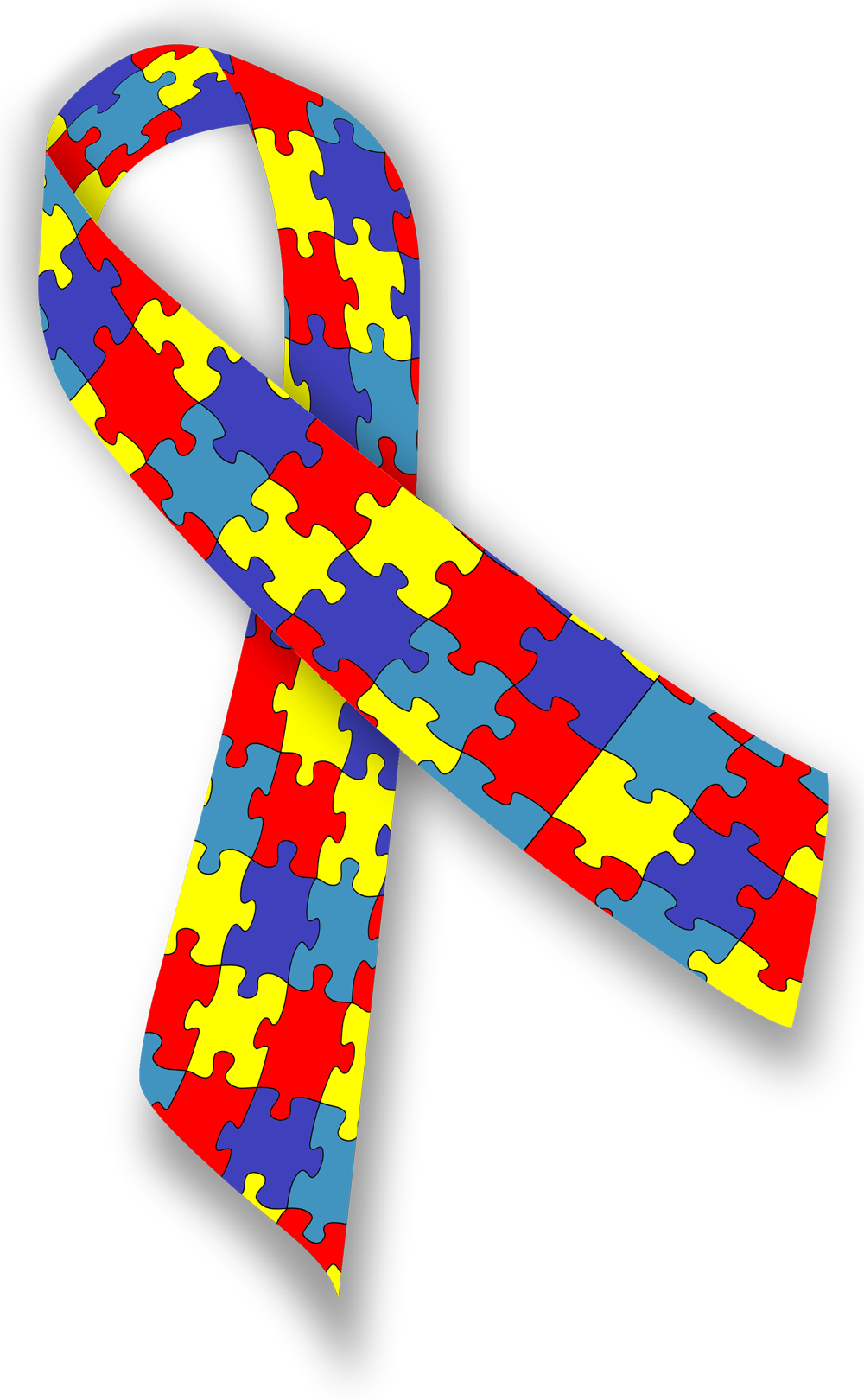
Autism Awareness Ribbon

The Autism Awareness Campaign – United Kingdom was launched in 2000 by British parents and carers Ivan Corea and his wife Charika Corea in response to the autism diagnosis of their son, Charin.

== Objectives ==
According to their website, Autism Awareness Campaign – United Kingdom was started in 2000 "to campaign on behalf of parents, carers, children and adults with autism and Asperger syndrome, for better public services in health, education, specialist speech therapy and respite care; for independent research into the causes of autism; for greater public awareness on Autism and Asperger's Syndrome", as well as other areas where they believe there is a shortfall in public-service provision. They have lobbied for greater "awareness" of the condition and for independent research on the causes of autism.

== Events ==
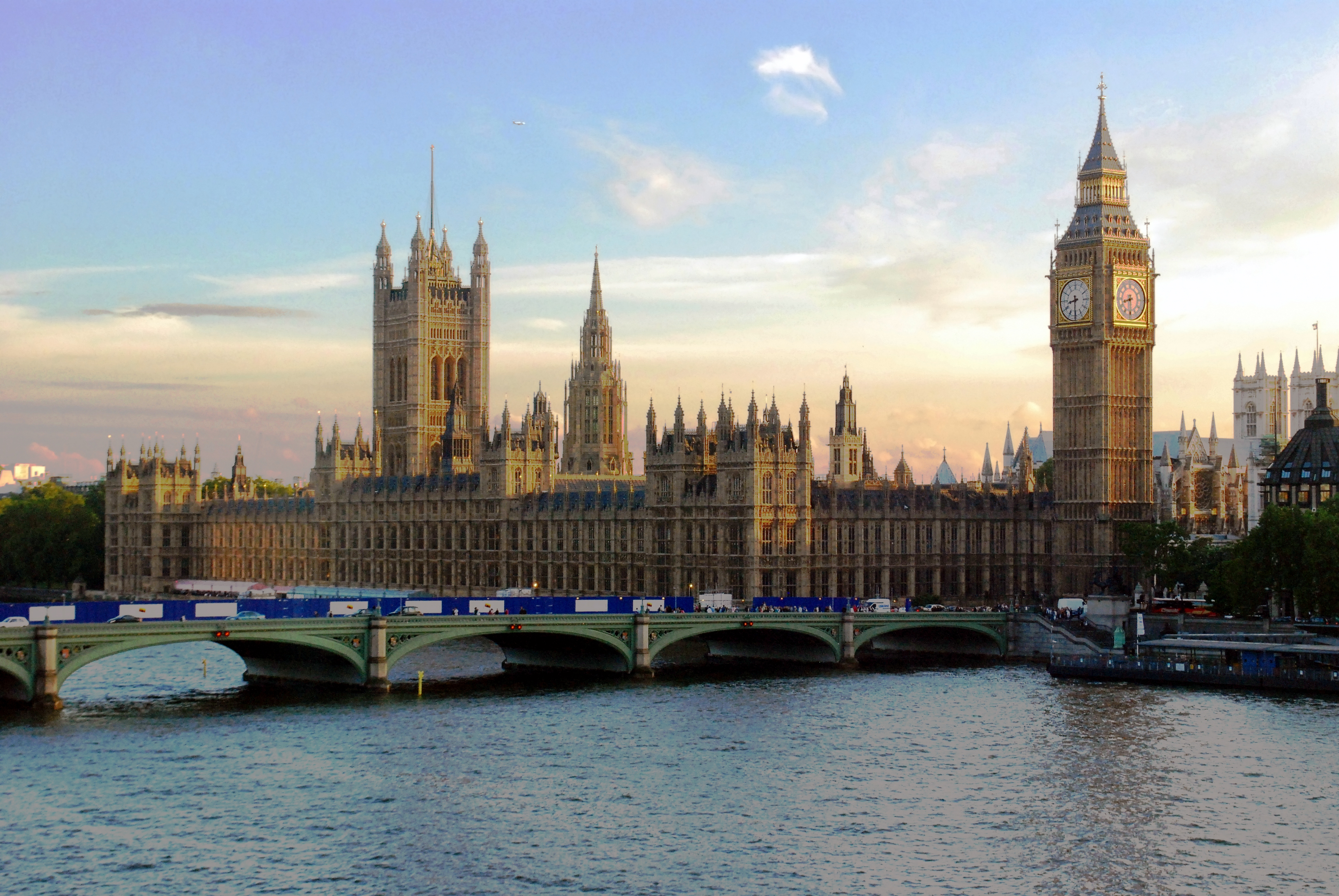
British prime minister Tony Blair met with autism campaigner Ivan Corea and Lee Scott MP in the Palace of Westminster in 2007 to discuss autism

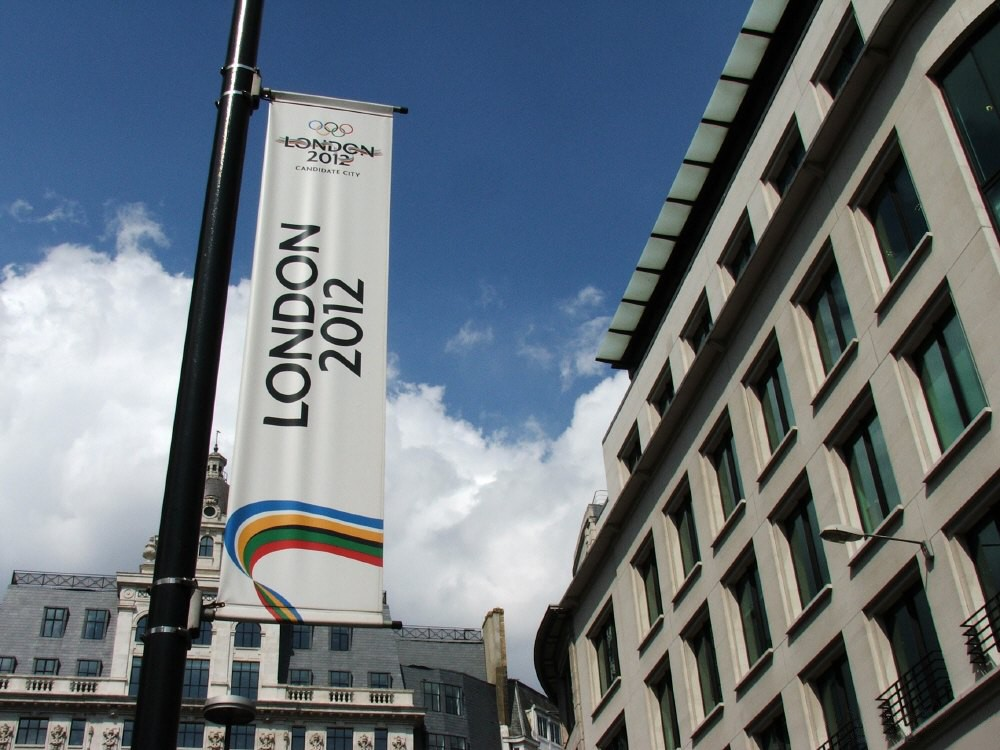
London 2012 Olympic bid

=== 2002 United Kingdom Autism Awareness Year ===
The Autism Awareness Campaign of 2002 initiated debates in the Parliament of the United Kingdom and the Scottish Parliament for Autism Awareness Year, supported by 800 UK organisations including the British Institute of Brain Injured Children, The Disabilities Trust, Autism London and the National Autistic Society. A major conference on autism was held at the King's Fund in London and the first ever service for autism was launched in 2002 by the couple who initiated Autism Sunday – it was held at St Paul's Cathedral. Autism Sunday is now a massive worldwide event, celebrated in many countries.

=== 2007 House of Commons autism debate and meeting with Prime Minister ===
The Autism Awareness Campaign helped raise "awareness" about the condition in 2007 in the House of Commons when Lee Scott, MP for Ilford North, brought a debate on autistic children.

Ivan Corea met with the Prime Minister of the United Kingdom, Tony Blair and Lee Scott MP in April 2007. He presented the Prime Minister with a report calling for a national strategy on autism and a 10-year plan of action in the UK. The call for an urgent review on autism services was supported by leading British charities and community organisations including faith communities. Parliamentarians signed an early day motion on autism (EDM 1359) backing the call for a national strategy on autism and change in policy for people with autism and Asperger syndrome. Ivan Corea met with the British prime minister-in-Waiting, Gordon Brown in June 2007 to urge him to launch the national strategy and 10-year plan on autism, particularly in building state-of-the-art "autism schools".

=== World Autism Awareness Day ===
The Autism Awareness Campaign UK were involved in the first United Nations World Autism Awareness Day, declared by the United Nations General Assembly on Wednesday 2 April 2008 on the recommendation of the State of Qatar.

The campaign called on the United Nations Secretary-General, Ban Ki-moon to launch a world autism strategy. A CNN interview with presenter Max Foster was televised to mark World Autism Awareness Day on 2 April 2008. International coverage about the Autism Awareness Campaign UK was also given on Associated Press and the campaigners received national coverage in the United Kingdom.

The campaigners released a film to mark the United Nations World Autism Awareness Day with British peer the Baroness Uddin in the House of Lords. Open Every Door, written by the award-winning Sri Lanka-born singer and songwriter, Nimal Mendis, was aired on the UN World Autism Awareness Day by CNN.

=== London 2012 Olympic and Paralympic bid ===
Lord Coe appointed Ivan Corea as a London 2012 Olympic bid Ambassador; the Autism Awareness Campaign UK were fully involved with the London 2012 Olympic and Paralympic bid.

== See also ==
- Autistic rights movement
- Autism
- Awareness ribbon
- Consciousness raising
- Health inequality in the United Kingdom
- Outline of autism
- World Autism Awareness Day
