= World Autism Awareness Day =

Internationally recognized day on 2 April

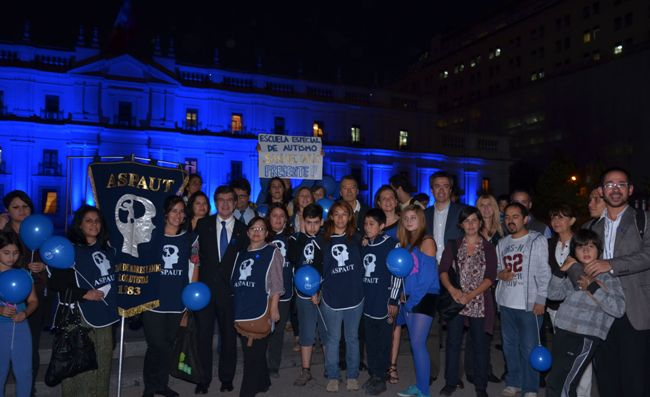
- A World Autism Awareness Day event in Santiago, Chile in 2013
- Official name: World Autism Awareness Day
- Observed by: United Nations Member States
- Date: 2 April
- Next time: 2 April 2027
- Frequency: Annual
- First time: 2008
- Started by: United Nations

World Autism Awareness Day or World Autism Acceptance Day is an internationally recognized day (observed annually on 2 April) that encourages member states of the United Nations to take measures to raise global awareness of autism, promote the acceptance, appreciation and inclusion of autistic individuals and recognize such individuals' local and global contributions. The date was chosen to mark the beginning of World Autism Awareness Month, an observance which serves a similar purpose.

Alternatively, Autistic Pride Day, a pride celebration organized by and for autistic people, is held annually on 18 June.

== History ==
It was designated by the United Nations General Assembly resolution (A/RES/62/139), passed in council on 1 November 2007, and adopted on 18 December 2007. It was proposed by Moza bint Nasser Al-Missned, the United Nations Representative from Qatar, and supported by all member states. This resolution was passed and adopted without a vote in the UN General Assembly, mainly as a supplement to previous UN initiatives to improve human rights.

In 2014, World Autism Awareness Day coincided with Onesie Wednesday, a day created by the National Autistic Society to encourage people in England, Wales and Northern Ireland to show their support for autistic people. By wearing a onesie or pajamas, participants are saying, "It's all right to be different".

== Components ==
The original resolution had four main components:

- The establishment of the second day of April as World Autism Awareness Day, beginning in 2008.
- Invitation to Member States and other relevant organizations to the UN or the international societal system, including non-governmental organizations and the private sector, to create initiatives to raise public awareness of autism.
- Encourages Member States to raise awareness of autism on all levels in society.
- Asks the UN Secretary-General to deliver this message to member states and all other UN organizations.

== Themes ==
As of 2012, each World Autism Awareness Day has focused on a specific theme determined by the UN.

- 2012: "Launch of Official UN "Awareness Raising" Stamp"
- 2013: "Celebrating the ability within the disability of autism"
- 2014: "Opening Doors to Inclusive Education"
- 2015: "Employment: The Autism Advantage"
- 2016: "Autism and the 2030 Agenda: Inclusion and Neurodiversity"
- 2017: "Toward Autonomy and Self-Determination"
- 2018: "Empowering Women and Girls with Autism"
- 2019: "Assistive Technologies, Active Participation"
- 2020: "The Transition to Adulthood"
- 2021: "Inclusion in the Workplace"
- 2022: "Inclusive Quality Education for All"
- 2023: "Transforming the narrative: Contributions at home, at work, in the arts and in policymaking"
- 2024: "Moving from Surviving to Thriving: Autistic individuals share regional perspectives"
- 2025: "Advancing Neurodiversity and the UN Sustainable Development Goals (SDGs)"
- 2026: "Autism and Humanity – Every Life Has Value."

== Controversy ==
The terms "Autism Awareness Day" and "Autism Awareness Month" are sometimes contested by autism rights activists, who claim that they feed into ableism against autistic people. Such groups, including the Autistic Self Advocacy Network (ASAN), advocate using the term World Autism Acceptance Day as a counter-celebration for both events under the belief that it promotes overcoming anti-autistic prejudice rather than simply increasing awareness of autism.

== Outcomes in the United States ==
In a 2015 presidential proclamation, President Obama highlighted some of the initiatives that the U.S. government was taking to protect the rights of autistic people and bring awareness to the disorder. He highlighted things like The Affordable Care Act, which prohibits health insurance companies from denying coverage based on a pre-existing condition such as autism. He also pointed out the Autism CARES Act of 2014, which provides higher-level training to those who provide support to autistic people.

On 2 April 2025, President Donald Trump proclaimed the day in the United States. ASAN criticized Trump's proclamation for not stressing acceptance, not addressing autistic people directly, focusing only on children, claiming there had been "a staggering increase" in autism prevalence (without discussing the role of expanded diagnostic standards and access) and whitewashing administration policies hostile to autistic people.

== Gallery ==
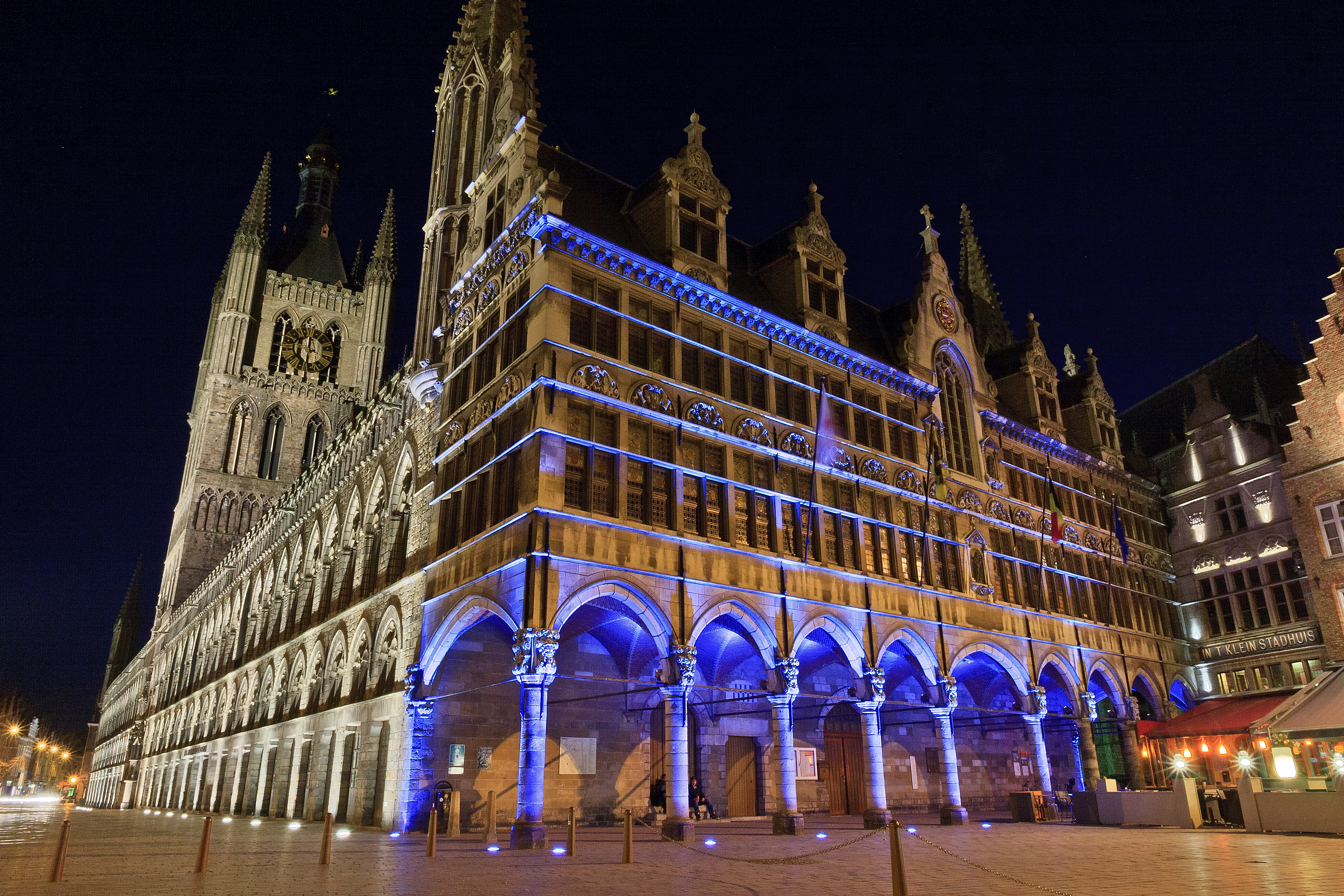
The Cloth Hall and adjoining Nieuwerck in Ypres, Belgium, illuminated for World Autism Awareness Day on 2 April 2013.

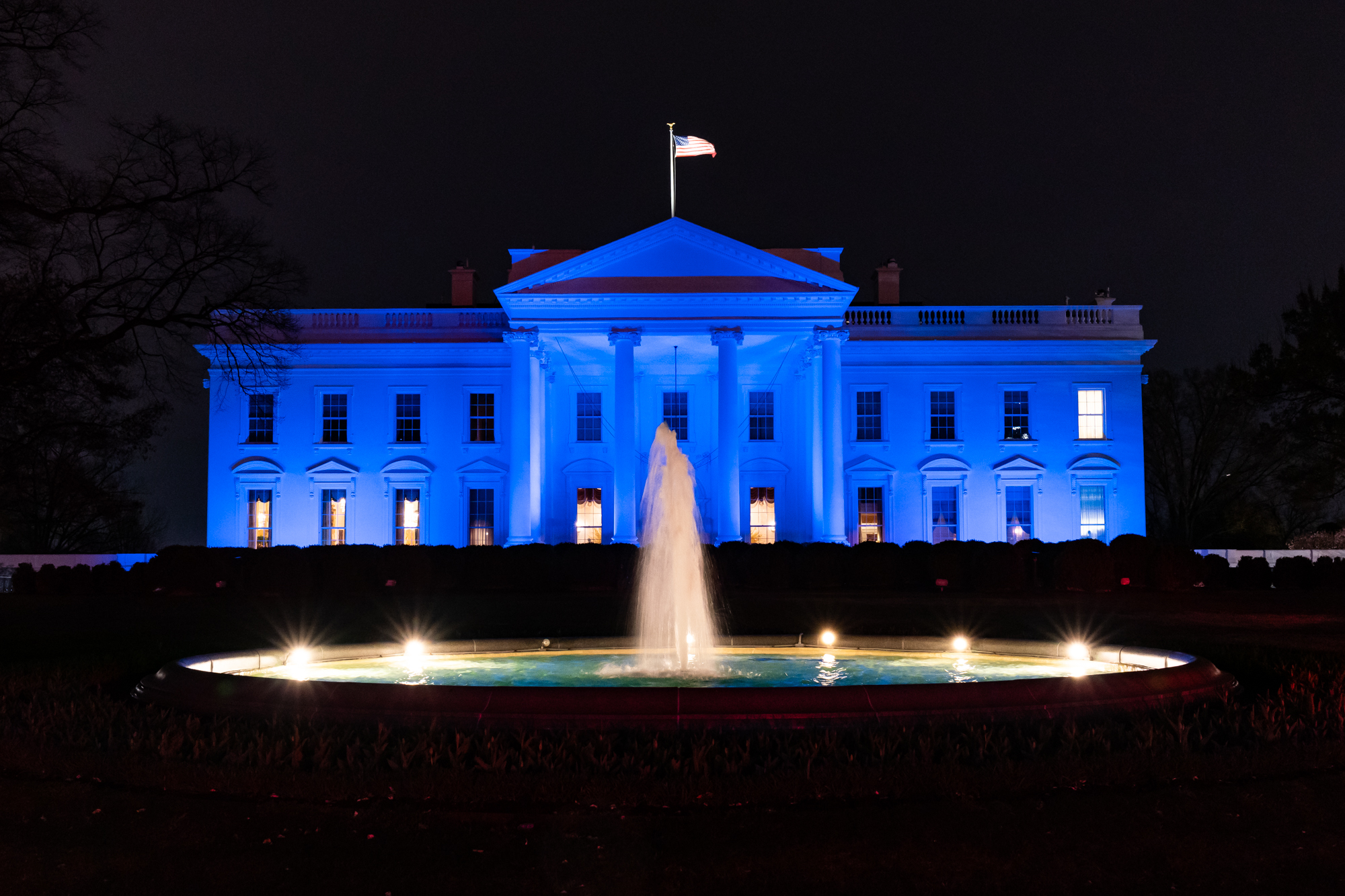
The White House in Washington, D.C., United States, illuminated for World Autism Awareness Day on 2 April 2019.

Tokyo Tower in Tokyo, Japan, illuminated for World Autism Awareness Day on 2 April 2024.

== See also ==
- Awareness day
- Autism-friendly
- Autism Sunday
- Autistic Pride Day
- Autistic rights movement
- Societal and cultural aspects of autism
- United Nations' International Day of Persons with Disabilities
- Autism awareness and recognition events
