= Autistic Pride Day =

Annual celebration held on 18 June

Autistic Pride Day is a pride celebration for autistic people held annually on 18 June. Autistic pride recognises the importance of pride for autistic people and its role in bringing about positive changes in the broader society.

== Concept ==
Organisations around the world celebrate Autistic Pride Day with events to connect with one another, and demonstrate to allistic (non-autistic) people that autistic people are not in need of a cure.

Autistic pride points out that autistic people have always been an important part of human society. Being autistic is a form of neurodiversity. As with all forms of neurodiversity, most of the challenges autistic people face come from other people's attitudes about autism and a lack of supports and accommodations (ableism), rather than being essential to the autistic condition. For instance, according to Larry Arnold and Gwen Nelson, many autism-related organizations promote feelings of pity for parents, rather than fostering understanding. Autistic activists have contributed to a shift in attitudes away from the notion that autism is a deviation from the norm that must be treated or cured. Autistic self-advocacy organizations, which are led and run by autistic people, are a key force in the movement for autistic acceptance and autistic pride.

Joseph Redford, an organiser for Autistic Pride at London's Hyde Park, stated in a speech that the concept of autistic pride is not about a single day or event:

For individuals, Autistic Pride doesn't necessarily need to take the form of public events. The organiser of Inverness Autistic Pride, Kabie Brook, told me that she celebrated Autistic Pride day by taking a walk in the park with her family. And enjoying herself. Openly stimming, or vocalising or expressing yourself in your own body language is an example of Autistic Pride in Action. Standing up and passionately defending your own truth, regardless of convention or tone, or social dynamics even if it goes completely against the grain, or others consider it minor or pedantic, is Autistic Pride in Action. Seeking knowledge according to your own logic is Autistic Pride in Action. Completely breaking social rules, if it doesn't cause harm, is Autistic Pride in Action. Demanding to be treated with the same respect and dignity as others is Autistic Pride in Action. Walking away from something if you can't handle it is Autistic Pride in Action.

== Origin ==
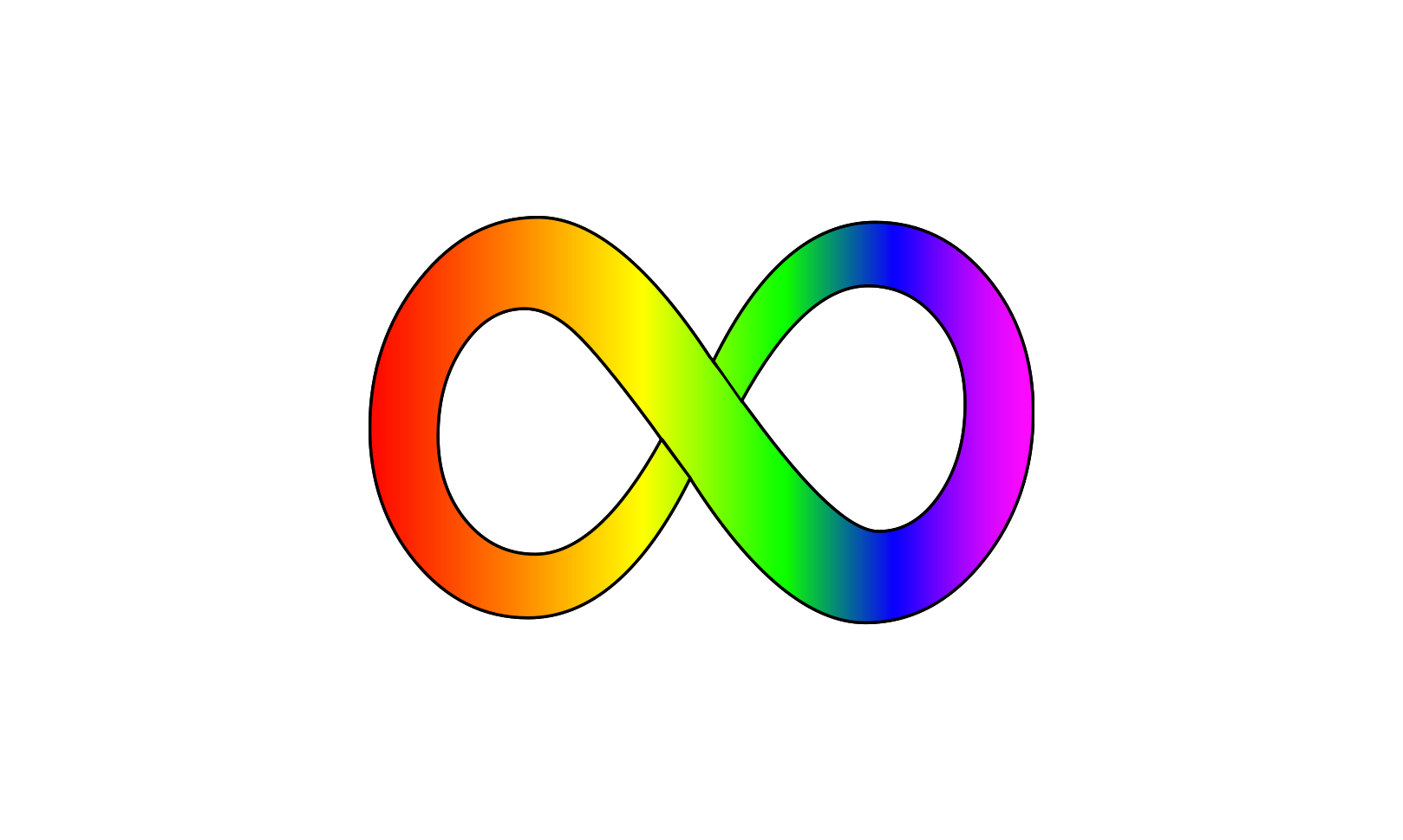
The first Autistic Pride Day in 2005 used a flag with a rainbow infinity symbol, created by Aspies For Freedom. Many variants have since been created, such as this design from 2013.

Autistic Pride Day was first celebrated in 2005, by Aspies For Freedom (AFF), who selected 18 June because it was the birthday of the youngest member of the group at that time. AFF modelled the celebration on the gay pride movement. According to Kabie Brook, the co-founder of Autism Rights Group Highland, "the most important thing to note about the day is that it is an autistic community event: it originated from and is still led by autistic people ourselves", i.e. it is not a day for other charities or organisations to promote themselves or stifle autistic people. The rainbow infinity symbol is used as the symbol of this day, representing "diversity with infinite variations and infinite possibilities". New Scientist magazine released an article entitled "Autistic and proud" on the first Autistic Pride Day that discussed the idea.

== Development ==
Official Autistic Pride Day logo (Australia)

As autistic pride has continued to develop, autistic advocates have become increasingly professionalised, with Autistic Pride Reading incorporating as a charity in 2018, and holding a pride event which attracted over 700 people.

During the COVID-19 pandemic, with physical events impossible, autistic advocates collaborated under the Autistic Pride Alliance to create an Autistic Pride Online Celebration which hosted speakers from four continents. Autistic Pride Day 2020 was an eleven-hour marathon that was hosted on YouTube and the event was repeated in 2021.

In Australia, an official Autistic Pride Day organization was created in 2023 in partnership with the City of Sydney. The organization released an official logo for the event, featuring three concentric infinity symbols, which are coloured with a gradient of red and green, intentionally avoiding the blue that was long associated with Autism Speaks.

== Events ==
There have been a number of Autistic Pride Day events hosted over the years to promote the self-affirmation, identity, dignity and equality of autistic people around the world. Most events happen during the summer months between June and August.

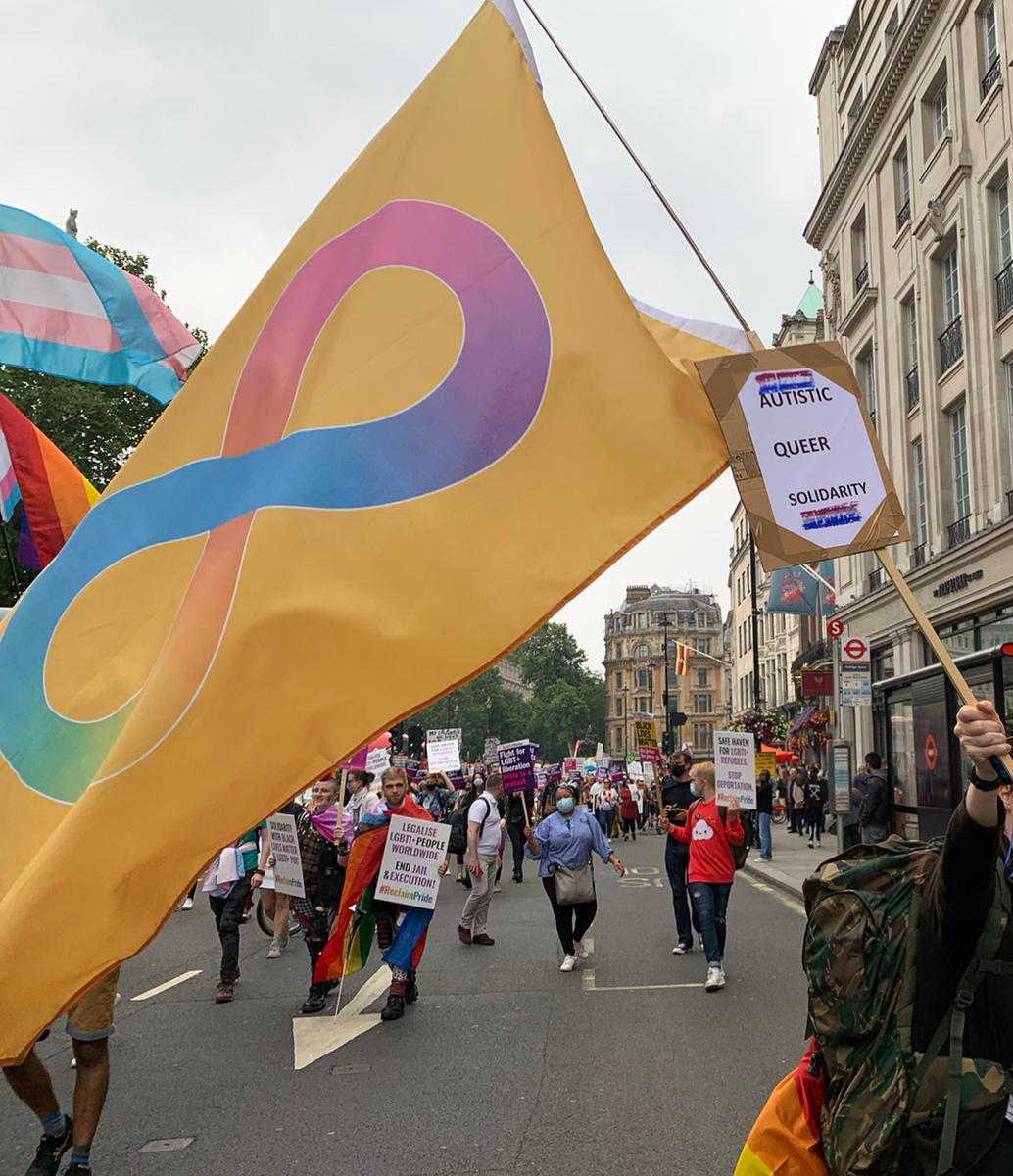
Autistic pride flag at Pride is a Protest march in July 2021

List of Autistic Pride events
Year		Hosted by
2024	Autistic Pride Day Symposium – Melbourne	Autistic Pride Day (Australia)
2024	Autistic Pride Day – New York City (Cadman Plaza) – 15 June 2024	Autistic Adults NYC
2024	Pic-nique des Fiertés Autistes (Paris) – 23 June 2024	Réseau CLE Autistes
2023	Autistic Pride London	Joseph Redford & Autistic Empire
2023	Bath Spa Autistic Pride	AutWell
2023	Pic-Nique des Fiertés Autistes (Paris)	Réseau CLE Autistes
2023		Autistic Pride at Pride (Kingston upon Hull)
2023	Autistic Pride Day Melbourne	Autistic Pride Day (Australia)
2022	Autistic Pride London	Joseph Redford & Autistic Empire
2021	Autistic Pride Alliance Online	Autistic Pride Alliance
2020	Autistic Pride Online Celebration	
2019	Autistic Pride Picnic at London Charlton House (AIM)	Autistic Inclusive Meets (AIM)
2019	Autistic Pride Eastbourne	Eastbourne Asperger's Support Group
2019	Fifth Annual Autistic Pride Picnic at London Hyde Park	Joseph Redford
2019	Autistic Pride Reading	Autistic Pride Reading Charity
2019	Autistic Pride Brighton	Adrie van der Meer

== See also ==
- Autistic rights movement
- Autistic Self Advocacy Network – seeks to advance the principles of the disability rights movement in the world of autism
- Autism Sunday
- Outline of autism
- Autism awareness and recognition events
