= Aspies For Freedom =

Autism rights group

- Formation: 2004; 22 years ago
- Founder: Amy Nelson, Gwen Nelson
- Website: www.aspiesforfreedom.com

Aspies For Freedom (AFF) is a solidarity and campaigning group aligned with the autistic rights movement. The aim of AFF is to teach the public that autism is not always a disability and that there are advantages as well as disadvantages. The group organizes an annual Autistic Pride Day and opposes attempts to cure autism.

== History ==
Established in 2004 by Amy and Gwen Nelson, AFF has received coverage from publications, such as New Scientist magazine. As of August 2007, The Guardian estimated the group's membership at 20,000.

== Activism ==
Gwen Nelson has made internet parodies of controversial non-profit organization Autism Speaks, saying that they were silencing opposing views. AFF petitioned the United Nations in 2004 to have members of the autistic community recognised as a minority status group. Gwen Nelson and AFF have spoken out against prenatal genetic testing for autism, portraying it as a difference as opposed to a disease.

== See also ==
- Anti-psychiatry
- Autism friendly
- Controversies in autism
- Neurodiversity
- List of autism-related topics
- List of autism organizations
