= Autism Sunday =

Christian day of prayer for the well-being of autistic people

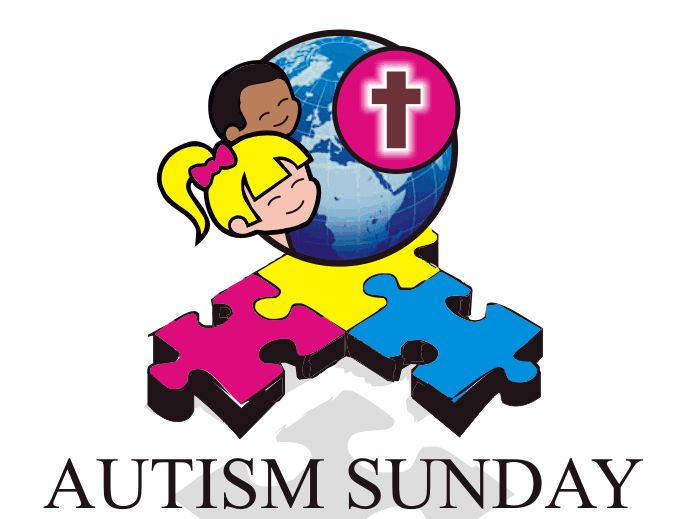
- The International Day of Prayer for Autism and Asperger Syndrome
- Date: Second Sunday in February
- 2025 date: 9 February
- 2026 date: 8 February
- 2027 date: 14 February
- 2028 date: 13 February
- Frequency: annual

Autism Sunday, also known as the International Day of Prayer for Autism and Asperger Syndrome, is an event observed annually on the second Sunday of February.

== History ==
Autism Sunday was first held in 2002 during Autism Awareness Year in the United Kingdom. It was initiated by parents and carers Ivan Corea and Charika Corea, founders of the Autism Awareness Campaign UK. Parents of Charin, a teenager with autism spectrum disorder and a communication disorder, urged leaders of religious organisations, churches, community groups and world leaders around the globe to speak up for people with autism spectrum disorders.

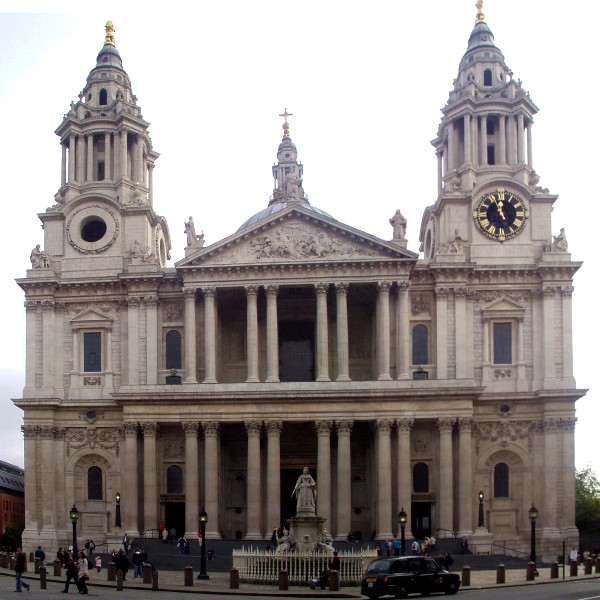
The first-ever service for Autism Sunday was held at St Paul's Cathedral, London in 2002 Autism Awareness Year, UK, initiated by parents and carers Ivan Corea and Charika Corea.

The first service for autism was held in February 2002 at St Paul's Cathedral in London. Former Education Ministers, peers from the House of Lords, celebrities, writers, broadcasters, the media, and others prayed at St Paul's Cathedral for children and adults with autism spectrum disorders, as well as their parents and caregivers.

In 2008, the first Early day motion on Autism Sunday was tabled in the House of Commons, in the Palace of Westminster. The motion, EDM 874, was sponsored by David Drew MP and signed by 71 members of Parliament. It calls on the Government to work with all faith communities in order to reach out to parents, caregivers and people with autism spectrum disorders in local communities, and urges church leaders and community groups of all denominations to engage with people with autism spectrum disorders. The British Prime Minister, David Cameron extended his personal support for Autism Sunday.

== Debate in the House of Commons ==
Autism Sunday was mentioned in a debate in the House of Commons in the British Parliament. David Taylor MP mentioned the day and called for action stating that the "Churches and other religious organisations will be supporting an international day of prayer for those with autism and Asperger's syndrome. Will the Leader of the House take this as a bid as a topical debate on the issue, which affects hundreds of thousands of people throughout the country? The conditions are under-recognised and under-resourced and they badly need a national strategy, a national task force and a well resourced plan for the future."

In reply, the Leader of the Commons, Harriet Harman MP said: "For many years, families have struggled to support and care for children with autism, often to a great extent on their own and without the proper back-up of integrated services. There is now a great deal more awareness of the difficulties of autism and Asperger's syndrome, and a recognition of the importance of early diagnosis and integrated services. I congratulate the Churches on picking this for an international day of prayer, and we would like to work with the Churches, local government and the voluntary sector to ensure that families with a family member who develops autism or Asperger's have the backing that they need in future."

== International Day of Prayer for Autism and Asperger Syndrome ==
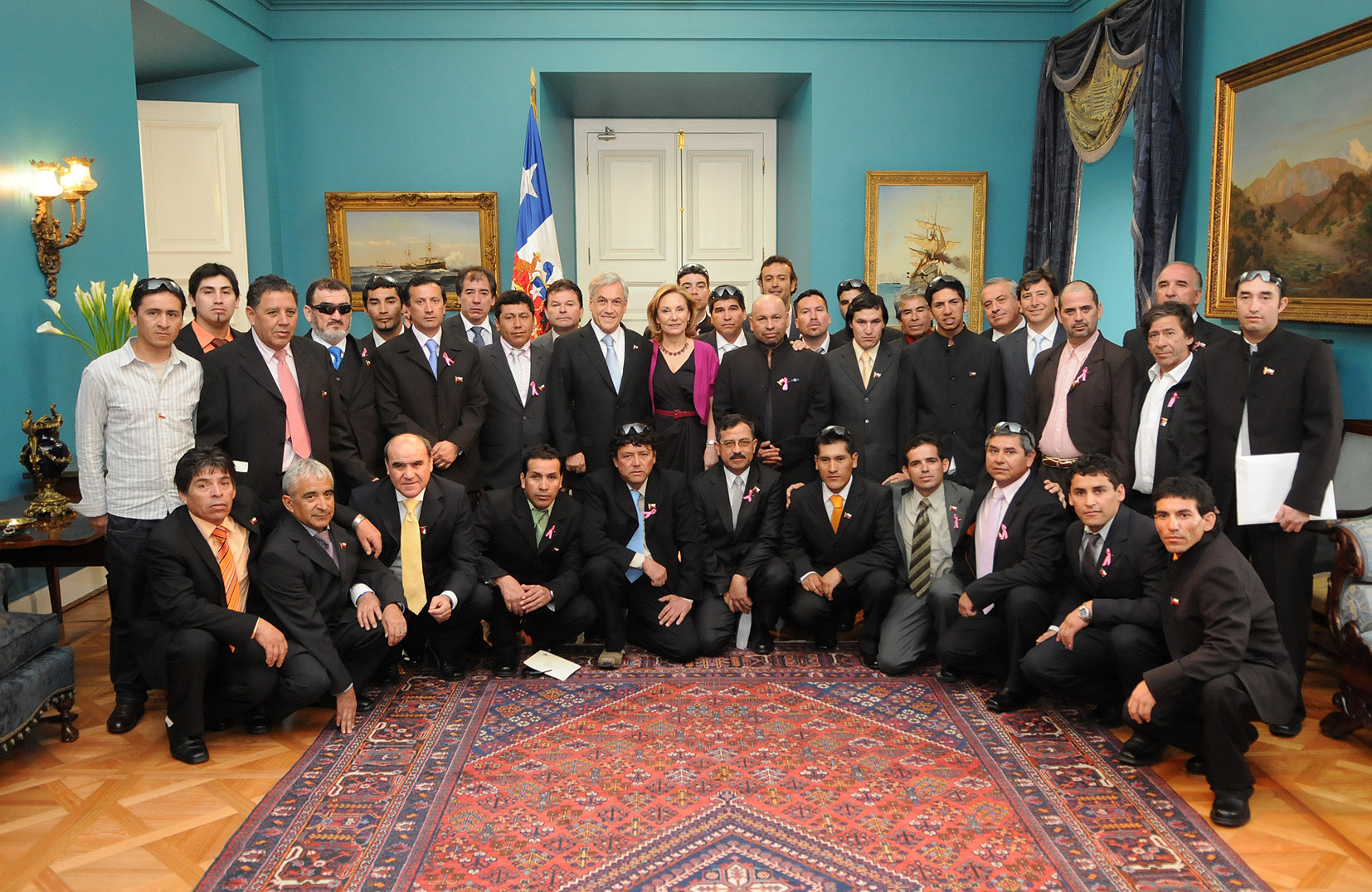
Chilean Miner Jose Henriquez, standing second from right, here with the President of Chile and the 33 rescued miners - Henriquez sent a special message of support for Autism Sunday 2011 and was presented with his first autism awareness ribbon - during his UK tour in January 2011.

Autism Awareness Ribbons are worn on Autism Sunday.

Churches of all denominations around the world now honor the millions of people with autism on Autism Sunday, the International Day of Prayer for Autism and Asperger Syndrome. Organisers estimate there are 60 million people with autism around the world. Campaigners have said that many suffer without proper public services in education, health, specialist speech therapy and respite care in several parts of the world, particularly in Africa and Asia. The credit crunch and the global recession which hit many countries in 2008-2009 also affected the Autism Community. In the UK, people were concerned about the cuts to disability benefits and cuts to public services. Homes were re-possessed during the economic downturn and some families below the poverty line had to choose between heating and eating.

World church leaders have been supporting Autism Sunday. Pope Benedict XVI told the organisers that he would be praying for the autism community on Autism Sunday. Some of the largest churches in the United States, including Rick Warren's Saddleback Church, have pledged to pray for over 60 million people with autism spectrum disorders on Autism Sunday. Support came from the Bishop of London in the United Kingdom, Right Reverend Richard Chartres.

The organizers have urged parents, carers and the worldwide Autism Community to use Autism Sunday as a platform to lobby and campaign on the serious issues. Support for Autism Sunday 2011 came from the Chilean Miner, Jose Henriquez, the 24th miner to be rescued from the San Jose mine. Henriquez was invited by US President Barack Obama to address the Presidential Prayer Breakfast in February 2011. He met Ivan Corea and Charika Corea, the Founders of Autism Sunday in the UK, prior to his departure to Washington, D.C. They presented him with his first-ever autism awareness ribbon. The news of the presentation was relayed by the media in Chile. Jose Henriquez released a special message in support of Autism Sunday 2011.

Campaigners around the world organized an Autism Sunday Twitter Storm to mark Autism Sunday 2011 - to celebrate the lives of all people with autism. In 2022, a commemorative event has been planned in India.

== See also ==
- Autism
- Autistic Pride Day
- World Autism Awareness Day
- Autism awareness and recognition events
