= Ivan Corea (campaigner) =

Autism awareness campaigner

- Born: Sri Lanka
- Education: S. Thomas' College, Mount Lavinia; Chalfonts County Secondary School Chalfont; St. Peter's Buckinghamshire; Archbishop Tenison's Grammar School Croyden; Brunel University, Greenwich University
- Known for: Founder, Autism Awareness Campaign UK; UK Autism Foundation, Autism Sunday; 1981 nominee for the UN Media Peace Prize
- Board member of: UK Autism Foundation (former Chair of Trustees); Autism Awareness UK; (former Chair)

Ivan Corea is a campaigner, philanthropist, and former board member chair of Autism Awareness UK. He has established autism-related charities and service organizations, including the Autism Awareness Campaign UK and Autism Sunday.

== Education ==
Corea was born in Colombo, Sri Lanka and educated at S. Thomas’ Preparatory School, Kollupitiya and S. Thomas' College, Mt Lavinia. His classmates included Uthum Herat, Suresh Thambipillai and R. D. Gunaratne.

Corea's family emigrated to the United Kingdom, and he attended Chalfonts County Secondary School in Chalfont, St. Peter's Buckinghamshire and Archbishop Tenison's Grammar School in Croydon. He went on to attend Brunel University and Greenwich University.

== Autism ==
Corea has received recognition for his work in autism, including the Charity Times Charity Personality of the Year Award, the Windrush Community Service Award, the Beacon Fellowship Highly Commended Award, and the Daily Mail Unsung Heroes Award Certificate. He was honoured as an 'Autism Light' by the blog 'Autism Light' which honours people who have campaigned for autism awareness.

He has a record of over 25 years of service as an educator and is a former Fellow of the King's Fund in London. He has advised Her Majesty's Government as a Consultant to the Ethnic Minorities Division of the Department for Work and Pensions and a Task force of Ministers.

== Journalism ==
Corea's work includes contributions to the Third World Impact books, published in the United Kingdom, and the Visible Minority Report, presented to the Commonwealth Heads of Government Meeting in Kuala Lumpur. In 1981 he was nominated for the United Nations Media Peace Prize in London.

== London 2012 Ambassador ==
Corea was appointed an Olympic Ambassador by Lord Sebastian Coe in 2004 and was involved in persuading the public, particularly minority ethnic communities and disability communities in the United Kingdom, to back the London 2012 Olympic and Paralympic bid.

== Family ==
Corea and his wife Charika were inspired to initiate their autism awareness campaign by their son Charin, who is autistic.

Corea is the son of Vernon Corea, a broadcaster who worked at Radio Ceylon (SLBC), Radio Worldwide and the British Broadcasting Corporation. He is the grandson of the clergyman Ivan Corea who was Rural Dean of Colombo of the Church of Ceylon and was Examining Chaplain to the Bishop of Colombo, the nephew of Ambassador Ernest Corea, who was his father's younger brother, and the great-grandson of Dr. James Alfred Ernest Corea.

In 2016 the family moved to California to follow a theology course.
