= Communication Shutdown =

Autism charity fundraiser

Communication Shutdown is a global fundraiser on behalf of autism-related organizations in more than 40 countries. Beginning in 2010, the day is commemorated by individuals voluntarily refraining from using social media such as Facebook or Twitter for one day on 1 November.

The concept of the event is based on the idea that social communication is difficult for autistic people. Going without social networks for one day is therefore a perspective-taking exercise for people not on the spectrum.

== Aim and participation ==
The aim of the event is to raise awareness about autism and also drive donations for autism services via the purchase of a social network app.

The Communication Shutdown charity app provides a shutdown badge to wear online, adds participants to a global mosaic next to high-profile supporters, as well as other ways to show support.

High-profile supporters in 2010 included Buzz Aldrin, Fran Drescher, Miranda Kerr, Holly Robinson-Peete, Steven Seagal, Deepak Chopra and Temple Grandin.

Global autism partners include members of Autism Europe, Autism Initiatives UK, Autism Awareness Australia, The ASHA Foundation India and grassroots organisations in America including the HollyRod Foundation, Giant Steps and the Autism Society of Colorado.

== Counter-movement ==
A movement initiated by Corina Lynn Becker prior to the first Communication Shutdown event advocates for renaming the day as Autistics Speaking Day. The focus is shifted to autistic individuals, who are encouraged to become more active on social media and to describe their experiences during a time when there are fewer neurotypical voices in the mix. Notable participants include Ly Xīnzhèn M. Zhǎngsūn Brown and Ari Ne'eman.
