= Autism Network International =

Advocacy organization run by and for autistic people

Autism Network International's logo

Autism Network International (ANI) is an advocacy organization run by and for autistic people. ANI's principles involve the anti-cure perspective, the perspective that there should not be a goal to "cure" people of autism.

== History ==
ANI was started by Jim Sinclair, Kathy Grant, and Donna Williams in 1992. The advocacy group is organized by autistic people for autistic people. ANI started out as a pen pal group, but when they first met in person, "they felt a sense of belonging, of being understood, of having the same concepts and sharing a language, of being normal." Sinclair and the other founders created an online community where participants could discuss issues in the online forum. ANI began publishing a physical newsletter, called Our Voice.

ANI is responsible for coining the phrase "neurologically typical". Sinclair used ANI to help focus on the positive benefits of being autistic, rather than the negatives. ANI has helped autistic individuals learn "the important lesson of delighting in a shared autistic culture".

== Autreat ==
Autreat was a United States retreat and conference hosted by Autism Network International for autistic people. The first Autreat was in 1996, and was held at Camp Bristol Hills in New York. In 1999, there were 80 attendees, with one woman traveling from as far as Japan. Autreat was held annually between 1996 and 2013, with the exception of 2001.

Autreat was a conference for autistic people "designed by autistic people". It was a contrast to other autism conferences, which ANI believes are typically about autistic people but are intended for parents and professionals. Although parents, professionals, and others were welcome, Autreat was specifically designed for autistics, and offers an "autism-friendly" environment, free of sensory bombardment. Common autistic mannerisms, like exceedingly literal conversation and hand-flapping, are to be expected. Common sources of autistic irritation, like casual hugs and fluorescent lighting, are not allowed.

Guests were under no pressure to interact socially. A simple visual code in the form of a colored badge was used to indicate members who wish to interact with anyone and everyone, those who wish not to be approached by strangers, and those who wish not to be approached at all. Autreat helped allow autistic individuals a "place to pursue and enjoy a nonconforming subculture".

Autreat inspired similar programs such as AutCon in the western United States, as well as in other countries, such as Autscape in England, Projekt Empowerment in Sweden and AUTcamp in Italy.

== See also ==
- List of disability organizations
- Neurodiversity
- Autism awareness and recognition events
