= Controversies in autism =

Controversies about both the causes and diagnoses of autism

Diagnoses of autism have become more frequent since the 1980s, leading to various controversies in autism about both its causes and the nature of the diagnoses themselves. Whether autism has mainly a genetic or developmental cause, and the degree of coincidence between autism and intellectual disability, are all matters of scientific controversy and inquiry. There is also more sociopolitical debate as to whether autism should be considered a disability on its own.

== Epidemiology ==
The prevalence of autism spectrum disorder (ASD) was approximately 3.2% in the US in 2025 among 8 year olds. ASD averages a 3.4:1 male-to-female ratio. The number of children diagnosed with autism has increased dramatically since the 1980s, and the reasons for this increase are unclear. Part of it is due to changes in diagnostic practice; however, other unidentified environmental risk factors may exist given that there have been significant increases in the prevalence even for time periods when diagnostic criteria have remained stable. The risk of autism is associated with several prenatal factors, including advanced parental age and diabetes in the mother during pregnancy. A diagnosis of ASD also results in higher likelihood of being diagnosed with several genetic disorders, epilepsy, schizophrenia, and gastrointestinal issues.

== Genetics ==
The role of genetic influence on ASD has been heavily researched over the past few years. ASD is considered to have polygenic traits since there is not a single risk factor, but multiple ones.

Multiple twin and family studies have been conducted in order to observe heritability of ASD. The chance of both twins having ASD was significantly higher in identical twins than fraternal twins, concluding that ASD is partially heritable. Loss of function variants occur in 16-18% of ASD diagnoses, which is nearly double the normal population. These loss of function variants reduce function in the protein neurexin, which connects neurons at the synapse and is important for neurological development; deletion mutations of neurexin are also very common in autistic people, as well as other neurological disorders like schizophrenia, bipolar disorder, and attention deficit hyperactivity disorder.

There is also controversy over the nature vs. nurture debate. According to family studies, genetic and environmental factors have an equal influence on the risk of ASD.

== Bacteria ==
Gut microbiome has a relation to ASD. Excessive Clostridia spp. was found in children with ASD and gastrointestinal difficulties; Clostridia spp produces propionic acid, which is impaired or in excess in people with ASD. Specifically, C. tetani and C. histolyticum are two species of this bacteria that affect people with ASD. C. tetani produces tetanus neurotoxin in the intestinal tract; C. histolyticum is a toxin producer that is abundant in people diagnosed with ASD. Both of these could contribute to neurological symptoms.

== Vaccines ==
A later-retracted article from The Lancet making false claims provoked concern about vaccines among parents. Its author, Andrew Wakefield, was found to be on the payroll of litigants against vaccine manufacturers.

The idea of a link between vaccines and autism was extensively investigated and shown to be false. The scientific consensus is that there is no relationship, causal or otherwise, between vaccines and incidence of autism, and vaccine ingredients do not cause autism.

Nevertheless, the anti-vaccination movement continues to promote myths, conspiracy theories, and misinformation linking the two. A developing tactic appears to be the "promotion of irrelevant research [as] an active aggregation of several questionable or peripherally related research studies in an attempt to justify the science underlying a questionable claim."

== Intelligence ==
The percentage of autistic individuals who also meet criteria for intellectual disability has been reported as anywhere from 25% to 70%, a wide variation illustrating the difficulty of assessing autistic intelligence.

A 2007 study suggested that Raven's Progressive Matrices (RPM), a test of abstract reasoning, may be a better indicator of intelligence for autistic children than the more commonly used Wechsler Intelligence Scale for Children (WISC). Researchers suspected that the WISC relied too heavily on language to be an accurate measure of intelligence for autistic individuals. Their study revealed that non-autistic children scored similarly on both tests, but the autistic children fared far better on the RPM than on the WISC. The RPM measures abstract, general and fluid reasoning, an ability autistic individuals have been presumed to lack. A 2008 study found a similar effect, but to a much lesser degree and only for individuals with IQs less than 85 on the Wechsler scales.

== Facilitated communication ==
Facilitated communication (FC) is a scientifically discredited technique that attempts to facilitate communication by people with severe educational and communication disabilities. The facilitator holds or gently touches the disabled person's arm or hand during this process and attempts to help them move to type on a special keyboard. It was used by many hopeful parents of autistic individuals when it was first introduced during the early 1990s by Douglas Biklen, a professor at Syracuse University.

There is widespread agreement within the scientific community and multiple disability advocacy organizations that FC is not a valid technique for authentically augmenting the communication skills of autistic people. Instead, research indicates that the facilitator is the source of the messages obtained through FC (involving ideomotor effect guidance of the arm of the patient by the facilitator). Thus, studies have consistently found that patients are unable to provide the correct response to even simple questions when the facilitator does not know the answers to the questions (e.g., showing the patient but not the facilitator an object). In addition, numerous cases have been reported by investigators where disabled persons were assumed by facilitators to be typing a coherent message while the patient's eyes were closed or while they were looking away from or showing no particular interest in the letter board. Despite the evidence opposing FC, many continue to use and promote this technique.

Facilitated communication is separate and different from a range of scientifically supported augmentative and alternative communication (AAC) devices and processes that facilitate communication for people with communication difficulties.

== Advocacy initiatives ==
There are two major conceptualizations of autism within autism advocacy. Those who favour the pathology paradigm, which aligns with the medical model of disability, see autism as a disorder to be treated or cured. Those who favor the pathology paradigm argue that atypical behaviors of autistic individuals are detrimental and should therefore be reduced or eliminated through behavior modification therapies. Their advocacy efforts focus primarily on medical research to identify genetic and environmental risk factors in autism. Those who favour the neurodiversity paradigm, which aligns with the social model of disability, see autism as a naturally occurring variation in the brain. Neurodiversity advocates argue that efforts to eliminate autism should not be compared, for example, to curing cancer, but instead to the antiquated notion of curing left-handedness. Their advocacy efforts focus primarily on acceptance, accommodation, and support for autistic people as "neuro-minorities" in society. These two paradigms are not fully exclusive, and many people hold a combination of these viewpoints.

=== Pathology paradigm ===
The pathology paradigm is the traditional view of autism through a biomedical lens, in which it is seen as a disorder characterized by various impairments, mainly in communication and social interaction. Those taking this perspective believe that autism is generally a harmful dysfunction. Ways of functioning which diverge from a typical brain are perceived as harmful and disordered and must therefore be treated or cured. The atypical behaviors of autistic individuals are considered a detriment to social and professional success and should therefore be reduced or eliminated through autism therapies.

Advocates with this view include both a small but significant minority of autistic adults and large majority of parents of autistic children, but contain a higher percentage of parents when compared to those adopting the neurodiversity paradigm. These advocates believe that medical research is necessary to address the rapid rise in autism diagnoses (sometimes referred to as the "autism epidemic"), reduce suffering, and provide the best outcomes for autistic individuals. In addition to etiological research, other areas of focus may include biology, diagnosis, and treatment, including medication, behavioural and psychological interventions, and the treatment of co-existing medical conditions.

Advocacy groups that focus or have focused primarily on medical research include Autism Speaks and its predecessor organizations, the Autism Coalition for Research and Education, the National Alliance for Autism Research and Cure Autism Now. They also include the Autism Science Foundation and the Autism Research Institute.

=== Neurodiversity paradigm ===
The neurodiversity paradigm is a view of autism as a different way of being rather than as a disease or disorder that must be cured. Autistic people are considered to have neurocognitive differences, which give them distinct strengths and weaknesses, and are capable of succeeding when appropriately accommodated and supported.

There is no formal leader of the neurodiversity movement and little academic research has been conducted on it as a social phenomenon. As such, proponents of the neurodiversity paradigm have heterogenous beliefs, but are consistent in the view that autism cannot be separated from an autistic person. Advocacy efforts may include accommodations in schools and work environments, lobbying for the inclusion of autistic people when making decisions that affect them, and opposition to therapies that aim to make children "indistinguishable from their peers".

Neurodiversity advocates are opposed to medical research for a cure, believing that it will lead to eugenics, and instead support research that helps autistic people thrive as they are. For example, NeuroTribes author Steve Silberman noted a lack of research in regards to seizure-controlling drugs and autistic brains; that sensory differences in autistic people were unheard of until Temple Grandin spoke about her experiences; and that only a small percentage of research funding goes towards the needs of autistic adults.

Advocacy groups that focus primarily on acceptance and accommodation include Autism Network International, the Autism National Committee, the Autistic Self Advocacy Network, and the Autistic Women & Nonbinary Network.

== See also ==
- Neurodiversity
- Employment of autistic people
