= Autism in psychoanalysis =

Psychoanalytic theories and treatment of autism

In psychoanalysis, the concept of autism is closely linked to the term autoeroticism, which was adopted by Sigmund Freud from the physician and sexologist Havelock Ellis. Autism and childhood psychosis were rediscovered in the United States during the 1950s within the framework of Freudian orthodoxy, notably through the work of Margaret Mahler. Psychoanalytic studies, particularly by Anglo-Saxon post-Kleinian analysts such as Frances Tustin, Donald Meltzer, and Donald Winnicott, followed. Bruno Bettelheim holds a distinctive place in this history. In France, influenced by the theories of Jacques Lacan, autism was notably explored by psychoanalyst Françoise Dolto.

Psychoanalytic work with autism focuses on using verbal communication (or alternative means of symbolization in more severe cases) to help the subject manage their symptoms and, where possible, reduce their impact.

The psychoanalytic approach to autism has been widely discredited and is considered to have contributed to mistreatment of autistic children. Despite this, it remains prevalent in France. According to The Guardian, France lags "50 years behind" in supporting autistic individuals, describing it as a "state scandal". The influence of psychoanalysis in autism treatment in France has been cited as a violation of the rights of autistic individuals. Nevertheless, some psychoanalysts continue to defend their practices.

The psychoanalytic framework for autism began to decline in the 1970s, particularly in the United States, but it remains prominent in two regions: France and Latin America. The application of psychoanalytic theories to autism in the 1950s and 1960s, combining child psychiatry (Kanner) and psychoanalysis (Bettelheim), led to the controversial refrigerator mother hypothesis, which blamed mothers for autism. This became a central point of contention for many French parent advocacy groups opposing psychoanalysis. Autobiographies by autistic adults such as Josef Schovanec, Hugo Horiot, and Gunilla Gerland describe suffering during psychoanalytic treatment, though some positive experiences, such as that of Donna Williams, who incorporated psychoanalytic terms or interpretations, have also been reported. Criticisms also target the psychoanalytic concept of psychosis and the ineffectiveness of psychoanalytic practices in addressing autism.

In December 2020, the University of Cambridge published an article titled "Psychoanalysis in the treatment of autism: why is France a cultural outlier?" to examine why France continues to use an approach discredited for decades due to a lack of scientific evidence and its potential to harm autistic children. The authors argue that psychoanalysis in France is shielded from criticism by political and academic networks.

== 1907–1944: Between sexology, psychoanalysis, and psychiatry ==
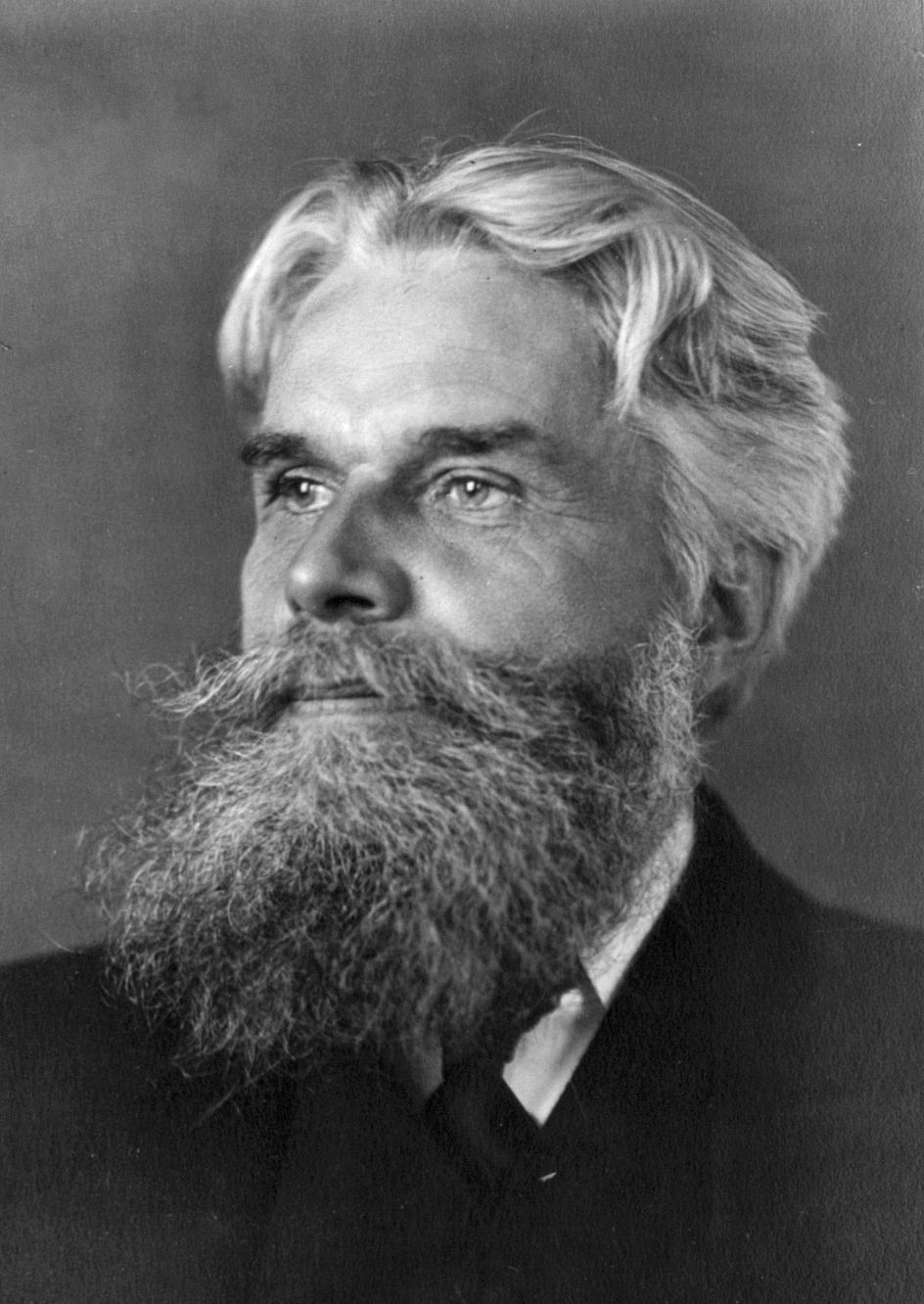
Physician and sexologist Havelock Ellis, who introduced the concept of autoeroticism

The concept of autism emerged through evolving perspectives in psychoanalysis and psychiatry, stemming from the notion of autoeroticism developed by Sigmund Freud, who never directly addressed autism. Freud adopted the term "autoeroticism" from physician and sexologist Havelock Ellis, but psychiatrist Eugen Bleuler rejected its sexual connotations, coining "autism" by abbreviating and contracting "autoeroticism" (removing "eroticism").

=== From Freudian autoeroticism to autism by Bleuler, Kanner, and Asperger ===
The concept of autism originated at the Burghölzli Psychiatric Clinic in Zurich, directed by Eugen Bleuler, who coined the term "autism". Bleuler's rejection of the psychoanalytic emphasis on sexual drives in Freud's concept of autoeroticism, contrasted with his preference for "ipsism" in psychiatry, distinguished psychoanalytic and child psychiatric approaches. In 1943, Leo Kanner formally identified a childhood disorder as "autistic disturbances of affective contact", while Hans Asperger presented a report in 1944 on "autistic psychopathy in childhood".

==== Freud, Jung, Bleuler ====
The term "autism" (from Greek autos, meaning "self") was coined by Swiss psychiatrist Eugen Bleuler and first appeared in a 13 May 1907 letter from Carl Gustav Jung to Sigmund Freud. Bleuler found Freud's autoeroticism, borrowed from Havelock Ellis, "too sexual" and created "autism" by combining "auto" and "eroticism" (replacing the latter), after considering "ipsism" from Latin. Freud retained "autoeroticism", while Jung adopted the term introversion.

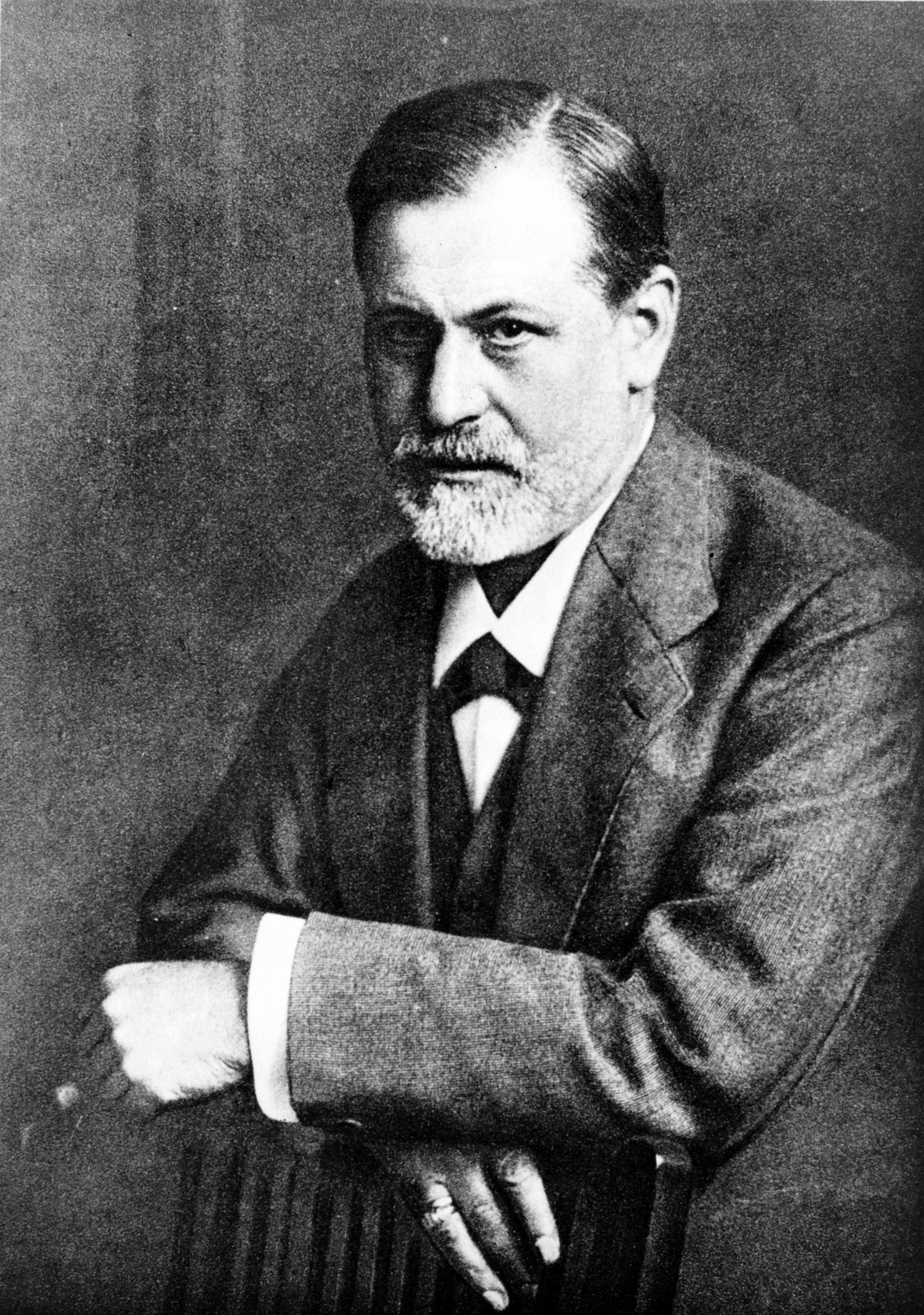
Freud's concept of autoeroticism, adopted from Havelock Ellis, remained central to psychoanalysis.

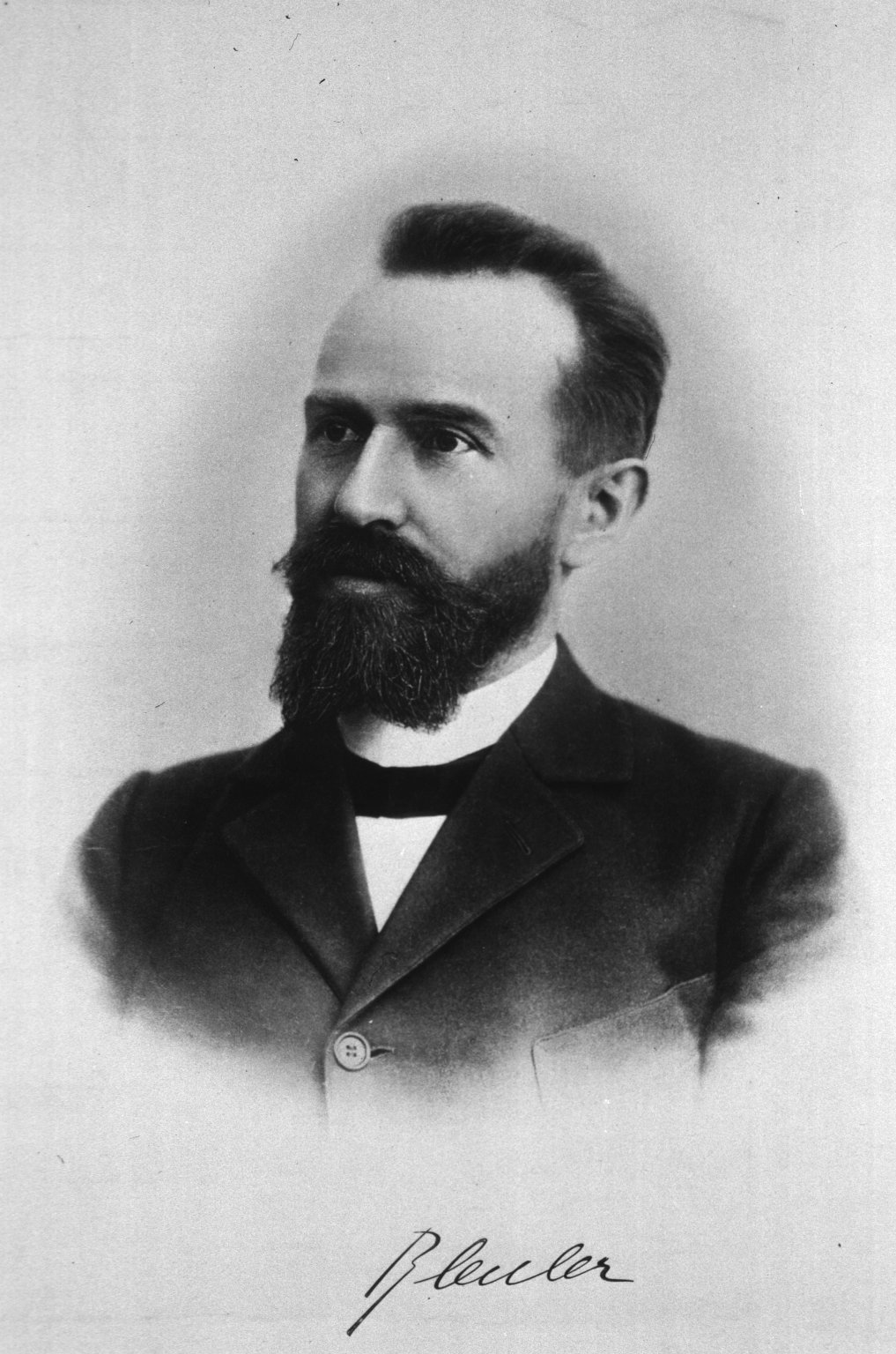
Swiss psychiatrist Eugen Bleuler coined "autism", rejecting autoeroticism as "too sexual".

===== Between Freud's autoeroticism and Bleuler's autism =====
In his 1911 work Dementia praecox oder Gruppe der Schizophrenien, Eugen Bleuler defined "autism" (German: Autismus), derived from Greek autos ("self"), as a detachment from reality coupled with a predominance of inner life, noting it as roughly equivalent to Freud’s autoeroticism. According to Jacques Hochmann, Bleuler, familiar with Freud's theories, clarified that autism approximated Freud's autoeroticism but sought to distance it from Freud's broad sexual framework to avoid misinterpretations.

===== Jung’s conflict with Freud over dementia praecox =====
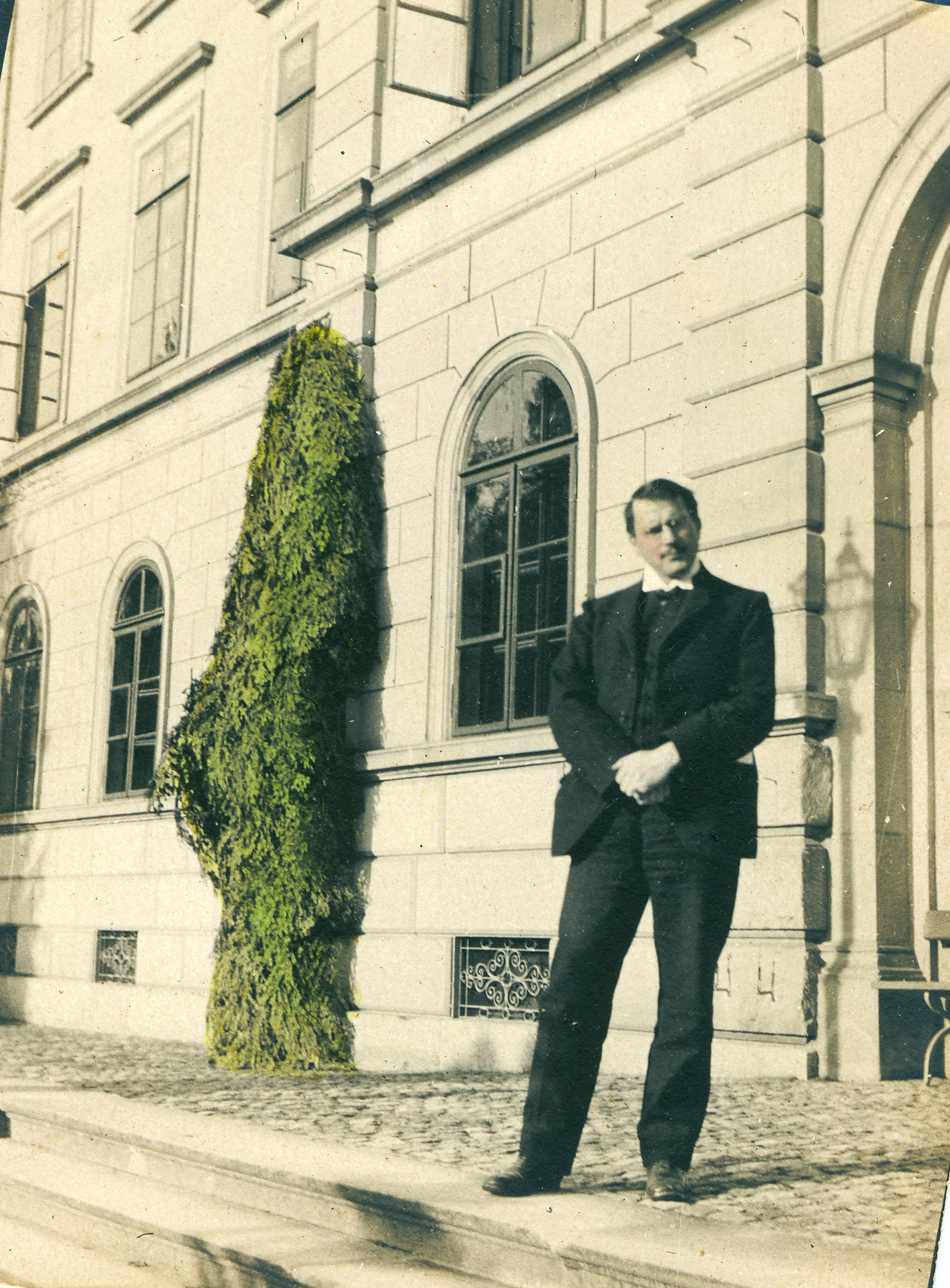
Carl Gustav Jung, close to psychoanalysis until his break with Freud (here at Burghölzli in 1910).

At Burghölzli, Carl Gustav Jung worked under Bleuler on dementia praecox (schizophrenia) and published The Psychology of Dementia Praecox in 1906. Tasked by Bleuler to engage with Sigmund Freud, Jung, initially aligned with Freud, parted ways around 1911–1913, partly due to theoretical disagreements over libido in dementia praecox. Jung argued that Freud's drive-based libido theory failed to explain dementia praecox, while Freud was developing his 1914 work Introducing Narcissism. In psychoanalysis, narcissism is defined as a necessary developmental stage transitioning from autoeroticism to object love.

==== Kanner: Early infantile autism ====
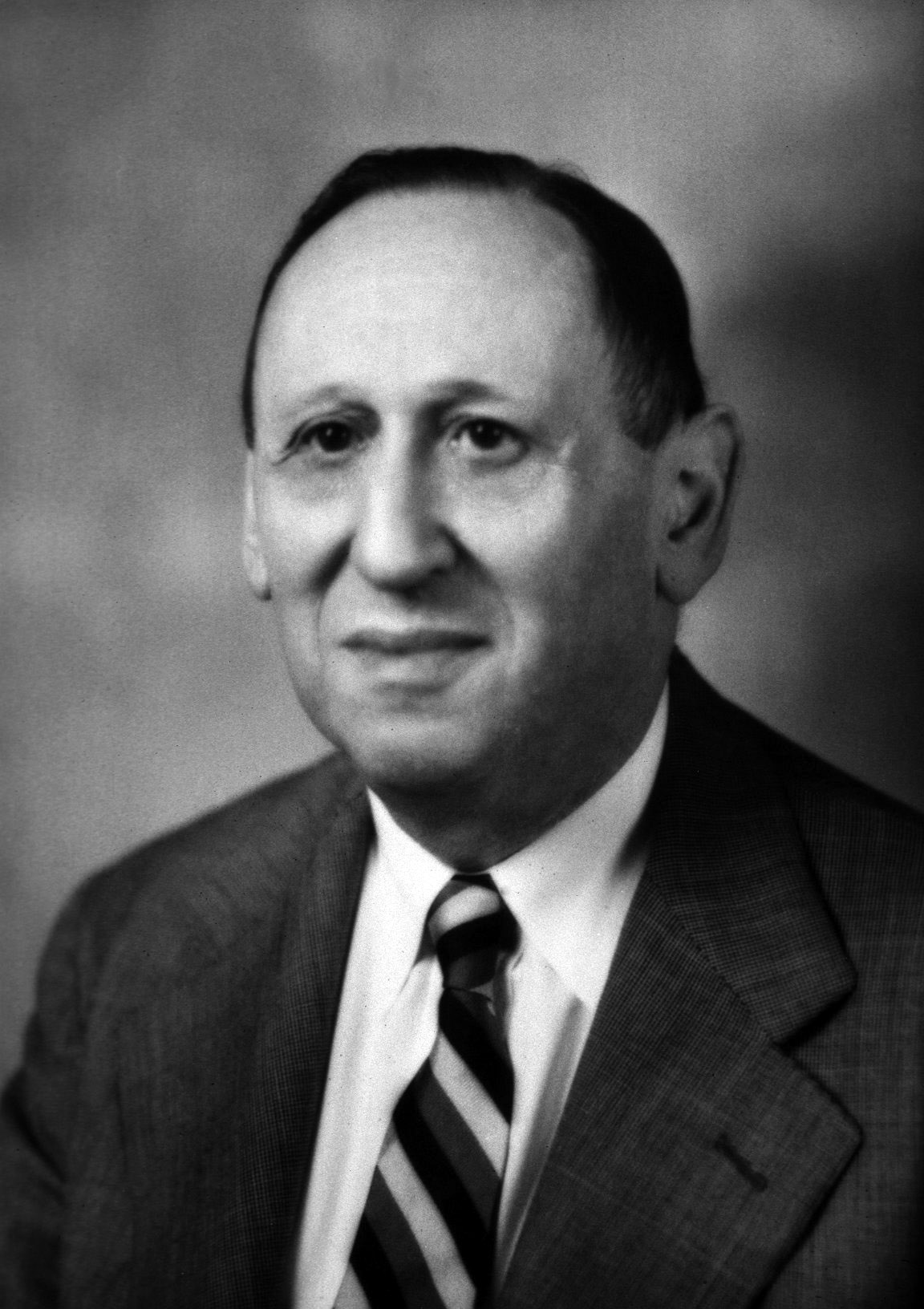
In 1943, Leo Kanner, a child psychiatrist, described early infantile autism.

In 1943, Leo Kanner adopted the term "autism" to describe "early infantile autism", a syndrome involving impaired communication, social behavior, and cognitive functions. French child psychiatrist and psychoanalyst Didier Houzel notes that psychoanalytic research has significantly advanced the understanding of early psychic development. However, Steve Silberman argues that Kanner's initial focus on parental roles in his autism model reflected the dominance of psychoanalytic theory, which attributed disorders to parental psyche, overshadowing alternative models.

Jacques Hochmann notes that by the early 1960s, an anti-psychoanalytic movement emerged in the United States. The decline of psychoanalysis in public opinion and psychiatry was compounded by the fragility of American Freudianism, as noted by Élisabeth Roudinesco and Michel Plon. Neuropathologist Manuel F. Casanova and his team highlight that Bernard Rimland, a psychologist and father of an autistic child, collaborated with Kanner to challenge psychoanalytic dominance. In 1964, Rimland published a manifesto debunking psychoanalytic ideologies and documenting genetic causes of autism, founding the Autism Society of America in 1965.

==== Asperger's report and its legacy ====
In 1944, Hans Asperger presented a report in Vienna on "autistic psychopathy in childhood" (Die Autistischen Psychopathen im Kindesalter), which remained obscure for four decades. According to Élisabeth Roudinesco and Michel Plon, Asperger described a "high-functioning autism" characterized by intact language and exceptional memory, exemplified by the character Raymond Babbitt in the 1988 film Rain Man. This claim of Asperger's own autism is disputed by Edith Sheffer. Asperger's report discussed autistic psychopathy, later termed high-functioning autism and Asperger syndrome. Rediscovered in the late 1970s by Lorna Wing, a psychiatrist and parent of an autistic child, it was translated into English by Uta Frith and published in 1981. Frith, trained in cognitive psychology, added diagnostic criteria, including the absence of theory of mind. Her student Tony Attwood refined the description, which gained widespread recognition with his 2008 book. Paul Alerini notes the emergence of a global "Asperger community" and a growing list of notable individuals identified with the condition.

== From the 1950s: Anglo-Saxon psychoanalysis and autism ==
The Anglo-Saxon approach to autism emerged shortly after Leo Kanner's 1943 description of early infantile autism and Hans Asperger's 1944 report in Vienna.

Autism and childhood psychosis were rediscovered in the United States during the 1950s within the framework of Freudian orthodoxy. Margaret Mahler's work made the psychoanalytic treatment of childhood psychosis widely accepted. According to Élisabeth Roudinesco and Michel Plon, the Annafreudian and Kleinian schools, alongside Bruno Bettelheim, most effectively studied and treated autism using psychoanalytic tools, often with success.

Investigative journalist Steve Silberman notes that psychoanalytic analyses of autistic individuals began in the 1930s, with Hermine Hug-Hellmuth, Anna Freud, and Melanie Klein interpreting their young patients' behaviors through a Freudian lens. For example, Klein interpreted a boy's fascination with door handles as symbolizing sexual penetration of his mother.

=== Margaret Mahler: The "normal autistic phase" of infancy ===
Margaret Mahler’s work on symbiotic psychosis represents the Annafreudian approach. According to Didier Houzel, Mahler positioned early infantile autism as a stage in psychic development, progressing from a "normal autistic phase" to "separation-individuation".

American pediatrician and psychoanalyst Margaret Mahler theorized the separation-individuation process in the first three years of life, drawing on Anna Freud, Heinz Hartmann, René Spitz, and, to a lesser extent, Donald Winnicott. She described the end of the "normal autistic phase" around three to four months, when separation begins. During this phase, the infant is highly focused on interoceptive and proprioceptive sensations. Mahler described this phase as a monadic system, self-sufficient in its hallucinatory satisfaction of desires. Her work highlighted the infant's competencies in perception, cognition, and social interaction.

=== The Kleinian school ===
==== Melanie Klein: "Childhood psychosis" ====
According to psychiatrist and psychoanalyst Paul Alerini, Melanie Klein made childhood psychosis a viable concept by developing a dissident theory relative to Freudian orthodoxy, incorporating an early superego, a pre-Oedipal phase, and an initial schizo-paranoid position with splitting between good and bad objects within the mother's womb. Jacques Hochmann notes that in 1929, Klein presented "the case of Dick" at an international congress in Oxford, likely the first autistic child to undergo psychoanalytic treatment, though Klein labeled him "schizophrenic". Hochmann adds that as child psychoanalysis developed, Donald Meltzer and Frances Tustin focused on autistic children, enriching psychopathology semiology without attributing autism to maternal attitudes. Psychoanalyst Marilia Franco E. Silva credits Klein's concept of projective identification with significant theoretical and clinical advances in psychosis. However, post-Kleinians questioned Klein's assumption of an innate ego when addressing phenomena like echolalia and echopraxia in autistic children.

==== Post-Kleinians ====
===== Frances Tustin =====
Frances Tustin, trained under Wilfred Bion (who was analyzed by Melanie Klein), distinguished several types of autism, only one corresponding to Leo Kanner’s description:

- Abnormal primary autism: No differentiation between the child’s body, the mother’s, and the external world.
- Secondary encrusted autism (similar to Kanner’s autism): The lack of differentiation between the child’s ego and the mother is replaced by an overemphasis on difference, creating an autistic barrier as a protective shell against the external world.
- Secondary regressive autism or childhood schizophrenia: Development begins normally but regresses, with the child retreating into a rich, body-sensation-focused fantasy life. Élisabeth Roudinesco and Michel Plon note that Tustin viewed this as a form of schizophrenia underpinned by projective identification.

Didier Houzel highlights Tustin's identification of a fantasy of discontinuity in autistic children, experienced corporeally as a "tearing away of their own substance". In infancy, when symbolization is limited, the continuity of "mouth-tongue-nipple-breast" is disrupted, leading to a catastrophic fantasy of a "broken nipple" and a "torn-off nipple". This leaves a "black hole inhabited by persecutory objects" in the mouth, prompting the autistic child to construct a delusion of fusion with the environment to negate separation, using secretions (tears, saliva, urine, feces) and autistic objects for "surface sensations". Tustin termed this "perverse autosensuality".

In 1999, Gunilla Gerland, identifying as having high-functioning autism or Asperger syndrome, published an open letter in the journal Autism, criticizing a positive review of Encounters with Autistic States: A Memorial Tribute to Frances Tustin by Theodore and Judith L. Mitrani. Tustin's work, devoted to understanding the autistic child's bewildering world, promoted a psychodynamic theory of autism caused by poor mother-child relationships, later disproven.

===== Donald Meltzer =====
Donald Meltzer, a colleague of Melanie Klein and Wilfred Bion who taught at the Tavistock Clinic for over 20 years, contributed significantly to autism research, building on Klein's object relations and Esther Bick’s concept of the skin-ego. He proposed that autistic individuals experience their bodies intensely and may perceive others’ projections as intrusive, disrupting their access to the external world.

=== Bruno Bettelheim: A "personal" approach to autism ===
Bruno Bettelheim, a self-taught educator and philosopher identifying as a psychotherapist, has a controversial status as a psychoanalyst. Drawing on his traumatic internment at Dachau, he proposed an extreme method to counter autism, which he likened to a destructive environment: “If a harmful environment can destroy personality, a particularly favorable one should rebuild it.”

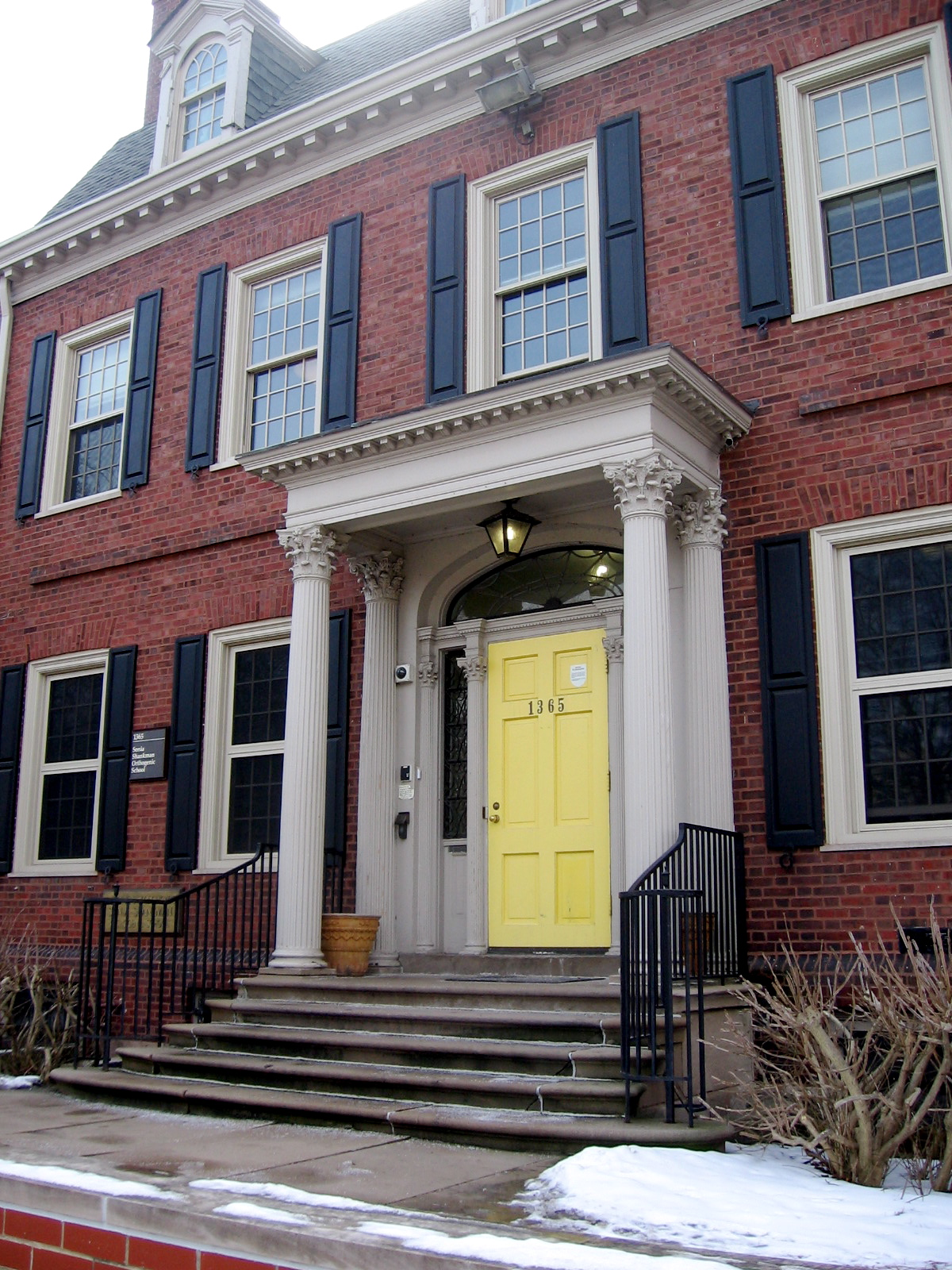
The Sonia Shankman Orthogenic School in Chicago, Illinois, where Bruno Bettelheim developed his autism treatment method.

Bettelheim, the first to advocate for autonomy and against institutional neglect of autistic individuals, held a complex and marginal position. At the Orthogenic School, he focused on education and institutional psychotherapy rather than strict psychoanalysis, adapting it freely in a way that paradoxically contradicted psychoanalytic principles. He wrote that he modified psychoanalysis to treat severely disturbed children. Influenced by John Dewey, Maria Montessori, and Jean Piaget, Bettelheim emphasized an educational over a therapeutic approach.

==== Bettelheim's influence in France until the 1980s ====
Bettelheim gained significant media attention in France in 1974. Historian Jonathyne Briggs notes that while his theories were increasingly sidelined in the United States for neuroscience and behavioral psychology, they gained traction in France, where psychoanalysis dominated childhood psychosis treatment. Bettelheim's ideas were widely influential in France for three decades until challenged in the 1990s by French parent associations and media. In the U.S., autism treatment shifted to educational methods. Dominique Bourdin suggests that some psychoanalysts’ defense of Bettelheim’s theories fueled opposition from French parent associations, sometimes aggressively, against psychoanalytic approaches to autism. These theories were gradually abandoned in France. However, Jean-Noël Trouvé notes that in 2015, they persisted in some "hardcore" psychopathology circles.

==== Criticism of Bettelheim since the 1980s ====
Bettelheim's theory posited that autism resulted from a lack of parental, particularly maternal, love. His methods, involving separating children from their families and blaming mothers as "pre-morbid" and "death-dealing", drew significant criticism. Richard Pollak’s article, republished in Le Livre noir de la psychanalyse, and Agnès Fombonne’s work highlighted the violence of his practices and their role in guilt-tripping mothers.

Bettelheim and his Orthogenic School colleagues claimed to "cure autism", attributing positive outcomes in half their cases to their methods. Biographies also accused him of mistreating autistic children. Pollak notes that by 2005, the refrigerator mother theory was abandoned in countries like the United States, United Kingdom, and Japan, but persisted in France, where some psychiatrists and psychoanalysts continued to hold parents responsible for autism.

The French National Consultative Ethics Committee's Opinion No. 102, issued in November 2007 by Jean Claude Ameisen, criticized Bettelheim's ideas for causing undue suffering to mothers and contributing to inadequate educational support for autistic children in France.

Autistic advocate Michelle Dawson analyzed the shift in stigma from parents to autistic individuals in her essay Bettelheim's Worst Crime, stating: “We’ve moved from the ‘refrigerator mother’ to the ‘autistic poltergeist’. Once blamed by Bettelheim as the cause of autism, parents are now seen as heroic victims. Leveraging society’s leniency toward heroes and martyrs, parents have evaded accountability to autistics, controlling research and public agendas. A catastrophic view of autism makes scrutiny of parental claims unlikely and deemed reprehensible.”

=== 1970s shift in the United States: Decline of psychoanalytic theories and rise of savant autism ===
In the 1970s, Laurent Mottron describes the onset of the “scientific period of autism”. Psychoanalytic theories, highly influential in child psychiatry early in the 20th century, experienced a "spectacular reversal". With the rise and establishment of cognitive science, the psychodynamic hypothesis was abandoned, and the DSM was revised to re-medicalize psychiatry.

Psychoanalysts Myriam Perrin and Gwénola Druel-Salmane note that a new signifier, intelligence, became associated with autism. In 1971, Leo Kanner reported that three children from his 1943 study achieved autonomy by leveraging their "obsessionality" practically. The discovery of savant autism overturned the Anglo-Saxon psychoanalytic view of autism as severely deficient, previously described as cases of "idiot savants" or "cured" autistic children with high intellectual potential (e.g., Tustin, 1972).

== Autism in psychoanalysis today: Situation and controversies ==
=== Criticism of the psychoanalytic approach ===
==== Criticism of psychoanalytically inspired "treatment" ====
According to Casanova et al., the application of psychoanalytic theories, which often advocate for family separation, has exposed autistic children to interventions that can be distressing. Steve Silberman cites the example of one of Ole Ivar Løvaas's autistic patients, who experienced both the consequences of interpreting self-harming behaviors through a psychoanalytic lens (parental separation and attribution of behavior to internalized guilt) and the application of early Applied behavior analysis (ABA), which used punishment to stop self-harm.

Psychoanalytic practice has historically viewed autism as an affective disorder requiring exclusively psychiatric intervention, sidelining other potential causes, such as genetic research. This exclusivity in treatment approaches over decades led to severe criticism from the Haute Autorité de santé (French National Authority for Health) on 6 March 2012.

Historian Richard Bates (2018) argues that France's lag in respecting the fundamental rights of autistic individuals—such as access to education, independent living, and diagnosis—is due to the influence of psychoanalysis, particularly the theories of Jacques Lacan and Françoise Dolto. Child psychiatrist and psychoanalyst Didier Houzel noted in 2018 that "the application of psychoanalysis to the treatment of autistic individuals persists despite widespread criticism."

==== Criticism of the application of psychoanalytic theories ====
The concept of autism has faced significant shifts in clinical acceptance within psychiatry, fluctuations in psychoanalytic conceptions, and conflicts between practitioners and parents, culminating in France with political intervention by the Haute Autorité de santé.

Three intertwined issues have sparked intense controversy in the transition from theory to application:

- Causality: The etiological origins, particularly the accusation of mothers.
- Classification: Whether autism should be included among psychoses.
- Social Conflict: A clash of perspectives over the relevance and necessity of specific treatments.

According to Silberman, the rise of the neurodiversity movement in the United States indirectly stems from successive definitions of autism in the DSM. The DSM-III, heavily influenced by psychoanalytic theories and Leo Kanner's work, gained global traction due to its more inclusive diagnostic criteria. The DSM-IV, which removed psychoanalytic references, introduced even broader criteria. In France, practitioners often rely on the CFTMEA, which remains steeped in psychoanalysis. Sociologist Gil Eyal notes that, based on a comparison of autism diagnoses across 17 developed countries from 1966 to 2001 by Éric Fombonne, France had the lowest autism prevalence, attributed to the prestige of psychoanalysis, the specificity of CFTMEA criteria, and the high rate of institutionalization of autistic individuals, the highest in Europe.

Internationally, autism is no longer classified as a psychosis but as a neurodevelopmental disorder. However, some French psychoanalysts argue that "there is neither clinical nor theoretical evidence to consider autism outside the scope of early psychoses."

Bishop and Swendsen emphasize that autistic children are "defenseless against the analyst’s interpretation of their thoughts and motivations," which lack scientific validation. They argue that, in its extreme forms, psychoanalysis can harm parents, particularly mothers, who are demonized as both overly involved and overly distant, as well as the children themselves.

Drawing on a comparison between Frances Tustin's psychoanalytic theories and developmental psychology and neuroscience, Dianna T. Kenny (University of Sydney) argues that psychoanalytic studies of child development rely on "erroneous theorization and a failure to integrate scientific research on child development into their theories and practice." She concludes that adherence to Tustin's theories has led to "misconceptions of successful therapeutic outcomes."

===== On "parentectomies" =====
The application of theories blaming "toxic motherhood" led to "parentectomies," involving the separation of autistic children from their families and placement in institutions. These separations caused significant suffering for autistic children and their families. Attempts at "rebirthing therapies" in the United States, involving placement with new families, were inconclusive or increased suffering. In France, the Rachel affair is described by Christine Philip as emblematic of abusive placements justified by psychoanalytic frameworks, as "professionals in key positions are predominantly trained in the psychoanalytic approach, leading to significant difficulties for families."

==== From theory to etiology (criticism) ====
British clinical psychologist Thomas Richardson, citing Peter Hobson (2005), notes that many early psychoanalysts believed autism was psychogenic, a view that persists in some psychoanalytic approaches. Donald Meltzer (1975) proposed an etiological model based on the dismantling of the ego, suggesting autistic children fragment their sense of self across different senses, impairing their perception of the world. Frances Tustin (1977) posited that autistic infants protect themselves from fears of discontinuity between their body and the external world by creating an illusion of oneness with their environment.

While autism is defined as a clinical condition, debates persist about whether it is acquired or innate, with some referring to "autisms" in the plural. In 1906, Carl Jung suggested an indeterminate causality, possibly involving metabolic factors or organic brain predispositions. In 1943, Leo Kanner described autism as an innate "autistic disturbance of affective contact," though he also contributed to the narrative blaming mothers.

According to Lise Demailly (2019), members of the PRÉAUT association, such as Marie Allione, argue that autism is curable.

===== On Kanner's "refrigerator mother" theory and its legacy =====
Leo Kanner described autism as a disease akin to phenylketonuria, characterized by an "innate disturbance of communication." However, he initially noted that parents, particularly mothers, exhibited a "superficially affectionate, cold, or 'refrigerator'-like demeanor," with fathers often described as intellectual and preoccupied. Jacques Hochmann clarifies that the term "refrigerator" originated with Kanner, not Bruno Bettelheim, to whom it is often misattributed. Kanner wrote that parents of autistic children appeared "left neatly in refrigerators which did not defrost," suggesting their withdrawal was a response to such parenting.

By 1958, Yale University's autism treatment unit was dominated by psychoanalytic teachings. Neurologist Mary Coleman suggests Kanner was influenced by the antifeminist aspects of psychoanalytic theory, leading to a strong bias against mothers. Bruno Bettelheim, a self-taught psychotherapist, popularized the idea that autism stemmed from maternal behavior, drawing parallels with his own experience of internment in a Nazi concentration camp. He argued that autism resulted from a child's reaction to a mother's attitude, stating, "Throughout this book, I maintain that the precipitating factor in infantile autism is the parents' desire that the child not exist."

The "refrigerator mother" theory became closely associated with psychoanalytic approaches, particularly in France. This theory lacks empirical support, as demonstrated by Allen et al. (1971), which found no psychological differences between parents of autistic or intellectually disabled children and control groups. The theory fueled parental activism in the 1980s and 1990s, with media amplifying their revolt. The 2002 documentary Refrigerator Mothers highlighted the emotional scars inflicted on mothers post-diagnosis, spurring further activism against psychoanalytic approaches.

Psychoanalysts Perrin and Salmane argue that Bettelheim's theses, though highlighted by critics, remained marginal even among psychoanalysts. Conversely, Bishop and Swendsen assert their influence remains significant in France. Psychiatrist-psychoanalyst Abram Coen claimed in 2004 that psychoanalytically inspired practitioners had abandoned these theories, emphasizing ethical respect for patients and families. However, Bishop and Swendsen, commenting on a 2020 article by Didier Houzel, argue that claiming psychoanalysis does not blame parents is disingenuous, as the role of parents, especially mothers, as causal factors remains central to French psychoanalytic work with children.

This parental blame persists in France, as evidenced by sociologist Cécile Méadel's 2005 study of Autisme France's discussion lists, Sophie Robert's documentaries (2012–2018), and testimonies from parents like Francis Perrin.

==== Debates on the effectiveness of psychoanalysis ====
In 2004, psychotherapist Paula Jacobsen's comparative study concluded that psychoanalytic approaches were ineffective for Asperger syndrome. In 2008, Thomas Richardson compared psychoanalytic and cognitive approaches, noting that neither can claim to cure autism, though cognitive approaches show greater potential for improving outcomes. Tony Attwood (2012) advised against mother-child psychoanalytic therapy for Asperger syndrome to avoid unnecessary maternal guilt, stating that psychoanalytic techniques generally struggle with such patients.

The Haute Autorité de santé’s March 2012 report found the efficacy of psychoanalysis for autism "unproven," classifying psychoanalytic approaches and institutional psychotherapy as "non-consensual global interventions" due to a lack of efficacy data and divergent opinions. Since then, three studies have supported the efficacy of psychoanalytically inspired approaches for autistic children, cited below (Thurin, Cornet, Touati).

A 2014 study by J.-M. Thurin et al., published in Neuropsychiatrie de l’enfant et l’adolescent, examined 50 autistic children undergoing psychotherapy for one year, primarily by psychoanalytically trained therapists (82%). Psychoanalyst Sébastien Ponnou described the methodology as rigorous, meeting the American Psychological Association’s standards for intensive case studies. The study reported significant reductions in autistic behaviors, improved developmental skills, and enhanced intrapsychic functioning, suggesting increased emotional security and better engagement with the world.

However, Franck Ramus criticized the study for methodological flaws, including the lack of a control group and conflicts of interest, arguing it would not meet the standards of an international psychiatric journal.

A 2017 study in L’Évolution psychiatrique evaluated a Lacanian institutional approach at La Coursive in Liège, Belgium, involving 24 autistic children (average age: 7 years, 5 months). After two years, significant progress was reported in communication, autonomy, motor skills, and socialization, though no control group was included.

A third study (2016), also without a control group, examined a psychoanalytically oriented eclectic pediatric psychiatry practice in Paris's 13th arrondissement. Among 138 patients diagnosed with pervasive developmental disorders, 62% were classified as having "predominantly psychotic functioning," and 38% as "predominantly autistic." After an average treatment duration of 4.3 years, 20.8% showed highly positive outcomes, 39.6% positive, 30.2% moderate to low, and 9.4% no significant progress. The authors deemed these results "excellent" compared to other methods.

In April 2017, international scientists preparing France's Fourth Autism Plan unanimously agreed on the lack of evidence for psychoanalytic approaches and their potential risks. Tony Charman (King's College London) stated there is "no evidence for a psychoanalytic approach in treating young autistic children." Amaia Hervás Zúñiga (University of Barcelona) declared, "We know psychoanalysis can do nothing, and we are completely opposed to this approach." Jonathan Green noted the absence of global evidence supporting psychoanalysis, while Nadia Chabane (CHUV Lausanne) and Kerim Munir (Boston Children's Hospital) emphasized the lack of evidence and the influence of lobbies promoting such treatments. Green concluded that psychoanalytic approaches may negatively impact families.

Clarisse Vautrin, from the Zététique circle of Languedoc-Roussillon, concluded in 2019 that there are "no tangible or reproducible elements supporting psychoanalytic theories and practices," noting that while psychoanalysis is declining in French universities, it remains widely practiced.

==== Theoretical and social confrontation ====
A battle for autism exists internationally. It involves organized movements with dogmatic boundaries, though these may be more permeable than they appear. Sociologist Lise Demailly describes the controversy as a cultural specificity of France. This debate is notably absent in Quebec, where psychoanalytic approaches to autism have long been abandoned in scientific and medical communities. In France, the debate is often oversimplified as a binary opposition between CBT and psychoanalysis, though it involves broader actors, including autistic self-advocates. This opposition often fails to reflect the perspectives of autistic individuals.

French psychiatrist-psychoanalysts face strong criticism and disavowal from public authorities. On 2 April 2018, Secretary of State Sophie Cluzel stated on Europe 1 that funding hospitals using psychoanalytic approaches was "inappropriate." In 2019, Claire Compagnon, overseeing the Fourth Autism Plan, declared on Public Sénat that "psychoanalysis is not a therapeutic approach for autism." Demailly notes that psychoanalysts continue to produce significant intellectual output, though not in "scientific" journals. They have formed associations like CIPPA and allied with parent groups like "La main à l’oreille," promoting an "integrative" practice that critics view as a mask for psychoanalytic positions.

The CFTMEA, rooted in psychoanalytic theories, classifies autism among "early psychoses" alongside schizophrenia. Since 2005, the French Psychiatric Federation requires alignment with international standards (ICD-10) alongside CFTMEA. Autism is widely covered in French literature, including parental testimonies, autobiography, fiction, and comics. Notable works addressing psychoanalysis and autism include Laurent Savard's Gabin sans limites (2018) and the comic Le psychanalyste parfait est un connard (2016). Alexandra Struk Kachani notes a shift in media portrayals since the 1960s, from a psychoanalytic focus to one influenced by family perspectives, with increased attention since 2012 to the opposition between the "educational coalition" (autism as a disability requiring educational access) and the "psychoanalytic coalition" (autism as a mental illness needing medical intervention). In 2016, Psychologies Magazine editor Arnaud de Saint Simon defended psychoanalysis in an editorial.

===== Parent associations =====
Historian Jonathyne Briggs notes that French parents, especially mothers, initially collaborated with professionals, including those using psychoanalytic approaches, but later resisted as they were blamed for their children’s conditions. Demailly highlights that most French parent associations denounce mistreatment by psychiatrists, psychoanalysts, and the state. Vaincre l’autisme led efforts against packing, seen as a symbol of psychoanalytic practice. These associations influence public policy and media but often marginalize autistic voices. Autisme France has worked to reframe autism as a disability, achieved in 1996, refusing collaboration with psychoanalysts accused of parental blame.

===== Media opposition to Psychoanalysis: The documentary Le Mur (2011) =====
The 2011 documentary Le Mur by Sophie Robert sparked significant controversy in France and international media attention, with coverage in The New York Times and BBC News. Valérie Lödchen, former director of AFG Autisme, described it as using reductio ad absurdum to highlight the disconnect between psychoanalytic discourse and scientific knowledge. The documentary critiques the psychoanalytic orientation of French psychiatrists, attributing it to deficiencies in autism care and maternal suffering. Its initial ban in January 2012, later overturned, intensified the controversy.

===== Autistic networks and the autistic community =====
The autism rights movement criticizes both psychoanalysis and cognitive behavioral therapy. Researcher Alain Giami draws parallels with transgender movements in terms of demedicalization and rejection of psychoanalytic approaches. Psychoanalyst Alex Raffy notes that autistic autobiographies provide "damning testimonies" of psychoanalytic experiences, describing them as outdated Freudian dogma. Swedish autistic advocate Gunilla Gerland campaigns against psychoanalysis, stating in her 1998 manifesto that many high-functioning autistic individuals found psychoanalytic therapy unhelpful, degrading, or harmful. She describes personal suffering from four years of psychoanalytic therapy due to misinterpretations. Temple Grandin, who avoided psychoanalytic therapy, adopts a purely biological model of autism, rejecting psychodynamic theories. In his autobiography Je suis à l’Est! (2012), Josef Schovanec recounts the "psychoanalytic coldness" and misdiagnosis of schizophrenia during five years of treatment by a prominent Parisian psychoanalyst, leading to neuroleptic-induced apathy. He denounces inappropriate psychoanalytic techniques and compares psychoanalysts to shamans. Hugo Horiot's family resisted psychoanalytic influence, as seen in Françoise Lefèvre’s novel Le Petit Prince cannibale, where a phrase was censored to avoid accusations of incest. Horiot's L’empereur, c’est moi (2013) critiques psychoanalysis, particularly in the chapter "Cannibale toi-même." In Carnets d’un imposteur, he describes psychoanalysis as leaving him "defenseless" during school, with theater serving as his true therapy. In L’autisme expliqué par un autiste (2021), Thibaud Moulas argues that psychoanalysis has had a "catastrophic impact" on autistic lives, citing abusive placements misdiagnosed as psychosis or child abuse, such as the Rachel affair. He notes that French psychoanalyst Michel Botbol claimed in 2015 that Munchausen syndrome by proxy could cause autism, a belief Moulas says remains prevalent. Brigitte Chamak cautions that interpreting autistic testimonies requires context, as some may reflect external influences, such as anti-psychoanalytic parent associations. She cites an autistic individual critical of psychoanalysis yet positive about their own psychoanalytic therapy. Chamak also notes positive testimonies from autistic individuals about psychoanalytic sessions in CMPP or day hospital settings. Donna Williams, who voluntarily underwent psychoanalysis, incorporates psychoanalytic terminology in her autobiography Si on me touche, je n’existe plus and endorsed some psychoanalytic interpretations. Psychoanalyst Jacques Hochmann opposes the autistic rights movement, criticizing its "communitarianism" and influence on Autism plans in France. Josef Schovanec (EHESS) dismisses concerns about autistic communitarianism as a French fantasy, noting that Anglo-Saxon societies do not exhibit such fears.

===== On professionals =====
The distinction between psychiatrist, psychologist, and psychoanalyst is often unclear, and there is no unified consensus on psychoanalysis, particularly regarding autism. From Eugen Bleuler’s rejection of Freud's sexual symbolism in creating the term "autism," strong oppositions and varied perspectives have persisted.

====== Criticism by psychoanalysts ======
According to Henri Rey-Flaud, the focus on organic causes for autism overlooked the psychic meaning of autistic withdrawal, effectively reinforcing the exclusion of autistic individuals. In a 2013 editorial in La revue lacanienne, psychoanalyst Charles Melman noted that the Lacanian-Dolto approach to infantile autism is unpopular. He described interventions with infants showing autistic potential, conducted in the presence of parents and sometimes filmed, requiring tact to reconcile families with their child. Melman acknowledged that uncovering repressed issues has provoked organized parental backlash via internet lobbies, which he criticized for their "persecutory and vengeful passion" against psychoanalysis.

====== Cognitivists and psychoanalysis as "pseudoscience" ======
Cognitive researchers view psychoanalysis as a pseudoscience, ineffective for interventions in autism. Laurent Mottron (University of Montreal) credits 1950s psychoanalytic approaches for recognizing autistic intelligence but blames the psychoanalytically inspired CFTMEA for misunderstanding autism in France. He criticizes psychoanalysis for forcing observations into a rigid theoretical framework, unlike scientific methods that evolve through consensus. Mottron also considers ABA as dogmatic and harmful as psychoanalysis. Jean-Paul Krivine, editor of Science et pseudo-sciences, counters Bernard Golse's claim that "nothing is validated in autism," arguing that psychoanalysts often claim their practices are unevaluable yet assert therapeutic success. Mathematician and psychologist Nicolas Gauvrit criticizes psychoanalysts for evading questions of efficacy by shifting discourse to emotional or ethical realms, perpetuating a caricature of human-focused psychoanalysts versus chemical-focused cognitivists. Jacques Van Rillaer denounces Lacanian claims of autism as a "psychosis" and their opposition to cognitive behavioral therapy without empirical validation.

=== Autism and anti-psychoanalysis (perspectives of psychiatrists and psychoanalysts) ===
Neuropsychiatrist and psychoanalyst Paul Alerini (2011) views autism as a signifier in the history of child psychiatry, derived from Eugen Bleuler’s truncation of "autoeroticism." He argues that autism, initially created within psychoanalysis to contrast with infantile psychoses, now opposes it through powerful academic, medical, scientific, and political forces, making autism a "symptom of this reversal."

==== 1960s: Emergence of an "anti-psychoanalytic" movement in the United States ====
According to Jacques Hochmann, a Lyon-based psychiatrist and psychoanalyst, an "anti-psychoanalytic" movement emerged in the United States in the early 1960s. This was a reaction to exaggerated hopes of transforming human behavior through less repressive education and the excessive blaming of pathogenic parental attitudes by some psychoanalysts. Despite Edmund Bergler’s posthumous 1964 book, the focus on maternal or familial unconscious causes for mental disorders, including autism, remained dominant. The Autism Society of America, founded in 1965 by psychologist Bernard Rimland, a father of an autistic child, declared families as victims of psychoanalytic "racism." Publications proliferated, notably in the Journal of Autism and Childhood Schizophrenia, founded by Leo Kanner, which became the Journal of Autism and Developmental Disorders in 1979 after excluding psychoanalysts from its editorial board. Alerini describes autism as the "standard" of a movement uniting cognitivists, behaviorists, neuroscientists, and parents, some of whom are researchers or professionals, explicitly opposing psychoanalysis and framing autism as a disability of unproven origin. This anti-psychoanalytic stance has become "threatening and persecutory," fueled by conflicts over childhood autism. Maud Mannoni (1967) saw autism as a commodity with "phallic surplus value," a Michel Foucault and Giorgio Agamben-style "dispositif" profiting from the suffering of autistic children and their parents. The Comité consultatif national d’éthique noted France's lag in abandoning psychoanalytic theories, unlike other developed countries in the 1980s. Perrin and Druel-Salmane argue that educational approaches like TEACCH are mobilized by anti-psychoanalytic coalitions to "liberate autistics from psychoanalysis," which is deemed archaic from a scientistic perspective. They note that a 1978 work by Rutter and Schopler shifted autism's etiology from environmental to organic causes, though without conclusive evidence. Such organicist views, they argue, deny the autistic individual's voice. According to Jacques Hochmann, cited by Vincent Flavigny, the "great reversal" in autism's history occurred when psychoanalytic and psychopathological approaches, dominant for 30 years, gave way to an organicist perspective and a shift from mental illness to mental disability.

==== "Battle for Autism" in France ====
===== "Hatred of psychoanalysis" in France: on the film Le Mur (2011) =====
Psychoanalyst and psychiatrist Anna Konrad describes a pervasive "hatred of psychoanalysis" in France, expressed through publications, appeals, blogs, and collectives, amplified by mainstream media. The documentary Le Mur by Sophie Robert, featuring interviews with psychoanalysts, is described as an "audiovisual attack" using satire and deliberate distortion. Its initial ban and subsequent authorization by the Court of Appeal fueled the anti-psychoanalytic campaign. Bernard Golse, featured in the film, called it "utterly despicable and dishonest." Psychiatrist Loriane Brunessaux labeled it a "propaganda film" lacking rigor and honesty.

===== Cultural resistance to psychoanalysis =====
Jacques Hochmann argues that the "anti-psychoanalytic violence" of some parents, expressed on Internet forums and in media, can be explained historically and psychologically. He credits early psychoanalysts with attempting to rescue autistic children from segregation and eugenics but acknowledges that "triumphalism, technical errors, and unproven psychogeneticism" caused misunderstandings with parent associations. These were exacerbated by inevitable resistances to psychoanalysis and fears of "child theft," leading to attacks on French child psychiatry. Hochmann criticizes the "sectarian communitarianism" of parent groups advocating behaviorism and their effective lobbying of the Haute Autorité de santé, resulting in the disavowal of psychotherapeutic practices developed in France over half a century. He argues that psychoanalysis is inherently "non-consensual," invoking Sigmund Freud’s notion of a narcissistic injury to humanity. Hochmann claims that few parents criticizing psychoanalysis online have had sustained contact with an "authentic psychoanalyst" providing regular sessions. He suggests their criticisms stem from "fantasmatic dangers," hearsay, or misconceptions about psychoanalysis as a dismissive, guilt-inducing theory they have not studied.

== See also ==
- Autism
- Psychoanalysis
- Neurodiversity
- Autistic rights movement
- Refrigerator mother theory
- Leo Kanner
- Bruno Bettelheim
- Frances Tustin
- Applied behavior analysis
- Diagnostic and Statistical Manual of Mental Disorders
- Autism in France
