= Mottron =

Mottron is a surname. Notable people with the surname include:

- Laurent Mottron (born 1952), Canadian psychiatrist
- Pierre Mottron (born 1987), French singer and songwriter

== See also ==
- Mothron
