= Arnold Tustin =

British engineer

- Born: Arnold Tustin; 16 July 1899; Newcastle upon Tyne, England
- Died: 29 January 1994 (aged 95)
- Education: Armstrong College (Newcastle University) MSc (1916)
- Spouse: Frances Tustin
- Scientific career
- Fields: control engineering
- Workplaces: University of Birmingham; Imperial College London

Arnold Tustin (16 July 1899 – 9 January 1994) was a British engineer and Professor of Engineering at the University of Birmingham and at Imperial College London who made important contributions to the development of control engineering and its application to electrical machines.

== Biography ==
Tustin started working in 1914 at the age of 16 as an apprentice to the C. A. Parsons and Company, of Newcastle upon Tyne. He entered Armstrong College, later part of Newcastle University, in 1916, served in the Royal Engineers in World War I, and eventually received his master's degree in science in 1922.

In 1922 he joined Metropolitan-Vickers (Metro-Vick) as a graduate trainee. In the early 1930s he worked for Metro-Vick in Russia for two years, advising and selling equipment to the government companies. Here, he wrote his first book on the design of electric motors, which was also translated into Russian. In the late 1930s and during World War II Tustin was working on the Metadyne constant-current DC generator for gun control. He also developed new methods for gyroscopic stabilisation and further applied servo-mechanisms to tanks and naval guns.

After the war, in 1947, he was appointed Professor of Engineering and head of the Department of Electrical Engineering at the University of Birmingham, a post in which he remained until 1955. In 1953-54 he had been Visiting Professor at Massachusetts Institute of Technology, and from 1955 to 1964 he was Professor of Engineering at Imperial College London. Tustin was married to Frances Tustin, a pioneering psychotherapist and authority on autism.

Tustin's primary concern has been in the field of electrical machines, but his interests extended into the fields of systems thinking, control systems, and even economics and biology.

== Publications ==
Tustin was the author of several books and many published papers on electrical machines, a selection.

- 1952. Automatic and manual control: Papers contributed to the Conferences at Cranfield, 1951, Volume 1951, Deel 1 Academic Press
- 1952. Direct current machines for control systems
- 1953, The Mechanism of Economic Systems, Cambridge, MA. : Harvard Univ. Press., (2e ed. 1957)
- 1956. The Next Ten Years of Electrical Engineering
- 1957. Automatic Control. With Ernest Nagel

About Tustin

- 1992, "Pioneers of Control: an interview with Arnold Tustin", Chris Bissell in: IEE Review, June 1992, pp. 223–226
- 1994, "Arnold Tustin 1899-1994", Chris Bissell in: Int. J. Control, Vol 60, No 5, Nov 1994, pp. 649 – 652
