= TASH (organization) =

International disability advocacy association

- The TASH logo, which consists of a stylized Möbius strip
- Formation: 1975; 51 years ago
- Founder: Lou Brown, Norris Haring, Wayne Sailor
- Headquarters: Washington, D.C., United States
- Executive Director: Ruthie-Marie Beckwith
- Website: www.tash.org

TASH is an international advocacy association of people with disabilities, their family members, other advocates, and people who work in the disability field. The mission of TASH is to promote the full inclusion and participation of children and adults with significant disabilities in every aspect of their community, and to eliminate social injustices that diminish human rights. TASH operates as a 501(c)(3) non-profit organization. It has over 30 chapters, a committee structure (e.g., community living, and housing subcommittee) and members in 34 countries and territories and is headquartered at 2013 H Street NW, Suite 715, Washington, D.C. 20006.

== History ==
TASH Executive Directors
- Years: Executive Director
1975–1993	Liz Lindley
1994	Frank Laski
1995–2005	Nancy Weiss
2006–2016	Barb Trader
2016–present	Ruthie-Marie Beckwith

TASH was founded in 1975 under the name "American Association for the Education of the Severely / Profoundly Handicapped" ("AAESPH"). The name was changed to "The Association for the Severely Handicapped" (TASH) in 1980, and again to the name The Association for Persons with Severe Handicaps in 1983. In 1995, the board of directors decided to drop that name as well, since it did not fit with current values. The name TASH is still used due to its high name recognition.

== Activities ==
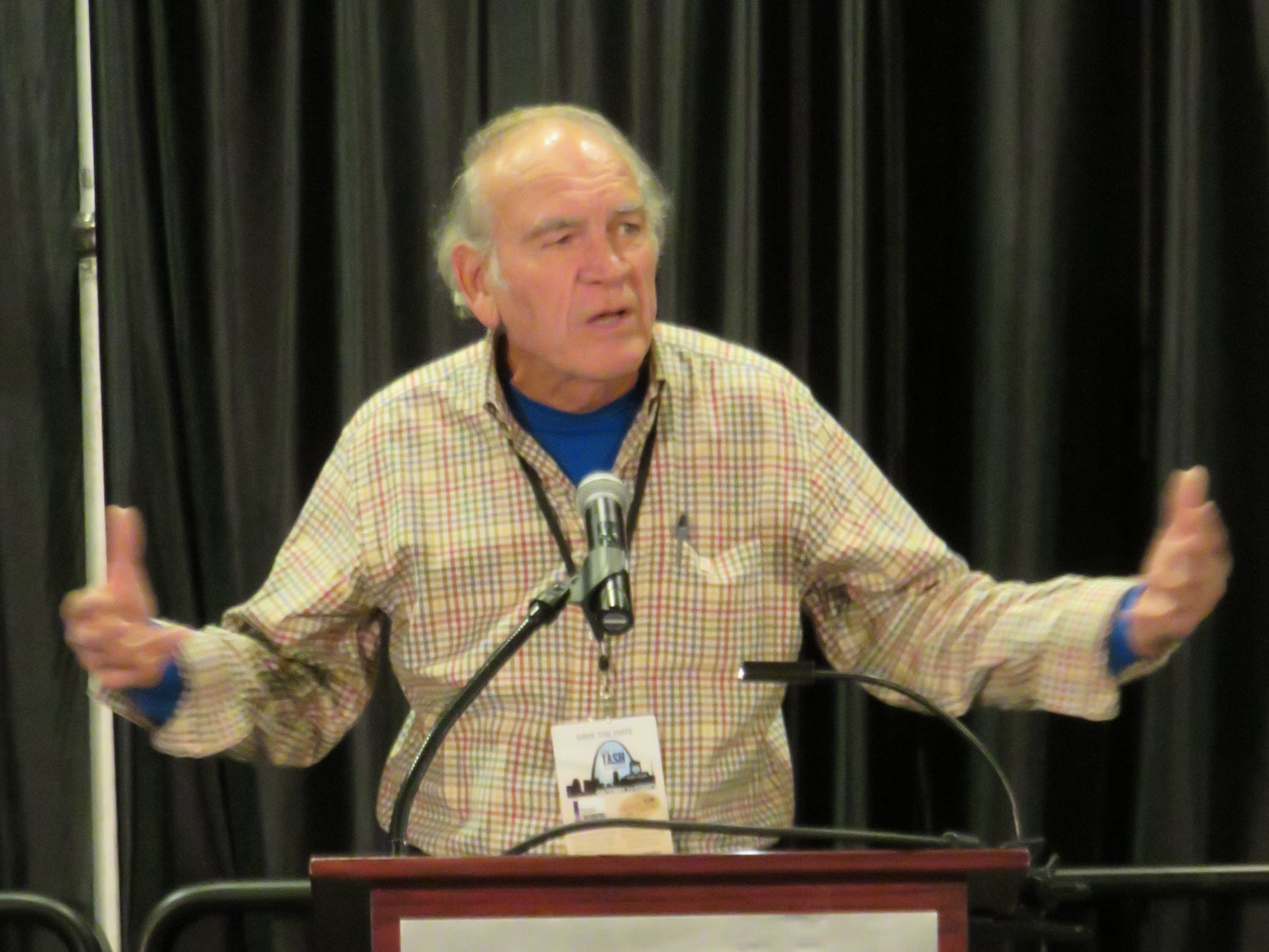
TASH co-founder Wayne Sailor addresses the TASH Annual Conference on its 40th Anniversary, Portland, Oregon, 3 December 2015

TASH publishes a quarterly scholarly journal, Research and Practice for Persons with Severe Disabilities, and a popular magazine, Connections.

== See also ==
- Autism rights movement
- Self-advocacy
