= Research and Practice for Persons with Severe Disabilities =

- Discipline: Special education
- Language: English
- Edited by: Martin Agran

Publication details
- Former names: Journal of the Association for Persons with Severe Handicaps, Journal of the Association for the Severely Handicapped, AAESPH Review
- History: 1976-present
- Publisher: SAGE Publications on behalf of TASH
- Frequency: Quarterly
- Impact factor: 1.778 (2017)

Standard abbreviations
- ISO 4: Res. Pract. Pers. Sev. Disabil.

Indexing
- ISSN: 1540-7969 (print); 2169-2408 (web)
- LCCN: 2002211204
- OCLC no.: 60627234

Links
- Journal homepage; Online access; Online archive; Journal page at association's website

Research and Practice for Persons with Severe Disabilities is a quarterly peer-reviewed academic journal that covers the fields of education and special education. It is published by SAGE Publications on behalf of TASH and the editor-in-chief is Craig Kennedy (University of Connecticut). The journal was established in 1976 as the AAESPH Review. It was renamed in 1980 to Journal of the Association for the Severely Handicapped and in 1983 to Journal of the Association for Persons with Severe Handicaps, before obtaining its current name in 2001.

== Abstracting and indexing ==
The journal is abstracted and indexed in Scopus and the Social Sciences Citation Index. According to the Journal Citation Reports, its 2017 impact factor is 1.778, ranking it 10th out of 40 journals in the category "Education, Special" and 22nd out of 69 journals in the category "Rehabilitation".
