= Autistic rights movement =

Disability rights movement

The rainbow-colored infinity symbol is a popular symbol among autistic rights advocates. The symbol represents the infinite potential and diversity of the autistic community, reflecting the unique strengths and qualities of each autistic individual.

The autistic rights movement, also known as the autism rights movement or the autism acceptance movement, is a social movement allied with the disability rights movement. It emphasizes the neurodiversity paradigm, viewing autism as a set of naturally occurring variations in human cognition, a cognitive difference with both strengths and weaknesses, rather than as a disease to be cured or a medical disorder. This paradigm contradicts and diverges from the medical model of disability, without opposing all aspects of it.

There are several core values that are essential in the autism rights movement. The phrase "Nothing about us without us", shared with other disability movements, has become a motto that encompasses these beliefs. The autistic rights movement and its relationship to the younger neurodiversity community have become much stronger over the years. The idea that people who are on the spectrum are allowed to advocate for themselves is now widely accepted.

This idea is generally accepted until there becomes an overlap with the effects of future research. Another core value of the autism rights movement is the right for further research that expands on previous sciences and even debunks possible false information. For the autistic movement this may become a break away if advocacy begins to promote the idea of sameness. Many sectors within the autism rights movement still consider continued search on treatments and the possible eradication of autism. This leaves a division amongst the autism rights movement community.

The autistic rights movement advocates for widespread acceptance of autistic people, as well as the traits and behaviors (e.g., stimming, lack of eye contact, and special interests) associated with autism. New research on stimming behaviors have suggested that not only should it be accepted, it should be encouraged. The movement also actively advocates for autistic people to socialize on their own terms, and to mitigate the double empathy problem.

The movement places a large emphasis on goals that align with the neurodivergence movement, such as the idea that autism should not be labeled as a defect but rather be viewed as a form of bio-variance that should be accepted and embraced. Autistic rights activist push to reform, advance, and foster autism-oriented support services, interventions or therapies in accordance with neurodiversity principles to emphasize coping skills for challenging situations. The neurodivergence framework aims to emphasize the importance of these reforms following the concept that all unique personalities should be acceptable. The movement also shadow cases the importance of interventions that create supportive environments that facilitate the strengths and weaknesses of the individual.

The movement criticizes therapies and interventions that—implicitly or explicitly, unintentionally or intentionally—encourage masking behaviors associated with autism and imitating neurotypical social behaviors. According to research, masking behaviors may be linked to long term negative effects such as anxiety, depression and exhaustion within individuals with autism. Further evidence supports the idea that some therapies and interventions might also reinforce masking, as a substantial proportion of autistic adults who experienced some forms of applied behavior analysis based interventions reported adverse effects such as detrimental effects on their mental health due to increased or excessive camouflaging or masking.

== History ==
=== 1980s–1990s: Early autistic-run organizations, newsletters, and conferences ===
Jim Sinclair is credited as the first person to communicate the autistic rights perspective. In the early 1990s, Sinclair frequently participated in autism conferences led by parent-centric organizations but found them "overwhelmingly hostile from both sensory and emotional standpoints". In 1992, Sinclair co-founded the Autism Network International (ANI) with Donna Williams and Kathy Grant, an organization that publishes newsletters "written by and for autistic people".

The ANI newsletter, Our Voice, had its first issue distributed online in November 1992 to an audience of primarily neurotypical professionals and parents of young autistic children. The number of autistic people in the organization increased over the years, and ANI eventually became a communication network for like-minded autistic people. Sinclair wrote the essay "Don't Mourn for Us" (1993) in the ANI newsletter (Volume 1, Number 3) with an anti-cure perspective on autism. New York Times journalist Amy Harmon considers the essay a touchstone for the autistic rights movement, and it has been mentioned in the New York Magazine.

ANI established the yearly retreat "Autreat" in 1996. Autreat was a retreat and conference held in the United States specifically for autistic people and was held every year from 1996 to 2013, except in 2001. The theme of the first conference in 1996 was "Celebrating Autistic Culture", and it had close to 60 participants. It was hosted at Camp Bristol Hills in Canandaigua, New York. Participants compared their movement to gay rights activists, or the Deaf culture, where sign language is preferred over surgery that might restore hearing. The success of Autreat later inspired similar retreats, such as the Association for Autistic Community's conference, Autspace, in the United States; Autscape in the United Kingdom; and Projekt Empowerment in Sweden.

The emergence of the Internet as well as social media has played a large role in the history of self-advocacy. In 1993 Mosaic was developed, an Internet browser that would open the World Wide Web and make it accessible to almost anyone. This Internet browser did not require Internet addresses or the traditional keyboard commands. The incorporation of new databases and technological advancement allowed for the expansion of autistic presence on the web. This transition has led to the increase and the ease of self-advocacy for autistic individuals.

Martijn Dekker, an autistic computer programmer from the Netherlands, launched an e-mail list called "Independent Living on the Autism Spectrum", or "InLv", in 1996. The list also welcomed those with similar forms of neurodivergence, such as ADHD, dyslexia, and dyscalculia. American writer Harvey Blume was a member of the list and described it as embracing "neurological pluralism" in a 1997 article in The New York Times. Blume discussed the concept of neurological diversity with Australian sociologist Judy Singer. The term "neurodiversity" was first published in Harvey Blume's 1998 article in The Atlantic and again, in Judy Singer's 1998 Honours thesis.

=== 2000s–2010s: The rise of self-advocacy ===
Aspies For Freedom (AFF) was founded in 2004. They established June 18 as Autistic Pride Day starting in 2005. AFF member Joe Mele initiated a protest against the National Alliance for Autism Research in 2004.

In 2004, Canadian autism researcher Michelle Dawson challenged applied behavior analysis (ABA), a common behavioral intervention for autistic people, on ethical grounds. She testified in Auton v. British Columbia against the lack of required government funding for ABA. That same year, The New York Times covered the autistic rights perspective by publishing journalist Amy Harmon's article, "How About Not Curing Us, Some Autistics Are Pleading".

In 2006, The Autism Acceptance Project (TAAP) was founded by Estée Klar, the mother of an autistic child, with help from an autistic advisory and board. The project is affiliated with the Autistic Self Advocacy Network (ASAN) and other activist groups in North America. The project was dedicated to promoting acceptance and accommodations for autistic people in society and was primarily supported by autistic people. The website for TAAP disappeared a decade later, but the idea of promoting acceptance has now been adopted with other campaigns such as Autism Acceptance Month.

From 2005 to 2007, TAAP organized arts-based events. TAAP also sponsored the Joy of Autism: Redefining Ability and Quality of Life events and lectures in Toronto, featuring dozens of autistic artists and speakers such as Jim Sinclair, Michelle Dawson, Phil Schwartz, Morton Ann Gernsbacher, and Larry Bissonnette.

In 2007, an ASAN initiative helped halt the New York Child Study Campaign. The advertising campaign launched in 2007 depicted conditions like autism and ADHD as kidnappers holding children for ransom. The campaign was canceled two weeks after its launch when the center's director had received an estimated 3000 e-mails and phone calls, most of them "expressing anger and hurt". ASAN halted another advertising campaign in 2008 where PETA had implied a link between autism and casein in milk. Phone calls, letters, and petitions organized by ASAN contributed to the removal of the advertisements.

=== 2020–present ===
The COVID-19 pandemic caused a drop-off in physical events in the summer of 2020, including autism pride events. Much of autism awareness and campaigning was driven by social media, including the notable growth of TikTok and the emergence of autistic advocates like Chloé Hayden and Paige Layle.

Autism advocacy made progress within the traditional media, making its way into influential business publications such as Harvard Business Review and Fast Company. A comprehensive approach to inclusion in the workplace, the Canary Code, was developed in 2022 by Ludmila Praslova, specifically focusing on autistic talent and other marginalized communities.

=== Neurodiversity and autistic self-advocacy movement ===
Judy Singer describes neurodiversity as a middle ground between the two dominating models of disability, the medical model and strong versions of the social model, dismissing both of them as insufficiently capturing the solution for—and cause of—disability.

Steve Silberman describes neurodiversity as seeing the virtue of different forms of neurodivergence while taking into consideration that they also convey challenges. Autistics for Autistics, a self-advocacy group, describes neurodiversity this way: "Neurodiversity means that—like biodiversity—all of us have a role to play in society ...and we should be valued for who we are. Included in public life, such as school and employment. For nonspeaking autistics, this also means equal and fair access to communication, such as AAC."

The autistic self-advocacy movement, made up of autistic individuals, works from a social model of disability perspective. For example, the Autistic Self-Advocacy Network describes its mandate as "to advance the principles of the disability rights movement with regard to autism".

Autistic people are considered to have neurocognitive differences that give them distinct strengths and weaknesses, and they are capable of succeeding when appropriately accommodated and supported. According to Ludmila Praslova, author of The Canary Code, creating systems that support the employment of autistic people and their success through organizational transparency, justice, and flexibility benefits all employees.

There is no leader of the neurodiversity movement, and little academic research has been conducted on it as a social phenomenon. As such, proponents of the neurodiversity approach have heterogeneous beliefs but are consistent in the view that autism cannot be separated from an autistic person. The movement opposes therapies that aim to make children "indistinguishable from their peers". Instead, they advocate for accommodations in schools and work environments and including autistic people when making decisions that affect them. Neurodiversity advocates oppose researching a "cure" for autism, and instead support research that helps autistic people thrive as they are.

An analysis of data from the UK and Hungary in 2017 found evidence that autistic or intellectually disabled self-advocates are rarely involved in leadership or decision-making within organisations. It also showed that poverty, unpaid positions at disability organisations, and lack of support are significant barriers for most autistic people, including autistic people with an intellectual disability who wish to self-advocate.

== Perspectives ==
=== Autism diagnosis ===
The Autistic Self-Advocacy Network (ASAN) uses a seven-colored heptagonal symbol to represent both the autistic spectrum and the idea of diversity.

The autistic rights movement rejects the classification by psychiatrists of autism as a disorder. Autistic self-advocates also reject terming the reported increase in autism diagnoses as an "epidemic" since the word implies autism is a disease and point out that the increase is likely due to an expansion of diagnostic criteria rather than an epidemic.

=== Rejection of functioning labels ===
The autistic rights movement rejects the use of the labels "high-functioning" and "low-functioning" when describing different autistic people, arguing that the strengths and struggles of autistic people are on a spectrum and not linear.

=== Opposition to cure and prevention ===
The autistic rights movement opposes "curing" autism, criticizing the idea as misguided and dangerous. Instead, autism is viewed as a way of life and advocate acceptance over a search for a cure. The autistic rights movement is a part of the larger disability rights movement and acknowledges the social model of disability. Within the model, struggles faced by autistic people are viewed as discrimination rather than deficiencies. Advocates of this perspective believe that autism is a unique way of being that should be valued, and efforts to eliminate autism should not be compared to curing cancer but instead to the "efforts of a previous age to cure left-handedness". Most members of the autistic community agree that autistic people should not be made to act exactly like everyone else but that society should accommodate their disability and that autism services should focus on quality of life rather than conformity.

Autistic rights activists are opposed to attempts to eliminate autism genes, and argue that doing so would decrease human genetic diversity. In particular, there is opposition to prenatal genetic testing of autism in fetuses, which some believe might be possible in the future. On 23 February 2005, Joseph Buxbaum of the Autism Genome Project at the Icahn School of Medicine at Mount Sinai said there could be a prenatal test for autism within 10 years. However, the genetics of autism have proven to be extremely complex. A wider debate on the ethics involved in the possible elimination of a genotype that has advantages as well as disadvantages, has focused on possible negative effects of tampering with natural selection.

Some people lament that professionals, such as social workers, may discourage autistic people from having children. Activists are concerned that the "ultimate cure will be a genetic test to prevent autistic children from being born" and that most fetuses with so-called "autism genes" would be aborted if prenatal tests for autism are developed.

Activist Jim Sinclair expresses in his essay "Don't Mourn For Us" that wishing that an autistic person be cured is equivalent to wishing that an entirely different person exists in their place.

Canadian autism researcher Michelle Dawson writes that "No one has yet calculated the costs to autistics, and to society, of the current widespread autism advocacy effort to create a world where there are no autistic people at all."

==== Opposing views within the autistic community ====
Autistic ethologist Temple Grandin has stated that, if autistic genes were completely eliminated, society would lose scientists, musicians, and mathematicians; she posited a caveman "with high-functioning Asperger's" might have developed the stone spear. However, she has also labeled the lives of autistic people with highly intensive support needs "miserable" and said, "It would be nice if you could prevent the most severe forms of nonverbal autism." In a March 2022 update to the frequently-asked-questions section of her official website, Grandin denied it was eugenic to advocate for a reduction in autistic "severity".

=== Autistic culture ===
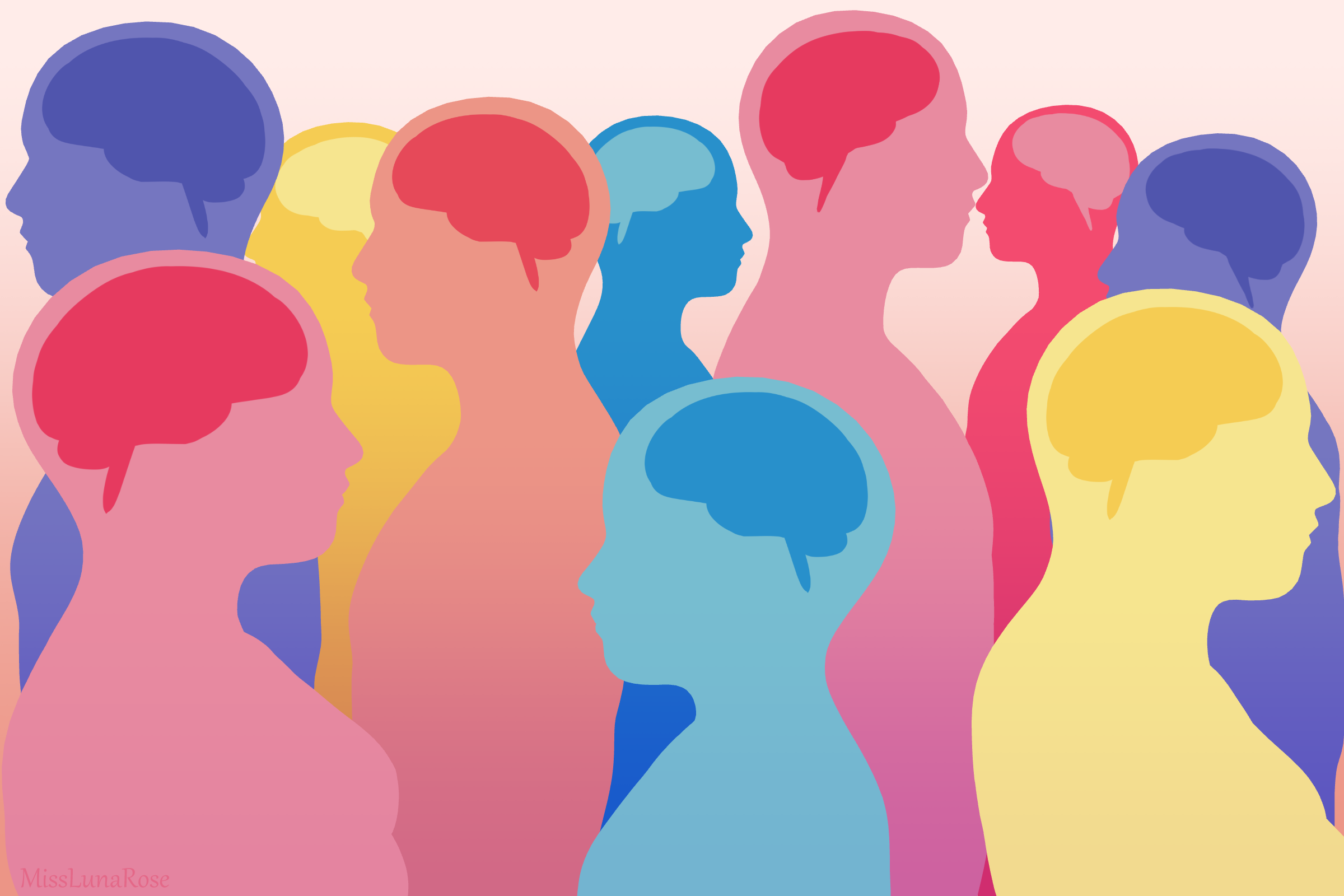
Autistic art representing the natural diversity of human minds

Some autistic activists suggest that life as an autistic person is like being born among people who speak a different language, follow a religion or philosophy one does not share, and live a lifestyle that feels alien. Social media, meetups, and specific professions are spaces where autistic people connect and may share common interests.

=== Self advocacy and inclusion in decision-making ===
A common theme expressed among autistic rights activists and neurodiversity groups is that they are different from parent- and professional-led organizations and conferences that dominate the autism scene.

In 2003, autism researcher Michelle Dawson criticizes the norm of allowing parents to speak on behalf of their autistic children at conferences to the exclusion of autistics: "With the happy and proud collaboration of governments, courts, researchers, service providers, and funding bodies", she says, "parents have succeeded in removing autistics from the vicinity of any important discussions or decisions." She says that the exclusion results in policy and treatment decisions being made solely by individuals who are not autistic.

=== Autism interventions and therapies ===
In 2011, Aspies For Freedom (AFF) stated that they believe many unethical therapies and treatments for autism have become common. AFF argued that extensive—40 hours per week—applied behavior analysis (ABA) and restricting stimming and other coping mechanisms associated with autism are mentally harmful, that aversion therapy and the use of restraints are physically harmful, and that non-medically approved treatments like chelation therapy and exorcism are dangerous.

United Nations (UN) human rights experts have expressed that autistic people are particularly at risk for harmful medical practices and some approaches amount to "ill-treatment or torture".

Canadian autism self-advocate Michelle Dawson testified in court against government funding of ABA therapy. The Canadian organization Autistics for Autistics (A4A) has outlined some of the main objections to ABA from autistic self-advocates.

In 2004, Jane Meyerding, who is autistic, criticized therapy that attempts to remove autism typical behaviors and states that the behaviors are often attempts to communicate. Studies have shown that efforts to pass as non-autistic is associated with poorer mental health and psychological well-being, and such findings were consistent across various age groups. There have been accounts and qualitative evidence that some forms of behavioral interventions increase masking or worsen mental health for some autistic people. American autistic rights advocate Ari Ne'eman argues that by addressing individual traits of autism, it is possible to reduce harmful behavior and avoid encouraging camouflaging behaviors.

== Criticism of Autism Speaks ==
Autism Speaks has faced criticism from autistic rights advocates for failing to represent autistic people and for exploitative practices. Autistic rights activists organize protests against organizations they consider objectionable, most notably Autism Speaks and the Judge Rotenberg Center. In the United States, activists affiliated with ASAN have organized numerous protests against Autism Speaks events, typically protesting and leafleting at fundraising walks. Autistic activists including Shain Neumeier and Ly Xīnzhèn M. Zhǎngsūn Brown have organized lobbying days and protests aiming to close or more strictly regulate the Judge Rotenberg Center.

Until he resigned in 2013, John Elder Robison was Autism Speaks' only board member openly recognized as being autistic. His resignation came two days after the release of an op-ed by the group's co-founder Suzanne Wright which, according to Robison, "is simply not defensible for someone who feels as I do, and I cannot continue to stand up for the public actions of an organization that makes the same mistakes over and over again by failing to connect to the community it purports to represent".

Simone Greggs, the mother of an autistic child, filed a lawsuit against Autism Speaks for disability discrimination after her job offer was rescinded. The suit alleges that she lost the job offer due to asking for an accommodation on behalf of her autistic son.

Autism Speaks has produced the documentary films Autism Every Day (2006) and Sounding the Alarm (2014) and the short video I Am Autism (2009), each met with strong opposition from autistic rights advocates. Autism Every Day is a documentary featuring interviews of parents with mostly negative opinions about autism and their situations. Disability rights advocates criticized it due to parents speaking about their children as if they are not there. In one interview, former board member Alison Singer, while in the same room as her autistic daughter, reveals she had contemplated driving herself and her daughter off a bridge. I Am Autism is a short video that personifies autism as a narrative voice, which compares itself to several life-threatening diseases and makes the false claim of causing divorce. Sounding the Alarm is a documentary exploring the transition to adulthood and the cost of lifetime care. It was criticized by the Autistic Women & Nonbinary Network for being "full of dehumanizing rhetoric" and portraying ignorance of communication other than speech.

Autism Speaks fundraising events have been the object of several organized protests by autistic rights advocates.

In 2013, the organization Boycott Autism Speaks published a list of companies that donate money to Autism Speaks along with their contact information, urging those in the autistic community to pressure those companies into dropping their support via an active boycott, since direct appeals to Autism Speaks did not result in the desired changes. A month later, ASAN published its 2014 Joint Letter to the Sponsors of Autism Speaks, signed by 26 different disability-related organizations, appealing to the moral responsibility of the sponsors, donors, and other supporters.

== Autistic rights groups ==
There are several organizations in the autistic rights movement. Some like ASAN are led exclusively by autistic people, while others such as Autism National Committee encourage cooperation between autistic people and their non-autistic allies.

Year founded	Title	Description	Nonprofit status
1983	Autism-Europe	An international network association located in Brussels, Belgium, whose main objective is to advance the rights of autistic people and their families and to help them improve their quality of life. Autism-Europe does this primarily by representing autistic people and their families in advocacy work with the European Union institutions.	International non-profit organisation (aisbl)
1992	Autism Network International	An international autistic-led advocacy group founded by Jim Sinclair, Donna Williams, and Kathy Grant aimed at combatting the medicalization and curative model of autism and supporting autistic community. ANI founded Autreat.	
1996	Association for Autism and Neurodiversity	US non-profit founded by autistic adults, family members, and medical professionals focusing on policy reform, education, and community support.	Yes
2004	Aspies For Freedom (AFF)	UK campaign and online community founded by Amy and Gwen Nelson. AFF organizes Autistic Pride Day.	None
2005	Suomen Autismikirjon Yhdistys	Finnish autistic-led national organization focusing on social inclusion, autistic pride, and independent living.	
2006	Autistic Self-Advocacy Network (ASAN)	US autistic-led non-profit advocacy organization focusing on advocating for the inclusion of autistic people in all areas of society, including policy, media representation, and disability services.	Yes
2008	Washington Autism Alliance	Washington state organization formed by Arzu Forough in 2008 to advocate for WA state individual access balanced with systems change advocacy and policy reform.	Yes
2009	Don't Play Me, Pay Me	UK campaign focusing on Asperger syndrome, encouraging and supporting disabled actors.	None
2011	Autistic Women & Nonbinary Network (AWN)	US autistic-led non-profit advocacy organization focused on empowering and supporting autistic women, trans people, non-binary people. AWN coordinates with Autistic People of Color Fund, Ramp Your Voice!, and more intersectional disability and autism rights groups.	Yes
2014	AsIAm	Irish autistic-led charity founded by Adam Harris focused on education and employment advocacy, government campaigning, and in-person and online direct support.	Yes
2016	Alternative Baseball Organization	Adaptive baseball/softball organization formed by Taylor C. Duncan in 2016 to raise awareness and acceptance for autistic teens and adults through sport.	Yes
2017	Autistics 4 Autistics	Canadian autistic-led organization focusing on communication choice, policy reform, educational inequality, mentorship, health access, and fighting seclusion practices in school.	Yes
2019	European Council of Autistic People	An international network association of autistic-led European organizations located in Prague, Czechia, whose main objective is autism advocacy, policy reform, and member co-operation and coordination. EUCAP is a member of the European Disability Forum and the European Network on Independent Living.	International non-profit organisation
2019	Reframing Autism	Australian autistic-led organization focused on reducing stigma, combatting ableism and pathologization, lifting autistic voices, and autistic inclusion.	
2020	Thriving Autistic	An international neurodivergent-led network based in Ireland founded by Tara O’Donnell-Killen focused on providing affirming therapies, services and education for adults, professional training, and neurodiversity advocacy. ASAN affiliate.	None
2021	Autistas de México	Mexican autistic-led organization focusing on autistic pride, combatting ableism and pathologization, and promoting autistic-led or collaborative research about autism. ASAN affiliate.	Yes

== Terminology ==
There is disagreement within the autism community on whether to use person-first terminology (e.g., person with autism) or identity-first terminology (e.g., autistic person). The autistic rights movement encourages the use of identity-first terminology to stress that autism is a part of an individual's identity rather than a condition they have.

Phrases like suffers from autism or "autist" are objectionable to many people, and are discouraged by both the American Psychological Association's style guide and National Center on Disability and Journalism's style guide.

The autistic community has developed their own terminology such as:

- Aspie – a person with Asperger syndrome, a defunct subtype of autism that was rolled into autism spectrum disorder in the fifth edition of the Diagnostic and Statistical Manual of Mental Disorders and the 11th revision of the International Classification of Diseases. According to polls taken by autistic activist Chris Bonnello (primarily of autistic people within the United States and the United Kingdom), self-use of the Asperger label declined from approximately 51 percent to 19 percent between 2018 and 2022. This drop followed the 2018 publication of Asperger's Children, a book by Edith Sheffer that revealed namesake Hans Asperger was complicit in the Nazis' murder of autistic children. Critics have also rejected the Asperger label for unnecessarily dividing the autistic community and reinforcing the outmoded view of the autistic spectrum as a functioning hierarchy.
- Autie – an autistic person.
- Autistics and cousins (AC) – a cover term including autistic people and their "cousins", i.e., people with some autistic traits but no official diagnosis.
- Curebie – a person with the desire to cure autism. This term is considered derogatory.
- Neurodiversity – the framework for understanding some disabilities, such as autism, as a variation in human neurological makeup rather than a disorder.
- Neurotypical (NT) – a person who does not have any neurological differences.
- Allistic – a person who is not autistic. Originally it was used satirically.

== Autistic culture and community ==
John Elder Robison talks about Be Different on Bookbits radio.

Because many autistic individuals find it easier to communicate online than in person, a large number of online resources are available. Some autistic individuals learn sign language, participate in online chat rooms, discussion boards, and websites, or use communication devices at autism-community social events. The Internet helps bypass non-verbal cues and emotional sharing that autistic individuals tend to have difficulty with. It gives autistic individuals a way to communicate and form online communities. Conducting work, conversation and interviews online in chat rooms, rather than via phone calls or personal contact, helps level the playing field for many autistic individuals. A 1997 New York Times article said "the impact of the Internet on autistics may one day be compared in magnitude to the spread of sign language among the deaf" because it opens new opportunities for communication by filtering out "sensory overload that impedes communication among autistics".

== Notable events ==
Event	When	Occurrence			
Event	When	Occurrence	Disability Day of Mourning	1 March	Yearly
Autistic Pride Day	18 June	Yearly			
Autistics Speaking Day	1 November	Yearly			

Autism activist activities do not always look like other forms of political activism. For example, many autistic people cannot participate in in-person public protests due to sensory overload from the noise. Other cultural assumptions about the correct way to engage in activism, such as "giving people a voice", are not consistent with valuing non-speaking autistic people.

=== Autistic Pride Day ===
Autistic Pride Day is an annual pride celebration that was established by Aspies For Freedom and is observed on 18 June. Organizers of the celebration have compared their efforts to the civil rights and LGBTQ social movements.

=== Autistics Speaking Day ===
Autistics Speaking Day was established by members of the autistic community and is observed annually on 1 November. It provides an opportunity for autistic people to challenge negative stereotypes by speaking for themselves and sharing their stories. The first Autistics Speaking Day was held in 2010. According to Corina Becker, one of the founders, the day is to "acknowledge our difficulties while sharing our strengths, passions, and interests". The idea for the event developed out of opposition to a Communication Shutdown fundraising campaign led by U.S. charity Autism Speaks. Participants had been asked to "simulate having autism" by straying from all forms of online communication for one day. That event received criticism and accused Autism Speaks of missing the point of what autism actually is, referring to autistic individuals' comfort using other means of communication.

=== Autism Acceptance Day ===
In 2011, the first Autism Acceptance Day celebrations were organized by Paula Durbin Westby as a response to traditional "autism awareness" campaigns many within the autistic community found harmful and insufficient. Autism Acceptance Day is now held every April. Awareness focuses on informing others of the existence of autism, while acceptance pushes towards validating and honoring the autism community. By providing tools and educational material, people are encouraged to embrace the challenges autistic people face and celebrate their strengths. Instead of encouraging people to wear blue, Autism Acceptance Day encourages people to wear red.

=== Disability Day of Mourning ===
In 2012, autistic activist Zoe Gross organized the first Disability Day of Mourning vigil held in memory of people with disabilities murdered by family members or caregivers. These vigils are now held annually on 1 March globally, often by local self-advocacy and disability rights groups.

=== #RedInstead ===
In 2015, autistic activist Alanna Rose Whitney created the social media campaign #WalkInRed, later rebranded #RedInstead to also include wheelchair users, as another alternative to Light It Up Blue.

== Scholarship ==
Autism received increasing attention from social-science scholars in the early 2000s, with the goals of improving support services and therapies, arguing that autism should be tolerated as a difference not a disorder, and by how autism affects the definition of personhood and identity. Sociological research has also investigated how social institutions, particularly families, cope with the challenges associated with autism.

A study published on 20 January 2021, by the University of Texas at Dallas suggests that educating non-autistic people about the strengths and challenges of autistic people can help reduce stigma and misconceptions surrounding autism, which may help increase social inclusion of autistic people. The study also found that implicit biases about autism were harder to overcome for non-autistic people.

== See also ==
- AsIAm – Irish autism charity
- Autism: The Musical
- Look Me in the Eye – Book by John Elder Robinson
- Mad pride – Movement encouraging pride in people with mental illnesses
- Ole Ivar Lovaas – Norwegian-American psychologist (1927–2010)
- Prenatal screening for autism – Medical practice
- Spaces on The Spectrum: How Autism Movements Resist Experts and Create Knowledge – 2024 book by Catherine Tan
- TASH (organization) – International disability advocacy association

== Sources ==
- Kapp, Steven K., ed. (2020). Autistic Community and the Neurodiversity Movement. doi:10.1007/978-981-13-8437-0. ISBN 978-981-13-8436-3.
- Silberman, Steve (2015). Neurotribes: the legacy of autism and the future of neurodiversity. New York: Avery, an imprint of Penguin Random House. ISBN 978-1-58333-467-6.
- Singer, Judy (2017). NeuroDiversity: The Birth of an Idea. Judy Singer. ISBN 978-0-6481547-0-9.
- Waltz, Mitzi (2023) [2013]. Autism: A Social and Medical History (2nd ed.). Cham, Switzerland: Springer. ISBN 978-3-031-31015-7.
