= Paige Layle =

Canadian autism activist (born 2000)

- Born: Paige Hennekam; August 2, 2000 (age 26); Kawartha Lakes, Ontario, Canada
- Occupations: Activist; author
- Years active: 2015–present
- Website: paigelayle.ca

Paige Hennekam (born August 2, 2000), better known as Paige Layle, is a Canadian ADHD and autism acceptance activist and author. They (Note: Layle uses they/them and she/her pronouns. This article uses they/them for consistency.) are known for discussing their experiences with ADHD and autism on Instagram, TikTok, and YouTube since 2020. Their first book, But Everyone Feels This Way: How an Autism Diagnosis Saved My Life, was released in 2024.

== Early life ==
Layle was born Paige Hennekam in Kawartha Lakes, Ontario on August 2, 2000, to Tracy (née Layle) and John Hennekam. They attempted suicide at the age of 15, after which they were diagnosed with autism, OCD, and ADHD.

== Career ==
Layle started making TikTok videos about autism in March 2020, after hearing an audio clip on TikTok that mocked autistic people. They created a four-part video series on autism in girls to address common misconceptions about the disorder. In 2020 and 2021, they joined other members of the autism community in weighing in on the controversy surrounding Sia's film Music.

In 2021, Layle and other autism advocates such as Chloé Hayden criticized Color the Spectrum: A Livestream to Support the Autism Community, a fundraiser launched by Mark Rober in support of NEXT for AUTISM. They critiqued NEXT for funding Autism Speaks, an organization that has received backlash for its attempts to "cure" autism. To counter Color the Spectrum, Layle and other advocates planned to host a fundraising livestream on the same date and time to raise money for the Autistic Self Advocacy Network (ASAN). The livestream was later cancelled due to allegations that ASAN had plagiarized work from Indigenous creator Autistic, Typing.

In 2022, Layle was a performer for the audiobook version of Wendy Walker's American Girl, produced by Audible.

Layle's first book, But Everyone Feels This Way: How an Autism Diagnosis Saved My Life, was released in March 2024.

As of February 2025, Layle has 2.7 million TikTok followers, 173,000 Instagram followers, and 183,000 YouTube subscribers.

== Personal life ==
Layle uses they/them and she/her pronouns, and came out as a lesbian on February 6, 2025, after previously labeling themself as pansexual. As of 2024, they reside in their hometown of Kawartha Lakes and work part-time as a dance teacher.

In a 2025 video, Layle revealed that they had gone no contact with their parents in 2023.
