= Dawn Prince-Hughes =

American anthropologist, primatologist, author

Dawn Prince-Hughes (born 1964) is an American anthropologist, primatologist, and ethologist. She is the author of several books, including Gorillas Among Us: A Primate Ethnographer's Book of Days and her memoir Songs of the Gorilla Nation: My Journey Through Autism, and she is the editor of the essay collection Aquamarine Blue 5: Personal Stories of College Students with Autism.

== Biography ==
Prince-Hughes was raised in Carbondale, Illinois by her mother, who was a homemaker, and her father, who was a heating and air-conditioning serviceman. In her memoir Songs of the Gorilla Nation, Prince-Hughes describes her childhood experience with symptoms of undiagnosed autism, dropping out of high school, and then becoming "technically homeless."

She met the gorillas at the Woodland Park Zoo in Seattle for the first time at age 20, and her detailed study of the behavior of the gorillas was noticed by the zoo research director. She became employed by the zoo, and ultimately spent a total of 12 years studying the gorillas. Prince-Hughes was diagnosed with Asperger syndrome at age 36.

In 1987, she started working on her bachelor's degree. She completed her PhD in interdisciplinary anthropology through a distance education program at a university in Switzerland. She became an adjunct professor at Western Washington University in 2000, the same year she received her Asperger's diagnosis.

== Writing career ==
Prince-Hughes has written a variety of books, including Gorillas Among Us: A Primate Ethnographer's Book of Days, published in 2001, and her memoir Songs of the Gorilla Nation: My Journey Through Autism, published in 2004. She also edited and contributed to the essay collection Aquamarine Blue 5: Personal Stories of College Students with Autism, published in 2002.

=== Gorillas Among Us: A Primate Ethnographer's Book of Days ===
Gorillas Among Us is based on a year of observations by Prince-Hughes of a family of gorillas in a zoo. In a review for the Journal of Anthropological Research, Vicki K. Bentley-Condit writes, "This book is, indeed, an unusual approach to nonhuman primates, and it is somewhat anthropomorphic and nonscientific as well. However, Prince-Hughes did not set out to write a scientific précis of Gorilla gorilla gorilla behavior. She wants to tell a story." In a review for Booklist, Marlene Chamberlain writes, "In reading this book, it is hard not to empathize with a species often referred to as our closest relative. However scientific her observations, Prince-Hughes clearly developed a nonverbal rapport with the gorilla family, and the book has some sadness but much joy."

=== Aquamarine Blue 5: Personal Stories of College Students with Autism ===
In Aquamarine Blue 5, Prince-Hughes collected personal essays by college students with autism about their experiences, wrote a preface introducing each author, her own essay, and a conclusion with recommendations for universities as well as a bibliography with additional information resources. She did not edit the essays written by the students. According to a review by Nancy McCray in Booklist, "Sharing their trials and tribulations, these adults offer their communities a certain expertise, especially in libraries and universities, where people with such conditions are often successful." Eartha Melzer writes for Foreword Reviews, "Their challenges are diverse; their stories are engaging; and in many cases their writing is excellent."

=== Songs of the Gorilla Nation: My Journey Through Autism ===
The personal essay written by Prince-Hughes for Aquamarine Blue 5 became the basis for her memoir, Songs of the Gorilla Nation. In a review for The New York Times, Natalie Angier writes that the book "is as much a rhapsody to gorillas as it is an anatomy of autism. It was through getting to know the gorillas at the Woodland Park Zoo in Seattle as an adult that Prince-Hughes began to feel, for the first time, connected, safe, understood." In a review for Booklist, Nancy Bent writes, "The author's accounts of her early childhood are intensely moving as she describes how she viewed her world and how she tried to deal with it. What makes this book unique is the author's discovery of the gorillas at Seattle's Woodland Park Zoo, and how she learned about personal relationships, the need for companionship, and the need for a group to belong to by watching them."

A review for Publishers Weekly states, "By quietly, calmly watching the gorillas interact, Prince-Hughes learns about emotions like love, anger, concern and humor—feelings she could never understand in the purely human world." Kirkus Reviews writes, "She developed deep empathy with these primates, referred to here as "gorilla people" because in her view they fulfill all the criteria for personhood, serving as models of gentle care, protectiveness, acceptance, and love." In a review for Library Journal, Corey Seeman writes, "Her relationship with gorillas is valuable in showing her journey toward reengagement with others, but lengthy descriptions of gorilla behavior bog down her story. Despite this shortcoming, the book is recommended for academic and public libraries with disability and ASD collections."

== Selected works ==
- The Archetype of the Ape-man: The Phenomenological Archaeology of a Relic Hominid Ancestor, 2000, ISBN 978-1-58112-119-3
- Adam, 2001, ISBN 978-1-890711-10-8
- Gorillas Among Us: A Primate Ethnographer's Book of Days, 2001, ISBN 978-0-8165-2151-7
- Aquamarine Blue 5: Personal Stories of College Students with Autism (editor), 2002, ISBN 978-1-4000-8092-2
- Songs of the Gorilla Nation: My Journey Through Autism, 2004, ISBN 1-4000-5058-8
- Expecting Teryk: An Exceptional Path to Parenthood, 2005, ISBN 978-0-8040-1079-5 (hbk), ISBN 978-0-8040-1080-1 (pbk)
- Passing as Human / Freak Nation: How I Discovered That No One Is Normal, 2009, ISBN 9780307345530
- Circus of Souls: How I Discovered We are All Freaks Passing as Normal , 2013, ISBN 978-0-307-34553-0

== Personal life ==
Prince-Hughes and her former partner Tara Hughes, an English professor, have a son.

== See also ==
- Gunilla Gerland
- Nim Chimpsky
- Jane Goodall
- Koko
- Louis Leakey
- Sociobiology
