= Spaces on the Spectrum =

2024 book by Catherine Tan

Spaces on the Spectrum: How Autism Movements Resist Experts and Create Knowledge
- Cover of the 2024 Columbia University Press edition
- Authors: Catherine Tan
- Language: English
- Subjects: Sociology; Autism
- Publisher: Columbia University Press
- Publication date: 2024
- Publication place: USA
- Media type: Print (hardcover, Paperback)
- Pages: 289
- Awards: Donald W. Light Award for Applied or Public Practice of Medical Sociology (2025); Outstanding Publication in the Sociology of Disability Award (2024); Robert K. Merton Award (2025)
- ISBN: 978-0-23-120612-9

Spaces on the Spectrum: How Autism Movements Resist Experts and Create Knowledge is a 2024 book by the sociologist Catherine Tan, published by Columbia University Press. The book is an ethnographic engagement with the autism rights movement and those advocating for a biomedical model for the condition which frame it as a chronic illness. The book received the 2025 Donald W. Light Award for Applied or Public Practice of Medical Sociology from the American Sociological Association's Section on Medical Sociology. The book also received the 2024 Outstanding Publication in the Sociology of Disability Award from the ASA's Section on Disability in Society. Additionally, the book received the 2025 Robert K. Merton Award from the ASA's Section on Science, Knowledge and Technology.

== Description ==
Spaces on the Spectrum is an ethographic study of two social movements which advocate for different ways to understand autism. One is an alternative biomedical movement which is primarily led by the parents of autistic children, the other is a self-advocacy movement focused on the achievement of rights for autistic people. The book provides a study of the different experiences and perspectives of these groups and how they engage with expertise and position themselves relative to mainstream medicine.

== Reception ==
Alexandra Brewer, reviewing the book in Social Forces, wrote that it "represents a powerful contribution to medical sociology" and described it as "a masterpiece of qualitative research design and ethnographic writing".

Morgan Sanchez, reviewing for Contemporary Sociology: A Journal of Reviews, described the book as "a significant contribution to the fields of disability studies and social movements" which "addresses a crucial gap in social movement research". Sanchez said that the book "challenges readers to rethink the nature of expertise and community, and the ways in which knowledge is produced and validated".

Jason Turowetz, in a review for Symobolic Interaction, called the book "a valuable, timely, and welcome contribution to the growing sociological literature on autism". Turowetz praised Tan for her "humane portrayl of her participants and their lived experience".

Writing for Sociology of Health & Illness, Katrine A. Callander said that the book "illustrates how marginalised groups challenge dominant narratives and considers how knowledge production is influenced by identity and lived experience". Callander wrote that the book could "possibily benefit from further nuanced exploration of intersectionality" but that it "provides a valuable and multifaceted contribution" concerning "autistic lived experiences as a source of authority".

=== Awards ===
- ASA Section on Medical Sociology's 2025 Donald W. Light Award for Applied or Public Practice of Medical Sociology.
- ASA Section on Disability in Society's 2024 Outstanding Publication in the Sociology of Disability Award.
- ASA Section on Science, Knowledge and Technology's 2025 Robert K. Merton Award.
