= Gunilla Gerland =

Author, lecturer and debater on the topic of Asperger syndrome

- Born: 1963 (age 62–63); Stockholm, Sweden
- Known for: writer on autism and Asperger syndrome
- Notable work: A Real Person: Life on the Outside; Secrets to Success for Professionals in the Autism Field: An Insider's Guide to Understanding the Autism Spectrum, the Environment and Your Role
- Website: www.pavus.se

Gunilla Gerland (born 1963) is a Swedish author and lecturer on the topic of autism. Her most notable written works include Secrets to Success for Professionals in the Autism Field: An Insider's Guide to Understanding the Autism Spectrum, the Environment and Your Role and her autobiography A Real Person: Life on the Outside.

== Biography ==
Gunilla Gerland was raised in Stockholm, Sweden. Her father was abusive and eventually left her family, and her mother had alcoholism. Gerland left home at age 16, moved to Spain, and eventually returned to Stockholm. At age 29, she received a diagnosis of Asperger syndrome.

Her 1996 autobiography, entitled A Real Person: Life on the Outside (original Swedish title: En Riktig Människa), describes growing up with Asperger syndrome in an unsympathetic environment. After her autobiography was published, Gerland became an advocate and educator about autism. She also participated in research studies, and has been described as "one of the pioneers of autistic participation in research on autism" by Anna Stenning, writing for Neurodiversity Studies: A New Critical Paradigm in 2020.

She continued to write, also lecture and debate on issues related to Asperger syndrome and the autism spectrum. She has also worked as a counsellor and educator in the field in Stockholm. Her writings have been cited in work concerning the autism spectrum and autism-related problems such as prosopagnosia, in addition to ways in which autism is analysed and discussed.

== Reception ==
In a review of A Real Person for The Times, Colette Forder writes, "Gerland's story is a challenging one to read: a violent, sadistic father, a drunk and increasingly unstable mother, a childhood of confusion and loneliness." In a review for Times Higher Education, Nicholas Tucker writes that the message of the book "bears on all adult relationships with children. When faced by behaviour that seems inexplicable or even perverse, still try to understand always. One of the greatest human follies is to assume that others are either just like oneself or else should be, once they have seen reason. Gerland speaks up for all nonconforming children, in an age of growing educational conformity: what she has to say deserves to be taken seriously."

Her autobiography was one of several analyzed in an article about autism-friendly architecture published in the Journal of Housing and the Built Environment, and it was analyzed in an article published in the journal Metaphilosophy. It was also discussed in an article published in the Teaching Exceptional Children journal as part of a trend of autobiographical works that are useful for the field of special education. Her autobiography was also analyzed in a study of personal narratives published in the Psychotherapy and Psychosomatics journal. Gerland, her autobiography, as well as the study of her autobiography were discussed by Anna Stenning in the "Understanding empathy through a study of autistic life writing" chapter of Neurodiversity Studies: A New Critical Paradigm.

In a review of Finding out about Asperger Syndrome, High Functioning Autism and PDD in Tizard Learning Disability Review, Ruth Levere writes, "the idea of a brief, pocket-sized book to educate young people with Asperger's Syndrome about the condition is a good idea. However, the content should be more comprehensive than this volume and it would be helpful if it could include references to more detailed texts for those who would want to extend their knowledge of the condition."

In a review of Secrets to Success for Professionals in the Autism Field: An Insider's Guide to Understanding the Autism Spectrum, the Environment and Your Role in the International Journal of Developmental Disabilities, Simon Rose writes, "The chatty style makes it feel almost as if you are having a conversation with the author, but may lack the clarity of some more scientific texts - however this is more than compensated through the use of examples and lists." Rose also writes, "Gerlands personal experience with autism also comes across in the book, allowing her to empathise and relate to autism spectrum disorders in a way that others may be unable to." Simon Jones ranked the book as excellent and writes for Nursing Standard, "Who could not be drawn to a book with chapter titles such as 'How it can be a constructive action to smash a window', 'Good aids that no one uses' and 'CRAP' - thoughts on the use of confirmation or rewards, the idea of being affirmative, and why punishments do not work."

== Selected works ==
- 1996 - A Real Person: Life on the Outside. Tr. Joan Tate. ISBN 9780285636620
- 1997 - It is good to ask ... A book about Asperger's syndrome and high-functioning autism
- 1998 - On where warranted - for humanity, "biologism" and autism (ed.)
- Sainsbury, Clare; Gerland, Gunilla (1999). "An autistic perspective on live company". Journal of Child Psychotherapy. 25: 153–161. doi:10.1080/00754179908260286.
- 2000 - How to understand and treat aggressive and self-injurious behavior in autism? An overview of treatment models and related factors
- 2000 - Finding Out About Asperger's Syndrome, High-Functioning Autism and PDD. ISBN 9781853028403
- 2002 - Autism - problems and opportunities (with Göran Hartman and Solveig Larsson)
- 2003 - Asperger's syndrome - and then?
- 2004 - Autism: relationships and sexuality
- 2010 - Working with Asperger's Syndrome - The craftsmanship and the professional role
- 2010 - Children who raises concerns: see, understand and help preschoolers with a different development (with Ulrika Aspeflo)
- 2013 - Secrets to Success for Professionals in the Autism Field: An Insider's Guide to Understanding the Autism Sprectrum, the Environment and Your Role. ISBN 9781849053709

== See also ==
- Dawn Prince-Hughes
