= Michelle Dawson =

Canadian autism researcher

- Born: 1961 (age 64–65)
- Known for: criticisms regarding ABA-based autism interventions, research on enhanced perceptual functioning and strengths of autistic people as well as autistic intelligence
- Scientific career
- Fields: Autism research
- Workplaces: Autism Specialized Clinic of Hôpital Rivière-des-Prairies
- Website: No Autistics Allowed: Explorations in discrimination against autistics

Michelle Dawson (born 1961) is a Canadian autism researcher who was diagnosed with autism in 1993–1994. Since 2004, she has worked as an autism researcher affiliated with the Autism Specialized Clinic of Hôpital Rivière-des-Prairies in Montreal, Quebec, Canada.

== Career ==
In 2004, Dawson joined Laurent Mottron's research team. Dawson says that most scientists try to determine how autistic brains are broken, she finds it more useful to examine how autistic brains work rather than how they are broken. She has collaborated with Mottron to publish research papers, with Mottron estimating that Dawson contributes about 20% to the finished product.

She wrote a paper challenging the ethical and scientific foundations of Applied Behavior Analysis (ABA)-based autism interventions. She also challenged the medical necessity of ABA for individuals with autism in the Supreme Court of Canada in Auton v. British Columbia, 3 S.C.R. 657.

== Personal ==
She was diagnosed with an autism spectrum disorder in 1993–1994. Born in 1961, Dawson was not diagnosed as a child. Michelle Dawson is a high school graduate.

Before working under Laurent Mottron, Dawson was a postal worker for the Canada Post until she took a leave of absence in 2002. Dawson filed two human rights complaints against the Canada Post, alleging that she was being discriminated against. The first complaint was settled out of court. The second complaint was the first autism-related case taken to the Canadian Human Rights Tribunal, where she represented herself. She won this complaint.

Dawson received an honorary doctorate from the Université de Montréal in June 2013

In 2015, she was recognized by the Québec Human Rights and Youth Rights Commission for her human rights work.

She was awarded the Ordre de Montréal in 2017. The award states "She has documented the poverty of scientific and ethical standards in autism intervention research, and the resulting harm to autistic people. Contrary to long-entrenched views, she believes that autistics deserve the same basic rights as the rest of humanity. She also believes that in research, as elsewhere, autistic and non-autistic people should work together as equals."

== Selected works ==
- Gernsbacher, Morton Ann; Dawson, Michelle; Goldsmith, H. Hill (2005). "Three Reasons Not to Believe in an Autism Epidemic". Current Directions in Psychological Science. 14 (2). SAGE Publications: 55–58. doi:10.1111/j.0963-7214.2005.00334.x. ISSN 0963-7214. PMC 4232964. PMID 25404790.
- Mottron, Laurent; Dawson, Michelle; Soulières, Isabelle; Hubert, Benedicte; Burack, Jake (2006). "Enhanced Perceptual Functioning in Autism: An Update, and Eight Principles of Autistic Perception". Journal of Autism and Developmental Disorders. 36 (1). Springer Science and Business Media LLC: 27–43. doi:10.1007/s10803-005-0040-7. ISSN 0162-3257. PMID 16453071. S2CID 327253.
- Caron, M.-J.; Mottron, Laurent; Berthiaume, C.; Dawson, Michelle (2006-07-01). "Cognitive mechanisms, specificity and neural underpinnings of visuospatial peaks in autism". Brain. 129 (7). Oxford University Press (OUP): 1789–1802. doi:10.1093/brain/awl072. ISSN 0006-8950. PMID 16597652.
- Dawson, Michelle; Soulières, Isabelle; Gernsbacher, Morton Ann; Mottron, Laurent (2007). "The Level and Nature of Autistic Intelligence". Psychological Science. 18 (8). SAGE Publications: 657–662. doi:10.1111/j.1467-9280.2007.01954.x. ISSN 0956-7976. PMC 4287210. PMID 17680932.
- Dawson, Michelle (2018). "Splinter Skills and Cognitive Strengths in Autism". In Ellen Braaten (ed.). The SAGE Encyclopedia of Intellectual and Developmental Disorders. Thousand Oaks, CA: SAGE Publications, Inc. doi:10.4135/9781483392271.n480. ISBN 978-1-4833-9229-5.
- Dawson, Michelle (2018). "Verbal Intelligence". In Fred Volkmar (ed.). Encyclopedia of Autism Spectrum Disorders. New York, NY: Springer New York. pp. 1–8. doi:10.1007/978-1-4614-6435-8_375-3. ISBN 978-1-4614-6435-8.
