= Psychologs =

Mental health magazine

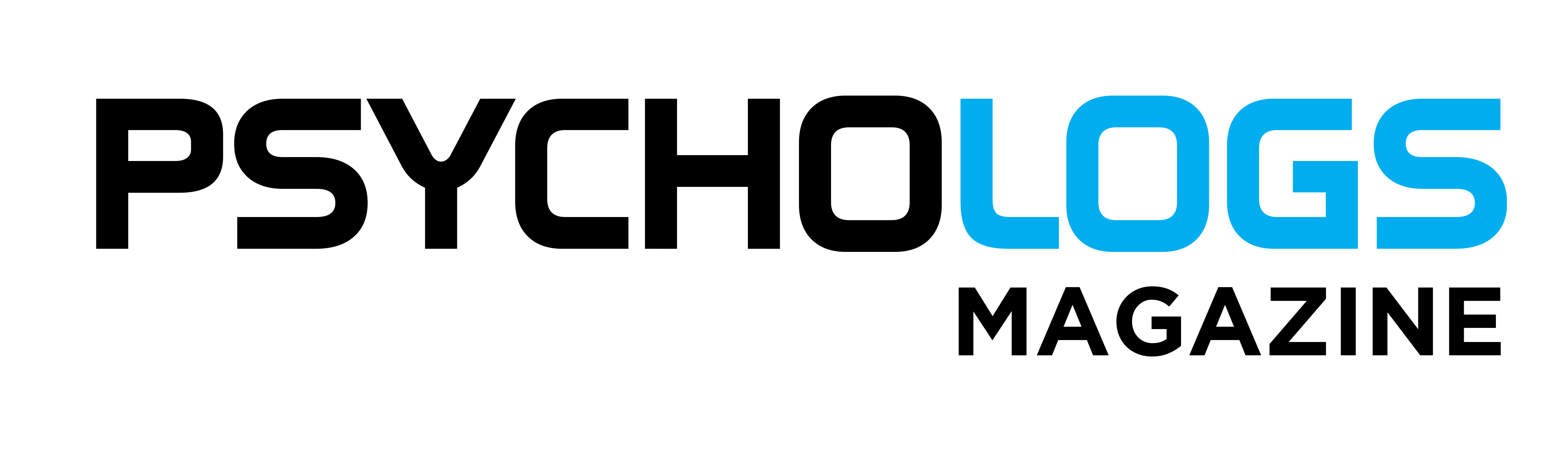
- Psychologs Magazine
- Editor in Chief: Arvind Otta
- Categories: Mental Health Magazine
- Frequency: Monthly
- Publisher: Utsaah Psychological Services Pvt. Ltd.
- Country: India
- Based in: Delhi
- Language: English
- Website: Official Website
- ISSN: 2583-4193

Psychologs is a monthly mental health print magazine publishing in English in Delhi, India. Editorial board members and mental health experts from various institutions and hospitals write on various issues of mental health in detail. The magazine focuses on mental health and well being and the rights of the mental health patient in India. The magazine organizes programs on various psychological issues across the country. It provides a platform for mental health professionals to share their knowledge, expertise and perspectives on various mental health topics with the general public through articles, interviews and columns. The magazine is seen as a reliable source on its topics in India.

== Circulation and readership ==
The magazine is available in both print and electronic versions. Print magazine's monthly circulation is 150,000 in India, with 12.25 readers per magazine, and the electronic magazine's monthly circulation is 20 lakh. Psychologs magazine's directory for mental health professionals and rehabilitation professionals is widely used in India.

== Mental health awareness ==
The magazine organizes conferences, meetings and events to promote mental health and well-being. Many Bollywood actors like Sasural Simar Ka and Rab Ne Bana Di Jodi actor Rushad Rana, and Nach Baliye famed Bakhtiyaar Irani joined the mental health campaign of Psychologs magazine.

== Mental Health Award ==
Psychologs distributes the Mental Health Award to people who are doing extraordinary work in the field of mental health awareness.

== Notable contributors ==
- Jagannath Prasad Das
- Girishwar Misra
