= Frances Tustin =

British psychotherapist

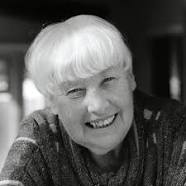
- from Frances Tustin Memorial Trust
- Born: Frances Daisy Vickers; October 15, 1913; Darlington, County Durham, England
- Died: 1994 (aged 80–81); London, England
- Spouse: Arnold Tustin
- Scientific career
- Fields: Psychotherapy
- Workplaces: University of London

Frances Tustin (born Frances Daisy Vickers; 1913) was a pioneering British child psychotherapist renowned for her work with children with autism in the 1950s. She became a teacher and began studying psychoanalysis in 1943 at the University of London.

Following the war, in 1950 she began the child psychotherapy training headed by the psychoanalyst Esther Bick in the children's department of London's Tavistock Clinic, which was chaired by the pioneer in child development John Bowlby.

== Psychotherapy career ==
In the mid-1950s she traveled to the US to work at the James Jackson Putnam Center which treated autistic children through what today is seen as behavior therapy and began to extensively study, research and write about autism in what are some of the earliest writings on the condition.

She returned to London and published her first book Autism and Childhood Psychosis in 1972 followed by three more books and numerous journal articles, translated worldwide, up until her death, at age 81, in 1994.

== Legacy ==
Her contribution to the development of psychoanalysis was recognized in 1984 by the British Psychoanalytical Society, which awarded her the rare status of Honorary Affiliate Member.

The Frances Tustin Memorial Trust awards an annual prize for papers addressing the treatment of autistic states in children, adolescents or adults.

== Controversy ==
At the beginning of the 21st century, with a gestalt shift in autism studies underway, Tustin's views on autism and the medical treatment have come under severe attack from self-advocating Autistic groups and some peer-reviewed articles.
