= Laurent Mottron =

French-Canadian psychiatrist & academic

- Born: June 13, 1952 (age 74); Bléré, France
- Occupation: Psychiatrist
- Scientific career
- Fields: cognitive neuroscience
- Workplaces: University of Montreal

Laurent Mottron (born June 13, 1952) is a psychiatrist, researcher, and a professor at Montreal University. He is a specialist in cognitive neuroscience research in autism at the University of Montreal.

== Biography ==
He studied medicine at the University François-Rabelais (Tours) and in 1981 a medical thesis entitled how the opposition neurosis / psychosis works, and defended in 1983, a state thesis in humanities and sciences, entitled Common constraints to the acquisition, theory and pathology of the deixis at the University Paris 5-René Descartes. He has lived in Quebec since 1990, where he is now a full professor in the Department of Psychiatry at the Université de Montréal. He holds the Marcel and Rolande Gosselin Research Chair in Cognitive Neuroscience of Autism at the University of Montreal since 2008, and is a fellow of the Canadian Academy of Health Sciences since 2019. Since 1997, his research was funded by the Canadian Institutes of Health Research (CIHR). Several of his students now pursue an academic career, including Isabelle Soulières and Claudine Jacques. One of the particularities of his group is to regularly include autistic researchers, as Michelle Dawson, with whom he has been collaborating for more than fifteen years. He is married to Quebec researcher Sylvie Belleville and is the father of three children, including singer and songwriter Pierre Mottron.

== Areas of research ==
He has authored over 150 scientific papers on cognitive neuroscience and autism. His early work is part of the general neuropsychology of pervasive developmental disorders and focuses on visual and auditory perception in savant and non-savant autism, studied through cognitive tasks and brain imaging. He is also interested in re-examining the role of intellectual disability, identifiable mutations and epilepsy in primary and syndromic autism, and the inclusion of autistic researchers in science. Along with the cognitive neuroscience research group on autism in Montreal, he develops the model of Enhanced Perceptual Functioning (2006), an influencing theory for interpreting cognitive and imaging data in autism. This model has been extended recently by that of veridical mapping (2013), on the strengths and talents of autistic, and the trigger-threshold-target model (2014), on the links between mutations involved in autism, microstructural and regional plasticity, and enhanced perceptual functioning. In the area of intervention, he and his collaborators Véronique Langlois and Valérie Courchesne develop an intervention program based on autistic forces. More recently, he and his collaborators are trying to re-construct de novo "prototypical" phenotype of this condition, in order to reason its uncontrolled increasing reported prevalence.

== Position Statements ==
In a letter published by Le Monde in 2012, Laurent Mottron expresses that he left France for Canada as opposed to the psychoanalytic approach of autism: "psychoanalysis has nothing to say or to do with the autism. Psychoanalysis is a belief, a practice that must remain limited to a relationship between consenting adults. It must be taken out of the care, especially of children (and not just autism). I went to Canada to flee that twenty years ago’’. In this letter, he also expresses his opposition to the ABA method, which he considers "scientifically unjustified and ethically questionable". In Cerveau & Psycho, he writes: "Psychoanalysis has brought nothing to the understanding or the management of autism, neither in terms of practices nor in terms of knowledge".

== Publications ==
- Mottron L, Bzdok D. Autism Spectrum Heterogeneity: Fact or Artifact? Mol Psychiatry. 2020 Apr 30. doi: 10.1038/s41380-020-0748-y Online ahead of print. PMID 32355335 Open Access
- Rødgaard E-M, Jensen K, Vergnes J-N, Soulières I, Mottron L. Temporal changes in effect sizes of studies Comparing individuals with and without Autism: A meta-analysis. JAMA Psychiatry. Published online August 21, 2019. doi:10.1001/jamapsychiatry.2019.1956. PMID 31433441 [archive] Open Access [archive]
- Ostrolenk, A., Forgeot d’Arc, B., Jelenic, P., Samson, F., Mottron, L. Hyperlexia: systematic review, neurocognitive modeling, and outcome, Neuroscience and Biobehavioral review, 2017 Aug;79:134-149. doi: 10.1016/j.neubiorev.2017.04.029. Epub 2017 May 3. PMID 28478182 [archive]
- Mottron, L. Should we change targets and methods of early intervention in autism, in favor of a strengths-based education?. European child and adolescent psychiatry, 2017 Jul;26(7):815-825. doi:10.1007/s00787-017-0955-5; Epub 2017 Feb 8. PMID 28181042 [archive] Open Access [archive]
- Mottron L, Belleville S, Rouleau GA, Collignon O (2014). Linking neocortical, cognitive, and genetic variability in autism with alterations of brain plasticity: The Trigger-Threshold-Target model. Neurosci Biobehav Rev. Aug 21. PMID 25155242 [archive] Open access
- Mottron L, Bouvet L, Bonnel A, Samson F, Burack JA, Dawson M, Heaton P (February 2013). "Veridical mapping in the development of exceptional autistic abilities". Neuroscience and Biobehavioral Reviews. 37 (2): 209–28. doi:10.1016/j.neubiorev.2012.11.016. PMID 23219745. Open Access
- Samson F, Mottron L, Soulières I, Zeffiro TA (July 2012). "Enhanced visual functioning in autism: an ALE meta-analysis". Human Brain Mapping. 33 (7): 1553–81. doi:10.1002/hbm.21307. PMC 6870295. PMID 21465627.
- Samson F, Hyde KL, Bertone A, Soulières I, Mendrek A, Ahad P, Mottron L, Zeffiro TA (February 2011). "Atypical processing of auditory temporal complexity in autistics". Neuropsychologia. 49 (3): 546–55. doi:10.1016/j.neuropsychologia.2010.12.033. PMID 21192958. S2CID 207236618.
- Mottron L (November 2011). "Changing perceptions: The power of autism". Nature. 479 (7371): 33–5. Bibcode:2011Natur.479...33M. doi:10.1038/479033a. PMID 22051659. S2CID 4431484.
- All Publications of Laurent Mottron on PubMed

== Books ==
- Mottron L (2004). L'autisme : une autre intelligence. Diagnostic, cognition et support des personnes autistes sans déficience intellectuelle. Liège: Mardaga. ISBN 978-2-87009-869-1.
- Mottron L (2016) L'intervention précoce pour enfants autistes. Liège, Mardaga, ISBN
