= Alternative Baseball =

U.S. nonprofit organization

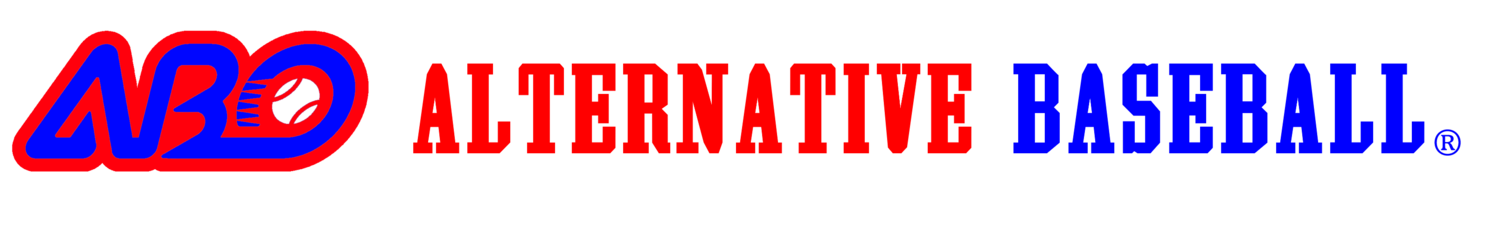
- Abbreviation: ABO
- Founded: January 5, 2016; 10 years ago
- Founder: Taylor C. Duncan
- Type: 501(c)(3) Nonprofit organization
- Location: Dallas, Georgia
- Region served: United States
- Key people: Taylor C. Duncan (founder/chief executive officer); Cindy Duncan (secretary/treasurer); Dr. Roger Garret (chairman of the board); Floyd Hillman (board member)
- Affiliations: WBSC Americas
- Website: alternativebaseball.org

Alternative Baseball, officially Alternative Baseball Organization Inc. (ABO), is an American developmental program and 501(c)(3) nonprofit organization based in Dallas, Georgia, United States. It provides year-round baseball training, exhibitions, and activities for teens and adults (ages 15+) with autism and other disabilities throughout the United States.

== Founder ==
In 2016, Taylor Duncan founded the Alternative Baseball Organization in Dallas, Georgia.

As a child, Duncan was denied opportunities to participate in sports due to his autism, some coaches deeming his disability a safety issue. Duncan said there were fewer opportunities to play baseball the older he got. He saw the need for more services for people with disabilities to play sports and continue learning life skills. Duncan explains that after high school, opportunities for people with disabilities to participate in sports can completely disappear. Duncan wanted to give teens and adults with disabilities the opportunity to play in a traditional baseball setting free of judgment, and founded the Alternative Baseball Organization. The organization focuses on developing physical and social skills through hands-on experience in all games—using Major League Baseball rules—and practices. Some players have since applied their skills to other areas of their lives, including the workplace.

In June 2025, during an event hosted by Alternative Baseball and the Atlanta Braves organization, Duncan hit the first over-the-fence home run by an athlete with a disability in organizational history after nine years of hosting events.

== Rules ==
Players can have any or no experience in baseball to participate. The baseball games are played using the baseball rules published by Major League Baseball. Many games are played between 7-9 innings. Players pitch and catch behind the plate in Alternative Baseball. The only adaptation is the type of ball used; it is larger and softer to prevent injuries.

== See also ==
- Amateur baseball in the United States
- Parasports
