= Pierre Mottron =

French singer-songwriter (born 1987)

Mottron
- Born: 27 March 1987 (age 38)
- Origin: Tours, France
- Genres: Electronic; Pop
- Years active: 2009–present
- Label: PIAS
- Members: Mottron (vocals, music, arrangements)

Mottron is a French singer and songwriter born on 27 March 1987, in Tours, France.

== Style ==
Mottron's music is influenced by many backgrounds such as classical music, jazz, pop, folk music as well as minimal techno which he uses to create a unique mixture of composition and arrangements

Mottron has so far released 3 records under his own name and one with the project Malnoïa.

== Discography ==
=== Studio work ===
- Home Safe (2014)
1. "Lust"
2. "What would happen"
3. "Indecent"
4. "O Father"
5. "They Know"
- Colorful! (2013)
1. "Colorful"
2. "Solar Ray"
3. "Sleep"
4. "Glass Bowl"
- Endure and Survive (2012)
1. "Bone from the world's chest"
2. "I Surrender"
3. "Curves"
4. "Comfortable"
5. "Painted life"
- Surface of Arts (2009)
1. "Time's"
2. "Curtains down"
3. "Carrousel"
4. "Bohemian intermission"
5. "The bridge of sighs"
6. "Another moral dilemma"
7. "Schism"
8. "Pandora's box"
9. "Twinkle"
10. "I killed music"
11. "Inyaworda-Nayo"
12. "Surface of art"

=== Singles ===
- They Know (2014)
- Sleep (2013)
- Colorful! (2013)
- Bone From the World's Chest (2012)
- Curves (2012)
- Time's (2009)
