= Management of autism =

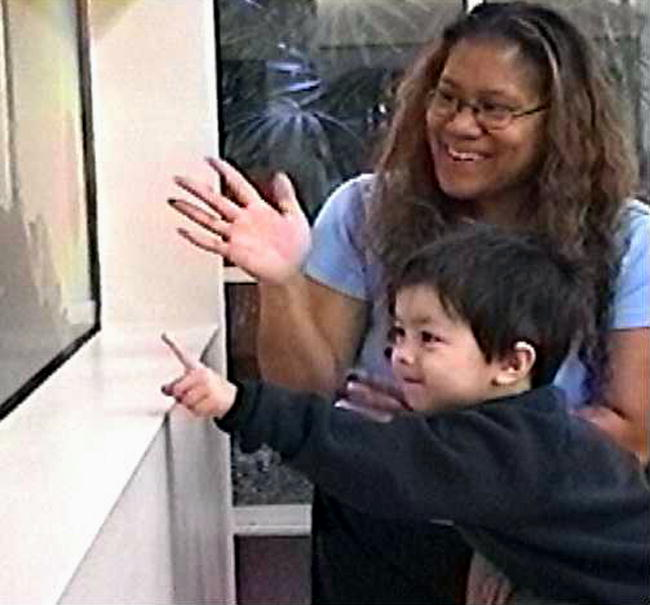
- A three-year-old with autism points to fish in an aquarium, as part of an experiment (2004) on the effect of intensive shared-attention training on language development.

Management of autism encompasses educational and psychosocial interventions as well as medical management, all designed to improve the communication, learning, and adaptive skills of autistic people. Such methods of therapy seek to aid autistic people in dealing with difficulties and increase their functional independence. Treatment is typically catered to the person's needs. Training and support are also given to families of those diagnosed with autism.

Available approaches include applied behavior analysis (ABA), developmental models, structured teaching, speech and language therapy, social skills therapy, and occupational therapy. ABA is a behavioral therapy that aims to teach autistic children certain social and other behaviors by prompting using rewards and reinforcement learning through play, expressive labeling, and requesting as well as reduce aggressive and self-injurious behavior by assessing its environmental causes and reinforcing replacement behaviors. Occupational therapists work with autistic children by creating interventions that promote social interaction like sharing and cooperation. They also support the autistic child by helping them work through a dilemma as the OT imitates the child and waiting for a response from the child. For autistic adults, key treatment issues include residential care, job training and placement, sexuality, social skills, and estate planning.

Studies of interventions have some methodological problems that prevent definitive conclusions about efficacy. Although many psychosocial interventions have some positive evidence, suggesting that some form of treatment is preferable to no treatment, the systematic reviews have reported that the quality of these studies has generally been poor, their clinical results are mostly tentative, and there is little evidence for the relative effectiveness of treatment options. Intensive, sustained special education programs and behavior therapy early in life can help children with ASD acquire self-care, social, and job skills, and often can improve functioning, and decrease severity of the signs and observed behaviors thought of as maladaptive; Early, intensive ABA has demonstrated effectiveness, but many randomized clinical studies lacked adverse event monitoring, although such adverse effects may be common. The limited research on the effectiveness of adult residential programs shows mixed results.

Medical management addresses co-occurring challenges such as irritability, hyperactivity, anxiety, and sleep disturbances rather than core social and communication traits. Many such treatments have been prescribed off-label in order to target specific symptoms. Antipsychotic medications such as risperidone and aripiprazole can reduce severe behavioral issues, while stimulants may help with attention and activity levels. Pharmacological treatments, including antidepressants and antipsychotics, may be prescribed to manage co-occurring conditions such as anxiety, depression, or irritability, but they do not treat the underlying characteristics of autism. Selective serotonin reuptake inhibitors, oxytocin, and other agents have shown inconsistent results. Parents of autistic children often encounter conflicting advice, unproven "miracle" treatments, and misleading claims in efforts to improve symptoms of a largely genetic disorder that currently has no cure. While many alternative or complementary treatments, including dietary restrictions, chelation, hyperbaric oxygen therapy, sensory integration, and acupuncture, lack scientific support and may pose health or financial risks, some evidence exists that limited mindfulness-based interventions can improve mental health in adults with autism.

== Applied behavior analysis ==
Applied behavior analysis (ABA) is one of the most widely used behavioral interventions for autistic children and is recommended in some clinical guidelines; however, its effectiveness and potential harms remain subjects of ongoing debate in the scientific literature.

Applied behavior analysis (ABA) is the applied research field of the science of behavior analysis, and it underpins a wide range of techniques used to treat autism and many other behaviors and diagnoses, including those who are patients in rehab or in whom a behavior change is desired. ABA-based interventions focus on teaching tasks one-on-one using the behaviorist principles of stimulus, response and reward, and on reliable measurement and objective evaluation of observed behavior.

The use of technology has begun to be implemented in ABA therapy for the treatment of autism. Robots, gamification, image processing, storyboards, augmented reality, and web systems have been shown to be useful in the treatment of autism. These technologies are used to teach children with autism skill acquisition. The web programs were designed to address skills such as attention, social behavior, communication, or reading.

=== Criticisms and considerations ===
While ABA is often described as a "gold standard" intervention for autism, it is not without criticism. Considered the most evidence-based and widely used intervention for autism, ABA has also been the subject of ethical debate. Some key considerations include:

- The need to ensure ethically appropriate goals: interventions must respect the individual's dignity, preferences and long-term well-being, rather than simply enforcing compliance.
- The importance of generalisation and maintenance of learned behaviours — not just training in a specific context.
- Access and implementation challenges: availability of trained practitioners, cost, family involvement and setting quality all impact outcomes.

Critics argue that ABA can, in some forms, overemphasize compliance or normalization rather than fostering autonomy and self-advocacy. Recent scholarship emphasizes the importance of ensuring that ABA interventions respect individual dignity, focus on meaningful life outcomes, and are implemented with compassion and consent.

Some autistic individuals and advocacy groups argue that ABA can be distressing and may contribute to PTSD symptoms, while others consider it an effective intervention for skill development. The Autistic Self Advocacy Network (ASAN) opposed the use of ABA, arguing that it encourages masking and compliance rather than supporting autistic identity. However, ABA remains a widely used intervention among clinicians and educators.

Some diagnosed with ASD or similar disorders advocate against behavioral therapies more broadly, like ABA and CBT, often as part of the autism rights movement, on the grounds that these approaches frequently reinforce the demand on autistic people to mask their neurodivergent characteristics or behaviors to favor a more 'neurotypical' and narrow conception of normality. In the case of CBT and talking therapies, the effectiveness varies, with many reporting that they appeared 'too self-aware' to gain significant benefit, as the therapy was designed with neurotypical people in mind. Systematic reviews indicate that cognitive behavioral therapy (CBT) may be effective for reducing anxiety symptoms in autistic children and adolescents, although evidence for its impact on core autistic traits is limited.

=== Early intensive behavioural intervention ===
Early intensive behavioural intervention (EIBI) is an intensive, ABA-based behavioural intervention for young children with autism spectrum disorder (ASD) and is one of the more commonly used treatments for ASD. Historically, EIBI developed from the UCLA Young Autism Project (often called the Lovaas model). Common descriptions of EIBI emphasize three features: (1) structured teaching procedures such as discrete trial training; (2) a high staff-to-child ratio, often 1:1 early in treatment; and (3) delivery at high intensity (commonly about 20–40 hours per week) for extended periods (often one to four years) in home and/or school contexts. EIBI programs are typically overseen by practitioners trained in applied behaviour analysis and are often delivered using a structured curriculum or manual that specifies targets and teaching sequences.

EIBI is sometimes conflated with ABA. ABA refers to the broader science and set of principles underlying behaviour change, whereas EIBI is one intervention model that applies ABA methods in an intensive, comprehensive format; ABA therefore encompasses far more than EIBI alone.

Clinical guidance generally supports starting behavioural supports as early as possible for children with ASD, including during the diagnostic process when appropriate. Because ASD presentations and support needs vary widely, management is individualized and there is no single approach that is universally recommended for all children.

Across guidance documents, comprehensive intervention programs are often described as including elements such as: targeting core social-communication and related developmental skills; providing teaching in structured and predictable contexts; maintaining low student-to-teacher ratios; planning for generalization and maintenance; involving families; using functional approaches to challenging behaviour; and tracking progress over time to guide adjustments.

In EIBI, the core deficits of ASD are addressed through individualized intervention programs tailored to the child's current skills such as communication and social skills. These plans use behavioral techniques to teach new skills. A function-based approach is also used to reduce challenging behaviors that interfere with learning and to teach more appropriate replacement behaviors. EIBI remains one of the most requested comprehensive treatment models for ASD. Because EIBI continues to evolve over time, the evidence base needs to be updated periodically.

As stated by the Canadian Paediatric Society: "Behavioural interventions have emerged as the main evidence-based treatment for children with ASD." Behavioural interventions are typically grounded in ABA learning principles and implemented across different settings to teach skills and reduce learning-interfering behaviours. EIBI is one example within this broader category and is commonly delivered with structured supervision and a planned scope-and-sequence of teaching targets.

Early intensive behavioural interventions are often used with preschool-aged children (about 2–5 years old), and studies report some improvement evidence in adaptive functioning, IQ, and receptive and expressive language, although findings are variable across children and studies. In the United States, behavioural approaches—including EIBI—are among the most commonly recommended interventions. By comparison, Project AIM reported that NICE guidance in England has tended to prioritize lower-intensity social-communication interventions (such as PACT and JASPER) rather than recommending intensive behavioural programs as routine care.

==== Evidence base and limitations ====
For EIBI specifically, the 2018 Cochrane review rated the certainty of evidence for key outcomes as low to very low using GRADE criteria. Separately, Project AIM reported that the overall early-childhood autism intervention literature expanded substantially by 2021; across intervention types, effects differed by outcome domain and intervention category, and results were mixed rather than uniform. The updated Project AIM review included 252 studies, including 173 randomized controlled trials, and concluded that RCT evidence supports the effectiveness of some specific early-childhood interventions for some outcomes, with considerable variation across outcomes and approaches. A 2022 synthesis focusing on routine clinical care concluded that early behavioural interventions with established efficacy can produce beneficial effects in real-world services, while also emphasizing ongoing needs such as clearer program classification, more consistent outcome measurement, and stronger controlled follow-up designs.

Professional guidance describes EIBI as a comprehensive treatment model for young children, typically delivered as a comprehensive ABA program, and often discussed alongside other comprehensive approaches such as TEACCH and the Early Start Denver Model (ESDM).

=== Discrete trial training ===
Discrete trial training (DTT) is an applied behavior analysis teaching method developed by Ivar Lovaas at UCLA that breaks skills into small, repeatable steps taught with prompts, modeling and positive reinforcement. It is often used as part of early intensive behavioral intervention (EIBI) for autistic children.

=== Pivotal response training ===
Pivotal response treatment (PRT) is a naturalistic intervention derived from ABA principles. Instead of individual behaviors, it targets pivotal areas of a child's development, such as motivation, responsivity to multiple cues, self-management, and social initiations; it aims for widespread improvements in areas that are not specifically targeted. The child determines activities and objects that will be used in a PRT exchange. Intended attempts at the target behavior are rewarded with a natural reinforcer: for example, if a child attempts a request for a stuffed animal, the child receives the animal, not a piece of candy or other unrelated reinforcer.

=== Early Start Denver Model (ESDM) ===
Early Start Denver Model (ESDM) is a subtype of applied behavior analysis (ABA) designed for autistic toddlers and preschoolers, typically between 12 and 48 months of age. Developed in the 1980s by psychologists Sally J. Rogers and Geraldine Dawson, the model integrates behavioral, developmental, and relationship-based approaches to promote early learning. It emphasizes natural play routines, joint attention, and parent participation to build language, social interaction, imitation, and cognitive skills.

Research, including randomized controlled trials and meta-analyses, has found that ESDM can improve cognitive and language development and may reduce autism symptoms over time. The model is recognized internationally, including by the Centers for Disease Control and Prevention in the United States, the National Disability Insurance Scheme in Australia, and health authorities in France and Brazil.

== Educational interventions ==
Educational interventions attempt to help children not only to learn academic subjects and gain traditional readiness skills, but also to improve functional communication and spontaneity, enhance social skills such as joint attention, develop cognitive skills such as symbolic play, reduce disruptive behavior, and generalize learned skills by applying them to new situations. Several program models have been developed, which in practice often overlap and share many features, including:

- early intervention that is not dependent upon a definitive diagnosis;
- intense intervention, at least 25 hours per week, 12 months per year;
- low student/teacher ratio;
- family involvement, including training of parents;
- interaction with neurotypical peers;
- social stories, ABA and other visually based training;
- structure that includes predictable routine and clear physical boundaries to lessen distraction; and
- ongoing measurement of a systematically planned intervention, resulting in adjustments as needed.

Several educational intervention methods are available, as discussed below. They can take place at home, at school, or at a center devoted to autism treatment; they can be implemented by parents, teachers, speech and language therapists, and occupational therapists. A 2007 study found that augmenting a center-based program with weekly home visits by a special education teacher improved cognitive development and behavior.

Many intervention studies have methodological limitations, such as small sample sizes and inconsistent outcome measures, making it difficult to draw definitive conclusions about efficacy. Although many psychosocial interventions have some positive evidence, suggesting that some form of treatment is preferable to no treatment, the methodological quality of systematic reviews of these studies has generally been poor, their clinical results are mostly tentative, and there is little evidence for the relative effectiveness of treatment options. Concerns about outcome measures, such as their inconsistent use, most greatly affect how the results of scientific studies are interpreted. A 2009 Minnesota study found that parents follow behavioral treatment recommendations significantly less often than they follow medical recommendations, and that they adhere more often to reinforcement than to punishment recommendations. Intensive, sustained special education programs and behavior therapy early in life can help children acquire self-care, social, and job skills, and often improve functioning and decrease symptom severity and maladaptive behaviors; claims that intervention by around age three years is crucial are not substantiated. Mind-body therapies are frequently utilized by autistic individuals. However, there remains a lack of comprehensive examination into the specific types of mind-body therapies used for ASD and their intended outcomes.

=== TEACCH ===
Treatment and Education of Autistic and Related Communication Handicapped Children (TEACCH), which has come to be called "structured teaching", emphasizes structure by using organized physical environments, predictably sequenced activities, visual schedules and visually structured activities, and structured work/activity systems where each child can practice various tasks. Parents are taught to implement the treatment at home. It is effective at improving some skills, such as social skills and fine motor skills, but studies disagree about whether it is effective at improving other skills, such as communication and daily living skills. TEACCH programs also reduce parental stress.

=== SCERTS ===
The SCERTS model is an educational model for working with children with ASD. It was designed to help families, educators, and therapists work cooperatively together to maximize progress in supporting the child.

The acronym refers to the focus on:

- SC – social communication – the development of functional communication and emotional expression.
- ER – emotional regulation – the development of well-regulated emotions and ability to cope with stress.
- TS – transactional support – the implementation of supports to help families, educators, and therapists respond to children's needs, adapt the environment, and provide tools to enhance learning.

=== National education policies ===
==== U.S. ====
In the United States, there have been three major policies addressing special education in the United States. These policies were the Education for All Handicapped Children Act in 1975, the Individuals with Disabilities Education Act in 1997, and the No Child Left Behind in 2001. The development of those policies showed increased guidelines for special education and requirements; such as requiring states to fund special education, equality of opportunities, help with transitions after secondary schooling, requiring extra qualifications for special education teachers, and creating a more specific class setting for those with disabilities. The Individuals with Disabilities Education Act, specifically had a large impact on special education as public schools were then required to employ high qualified staff. In 2009, for one to be a Certified Autism Specialist the requirements included: a master's degree, two years of career experience working with the autism population, earn 14 continuing education hours in autism every two years, and register with the International Institute of Education.

===== Perceived disadvantages of autistic people in the U.S. in the 2010s =====
Martha Nussbaum discusses how education is one of the fertile functions that is important for the development of a person and their ability to achieve a multitude of other capabilities within society. autism can present challenges in traditional educational environments, particularly in areas such as imitation, observational learning, and communication. As of 2014, of all disabilities affecting the population, autism ranked third lowest in acceptance into a postsecondary education institution. In a 2012 study funded by the National Institute of Health, Shattuck et al. found that only 35% of autistics are enrolled in a 2 or 4 year college within the first two years after leaving high school compared to 40% of children who have a learning disability. Due to the growing need for a college education to obtain a job, this statistic shows how autistics are at a disadvantage in gaining many of the capabilities that Nussbaum discusses and makes education more than just a type of therapy for those with autism. According to the 2012 study by Shattuck, only 55% of children with autism participated in any paid employment within the first two years after high school. Furthermore, those with autism that come from low income families tend to have lower success in postsecondary schooling.

Oftentimes, schools lacked the resources to create (what at the time was considered) an optimal classroom setting for those 'in need of special education'. In 2014 in the United States, it could cost between $6,595 to $10,421 extra to educate a child with autism. In the 2011–2012 school year, the average cost of education for a public school student was $12,401. In some 2015 cases, the extra cost required to educate a child with autism nearly doubled the average cost to educate the average public school student. As the abilities of autistic people vary highly, it is highly challenging to create a standardized curriculum that will fit all autistic learning needs. In the United States, in 2014 many school districts required schools to meet the needs of disabled students, regardless of the number of children with disabilities there are in the school. This combined with a shortage of licensed special education teachers has created a deficiency in the special education system. In 2011 the shortage caused some states to give temporary special education licenses to teachers with the caveat that they receive a license within a few years.

==== Mexico ====
In 1993, Mexico passed an education law that called for the inclusion of those with disabilities. This law was very important for Mexico education, however, there have been issues in implementing it due to a lack of resources.

==== United Nations and internationally ====
There have also been multiple international groups that have issued reports addressing issues in special education. The United Nations on "International Norms and Standards relating to Disability" in 1998. This report cites multiple conventions, statements, declarations, and other reports such as: The Universal Declaration of Human Rights, The Salamanca Statement, the Sundberg Declaration, the Copenhagen Declaration and Programme of Action, and many others. One main point that the report emphasizes is the necessity for education to be a human right. The report also states that the "quality of education should be equal to that of persons without disabilities." The other main points brought up by the report discuss integrated education, special education classes as supplementary, teacher training, and equality for vocational education. The United Nations also releases a report by the Special Rapporteur that has a focus on persons with disabilities. In 2015, a report titled "Report of the Special Rapporteur to the 52nd Session of the Commission for Social Development: Note by the Secretary-General on Monitoring of the implementation of the Standard Rules on the Equalization of Opportunities for Persons with Disabilities" was released. This report focused on looking at how the many countries involved, with a focus on Africa, have handled policy regarding persons with disabilities. In this discussion, the author also focuses on the importance of education for persons with disabilities as well as policies that could help improve the education system such as a move towards a more inclusive approach. The World Health Organization has also published a report addressing people with disabilities and within this there is a discussion on education in their "World Report on Disability" in 2011. Other organizations that have issued reports discussing the topic are UNESCO, UNICEF, and the World Bank.

== Floortime ==
Floortime is a relationship-based therapy that has the parent playing with their autistic child so that the child builds developmental, emotional, and communication skills. The parent serves as the child's active play partner and follows the child's lead to encourage engagement between the parent and child.

== Communication interventions ==
The inability to communicate, verbally or nonverbally, is a core deficit in autism. Children with autism are often engaged in repetitive activity or other behaviors because they cannot convey their intent any other way. They do not know how to communicate their ideas to caregivers or others. Helping a child with autism learn to communicate their needs and ideas is absolutely core to any intervention. Communication can either be verbal or nonverbal. Some autistic children benefit from intensive interventions to develop communication skills.

Communication interventions fall into two major categories. First, many autistic children do not speak, or have little speech, or have difficulties in effective use of language. Social skills have been shown to be effective in treating children with autism. Interventions that attempt to improve communication are commonly conducted by speech and language therapists, and work on joint attention, communicative intent, and augmentative and alternative communication (AAC) methods such as visual methods, for example visual schedules. AAC methods do not appear to impede speech and may result in modest gains. A 2006 study reported benefits both for joint attention intervention and for symbolic play intervention, and a 2007 study found that joint attention intervention is more likely than symbolic play intervention to cause children to engage later in shared interactions.

Second, social skills treatment attempts to increase social and communicative skills of autistic individuals, addressing a core deficit of autism. A wide range of intervention approaches is available, including modeling and reinforcement, adult and peer mediation strategies, peer tutoring, social games and stories, self-management, pivotal response therapy, video modeling, direct instruction, visual cuing, Circle of Friends and social-skills groups. A 2007 meta-analysis of 55 studies of school-based social skills intervention found that they were minimally effective for children and adolescents with ASD, and a 2007 review found that social skills training has minimal empirical support for children with Asperger syndrome or high-functioning autism.

== Parent-mediated interventions ==
Parent-mediated interventions offer support and practical advice to parents of autistic children. A 2013 Cochrane Review found that there was no evidence of gains in most of the primary measures of the studies (e.g., the child's adaptive behavior), however there was strong evidence for a positive pattern of change in parent-child interactions. There was some uncertain evidence of changes in the child's language and communication. A very small number of randomized and controlled studies suggest that parent training can lead to reduced maternal depression, improved maternal knowledge of autism and communication style, and improved child communicative behavior, but due to the design and number of studies available, definitive evidence of effectiveness is not available. There is some limited evidence that parental characteristics may impact the effectiveness of parent-mediated interventions. A 2026 review hypothesizes a large number of parental characteristics may impact the effectiveness of parent-mediated interventions, but the impact of many of these are yet to be empirically tested.

Early detection of ASD in children can often occur before a child reaches the age of three years old. Methods that target early behavior can influence the quality of life for a child with ASD. Parents can learn methods of interaction and behavior management to best assist their child's development. A 2013 Cochrance review concluded that there were some improvements when parent intervention was used.

== Medication ==
Many medications are used to treat problems associated with ASD. More than half of U.S. children diagnosed with ASD are prescribed psychoactive drugs or anticonvulsants, with the most common drug classes being antidepressants, stimulants, and antipsychotics.

Research has focused on atypical antipsychotics, especially risperidone, which has the largest amount of evidence that consistently shows improvements in irritability, self-injury, aggression, and tantrums associated with ASD. Risperidone is approved by the Food and Drug Administration (FDA) for treating symptomatic irritability in autistic children and adolescents. In short-term trials (up to six months) most adverse events were mild to moderate, with weight gain, drowsiness, and high blood sugar requiring monitoring; long term efficacy and safety have not been fully determined. It is unclear whether risperidone improves autism's core social and communication deficits. The FDA's decision was based in part on a study of autistic children with severe and enduring problems of tantrums, aggression, and self-injury; risperidone is not recommended for autistic children with mild aggression and explosive behavior without an enduring pattern. Lorazepam (Ativan) is a benzodiazepine sometimes used for Autism Spectrum Disorder (ASD), primarily for catatonia, a serious condition involving motor and behavioral abnormalities that responds well to lorazepam in many cases (a "lorazepam challenge test" can diagnose it). While effective for catatonia and sometimes anxiety/sleep issues, its use in general ASD symptoms is limited due to risks like dependence, paradoxical reactions, and limited evidence for broader symptom relief.

== No intervention perspective ==
Some autism self-advocacy organizations view autism as a different neurology rather than a mental disorder and advocate for acceptance over intervention. However, other advocacy groups, parents, and medical professionals continue to explore treatments aimed at addressing autism-related challenges.

Criticisms of most educational, social, and behavioral focused autism therapies as put forth by autistic adults, teachers, and researchers frequently fall into the idea of these programs encouraging or even training behavioral responses directed toward "camouflaging", "passing as non-autistic", or "masking". Recent studies indicate that, among autistic people, burnout and mental health difficulties associated with masking "driven by the stress of masking and living in an unaccommodating neurotypical world" is an issue (which also impacts autistic young people and children). Animal-assisted therapy used to be directed toward symptoms of autism and some studies of the programs are now directed toward burnout.

In 2018 more studies began involving the experiences of autistic adults including their experiences with general practice medicine. Subsequent related studies have focused on communication preferences of autistic adults and the idea of "the 'Autistic Advantage', a strengths-based model".

== Claims of cure and alternative treatments ==
Early psychiatric and psychoanalytic descriptions of autism, particularly in France, often associated it with psychosis and regarded it as potentially curable. Some authors described childhood autism as a reversible form of “madness." Bruno Bettelheim, for example, advocated for institutional care as a means of curing autism, a view that was later discredited. According to psychoanalysts Patrick Landman and Denys Ribas, most contemporary psychoanalysts no longer assert that psychoanalysis can cure autism. French sociologist Florence Vallade has noted a shift in public discourse, particularly in French media, where the psychoanalytic approach has increasingly been portrayed as ineffective in producing a definitive cure. In contrast, the framing of autism as a permanent disability has gained prominence, emphasizing the potential for re-education rather than cure.

Psychological and behavioral approaches to autism are generally regarded as less invasive than biomedical interventions, whose proponents more commonly frame autism as a condition that may eventually be medically treated or cured. According to the Institut Pasteur (2019), certain symptoms of autism may be reduced, even in adulthood, supporting ongoing clinical trials. The biomedical perspective typically frames autism as a disability or disorder that results in functional impairments and advocates for early detection, prevention strategies, improved treatments, and the potential for a cure. Advocates of this perspective sometimes employ combative language, referring to “fighting” autism or describing it as having “taken children hostage.” Journalist Olivia Cattan has observed that major French media outlets often use terms like “scourge” and “epidemic” when referring to autism.

Florence Vallade argues that sections of the French press have contributed to the perception that autism may be curable. Phrases such as “normal development” and “children no longer distinguishable from other children” are frequently used in media coverage, contributing to a semantic shift that supports the perception of a possible cure.

=== Individuals and groups claiming to cure autism ===
According to Michel Lemay, claims that autism can be cured are generally unsupported scientifically and may constitute forms of quackery. The lack of a recognized curative treatment often leads parents of newly diagnosed autistic children to seek alternative solutions, which can result in the use of unproven and potentially harmful therapies. These unproven treatments are frequently marketed as cures and are primarily associated with the biomedical sector, commonly referred to as "biomed", according to New Scientist.

According to French sociologist Lise Demailly, by the late 2010s in France, two groups involved in the autism field continued to support the idea that autism could be cured in a medical sense. The first group includes proponents of the psychodynamic approach, such as members of the PRÉAUT (Prévention autisme) association, including Marie Allione. Psychoanalyst Marie-Christine Laznik, affiliated with PRÉAUT, claimed to have prevented syndromic autism in infants through psychoanalytically guided interventions. The second group consists of supporters of the infectious disease hypothesis, including figures such as Luc Montagnier, Corinne Skorupka, and Lorène Amet, who assert that treating an underlying infection could cure autism. These claims have been promoted by figures operating outside the scientific community, notably Montagnier, who founded the Chronimed association and was central to the related controversy. Additionally, some hypnotherapists and proponents of special diets offer purported cures for autism. On social media, unverified treatment claims are circulated in discussion groups, often targeting parents of autistic children and autistic adults. These claimed cures are frequently associated with costly treatment protocols.

The AutismOne association previously featured a link on its website to an article asserting that homeopath Kerri Rivera, affiliated with the Genesis II Church of Health and Healing, had cured 38 autistic children in ten months using "miracle mineral supplement", a substance derived from bleach.

In the United States, two organizations have supported efforts to develop a medical treatment for autism: Defeat Autism Now! (DAN) and Cure Autism Now (CAN), the latter of which later merged with Autism Speaks. In China, some medical practitioners advocate for acupuncture as a treatment for autism, though such claims are not supported by the Cochrane Collaboration.

=== Testimonies of “cure” ===
Parents or relatives of autistic individuals have occasionally claimed in the media or published works that their children were "cured" of autism. These testimonies sometimes promote specific methods, such as the Son-Rise program or the 3i method. Canadian author Nathalie Champoux reported having followed biomedical protocols found through online searches, which she credited with her children’s improvement and eventual loss of diagnosis. British journalist Rupert Isaacson claimed in a book and documentary (2007 and 2009) that equine therapy and shamanic practices led to his son's recovery. These accounts are anecdotal and have not been scientifically validated.

American writer Sean Barron has described himself as having recovered from autism, a claim he discusses in his autobiography. He does not attribute this outcome to any specific therapy. Anthropologist Jean-Marie Vidal argued that the term “cure” could be applied to Barron’s developmental trajectory, noting that many who meet him in adulthood find it difficult to believe he once displayed clear autistic traits. Diagnosed with autism at age four and reaffirmed during his childhood and adolescence, Barron later became a journalist, a profession he states requires strong interpersonal skills. He also notes that the social benefits he experiences as an adult outweigh the loss of his childhood abilities, such as an exceptional memory for numbers, dates, and names.

=== Responses to disputed cure claims ===
In March 2019, Amazon removed two English-language books—Healing the Symptoms Known as Autism and Fight Autism and Win—that claimed to offer a cure for autism through invasive unproven treatments. The decision followed pressure from civil society organizations. In France, television presenter Marina Carrère d’Encausse, host of Le Magazine de la santé, stated in 2020 that she does not publicize claims of autism cures to avoid giving them visibility.

== Ethical debates regarding treatment and cure ==
A rainbow-colored infinity symbol symbolizes the autism spectrum and the neurodiversity movement

One of the earliest documented objections to the concept of curing autism was expressed in a 1993 manifesto by autistic activist Jim Sinclair:

When parents say, "I wish my child didn’t have autism," what they’re saying is, "I wish the autistic child I have didn’t exist. I want a different (non-autistic) child instead." That’s what we hear when you mourn over our existence and pray for a cure.

— Jim Sinclair, Don’t Mourn For Us

This position has evolved through activism, particularly in English-speaking countries, where autistic adults have organized events emphasizing the celebration of autistic identity rather than the pursuit of a cure. Psychologist Richard Dean interprets opposition to curing autism as a response to the social exclusion and rejection experienced by many autistic individuals. Some autistic advocates argue that efforts to cure autism, including prenatal interventions, convey that autistic individuals are not accepted as they are. This reflects a broader tension rooted in differing representations of autism and debates over the desirability of a cure. According to Alicia Broderick and Ari Ne’eman, the portrayal of autism as a disease requiring a cure primarily originates from non-autistic individuals.

Disagreements among autistic individuals, parents, and health professionals regarding whether autism should be cured or treated are influenced by differing conceptualizations of autism and by the perspectives of those involved. The experiences of autistic individuals vary, encompassing both those who identify positively with their diagnosis and those who experience significant challenges, including nonspeaking individuals. The debate surrounding the notion of a cure is also closely connected to broader discussions on social inclusion and prevailing societal representations of autism.

=== Ethical questions ===
According to psychologist Simon Baron-Cohen, an ethical debate had begun to emerge by 2009 regarding the use of scientific knowledge about autism for purposes of prevention or cure. Sociologist Nancy Bagatell noted in 2010 that this debate stemmed from opposition by autistic adults to the biomedical interpretation of autism, which they view as a neurological difference rather than a condition requiring treatment.

The possibility of curing autism raises various bioethical issues, including those related to individual freedom, personal identity, resource allocation, culture, and well-being. A 2012 study by R. Eric Barnes and Helen McCabe identified plausible arguments both in favor of and against the pursuit of a cure. Arguments against include the potential loss of abilities associated with autism and the risk of marginalization of individuals who do not undergo treatment or whose parents decline prenatal screening. Arguments in favor include the potential for improved quality of life and respect for individual autonomy.

==== Individual freedom ====
While individuals may ethically choose to decline treatment for autism, the question of halting all research aimed at developing a cure raises more complex ethical considerations. A comparable debate exists within the Deaf culture movement regarding the use of cochlear implants. As summarized by Barnes and McCabe, supporters of a cure for autism argue for the availability of treatments that could significantly reduce or potentially eliminate the prevalence of autism. In contrast, opponents of such treatments argue against offering individuals the option to live without autism, emphasizing the preservation of neurodiversity and identity.

Some individuals diagnosed with autism are under legal guardianship or custodianship, meaning decisions regarding medical treatment, including the possibility of a cure, may be made on their behalf by a designated guardian.

==== Identity and diversity ====
Autistic adults who oppose efforts to cure autism often emphasize that they experience autism as an integral part of their identity, rather than as a condition they possess. From this perspective, the removal of autism would alter their fundamental sense of self. Some critics of curative approaches have described the concept of curing autism as a form of “identity erasure." Psychologist Simon Baron-Cohen has noted that autistic individuals tend to make life choices that differ from those of non-autistic individuals and argues that these differences should be respected, along with their integrity.

Barnbaum, Barnes, and McCabe argued that there is insufficient evidence to conclude that a hypothetical cure for autism would fundamentally alter an adult's personality, memories, preferences, or desires. Barnes and McCabe further argue that claims of identity loss would require substantial neurological changes resulting from treatment.

The argument based on genetic diversity is also discussed in the context of autism, but is considered insufficient for determining whether curing autism would be beneficial or detrimental. While genetic diversity may have advantages or disadvantages, it does not directly address the ethical implications of curing autism. Similarly, debates regarding the impact of an autistic child on other family members do not resolve the core question of whether curing autism is desirable.

==== Allocation of resources ====
According to Australian sociologist Matthew Bennett and his research team, the belief that autism can be cured—a notion rooted in the medical model of disability—can have detrimental effects on the lives of autistic individuals. They argue that substantial investments in the search for hypothetical cures divert resources from areas such as education and employment support, thereby limiting opportunities for autistic individuals in areas such as education and employment. R. Eric Barnes and Helen McCabe note that if a treatment for autism were to become widely available, the resulting decline in the autistic population could lead to a corresponding reduction in services and accommodations designed to support them. While this outcome is not certain, it suggests that the introduction of a treatment could potentially worsen the living conditions of autistic individuals who remain. This concern must be balanced against the possible improvements in quality of life for those who might benefit from such treatment.

==== Autistic culture ====
Some autistic advocates and scholars describe the existence of an autistic culture, which some believe could be threatened by the possibility of curing autism. According to Barnes and McCabe, the concept of autistic culture remains debated, particularly when compared to Deaf culture, which is closely linked to the transmission of sign language. In contrast, autistic culture has been described as being based largely on shared experiences rather than on a distinct language tradition. The question of preserving this culture raises broader ethical considerations about the relative importance of cultural identity and individual well-being.

==== Well-being ====
A final ethical consideration concerns whether the existence of a cure—and the potential elimination of autism—would lead to an overall improvement in the lives of autistic individuals. Some report that autism is associated with specific abilities, particularly in areas such as mathematics and music. According to Barnes and McCabe, approximately 10% of autistic individuals believe they could be worse off following a treatment that removed these characteristics. While some autistic individuals exhibit exceptional skills, the extent to which these abilities are directly attributable to autism remains unclear. If such competencies are intrinsically linked to the condition, the ethical justification for curing autism becomes more complex.

Proponents of a cure for autism, typically individuals who are not autistic, argue that the potential benefits of eliminating autism outweigh the potential disadvantages. They assert that autistic individuals often experience reduced empathy, lower quality of life compared to non-autistic individuals, and that autism may negatively impact the quality of life of those around them. In this context, Deborah R. Barnbaum considers prenatal screening technologies for autism to be ethically justifiable.

Barnbaum also contends (2008) that a cure would require significant psychological and social adaptation for autistic adults, potentially limiting its benefits for this group. In contrast, Barnes and McCabe argue that there is no conclusive evidence that such adaptation challenges would make a cure undesirable for all autistic adults. They suggest that the capacity to adapt may vary according to age and individual circumstances.

The availability of a treatment for autism could lead to forms of coercion, where autistic individuals may be pressured to undergo treatment despite personal objections. Such a development could intensify social rejection of those who choose not to be treated, potentially reinforcing reluctance among non-autistic individuals to accept neurodiversity. Moreover, individuals who decline treatment may be perceived as responsible for the continued financial burden on public systems. This perception raises ethical concerns, as societies are generally considered to have a moral obligation to support individuals who have not chosen their condition, but may view differently those who are seen as voluntarily rejecting available remedies.

=== Activism against the cure for autism ===
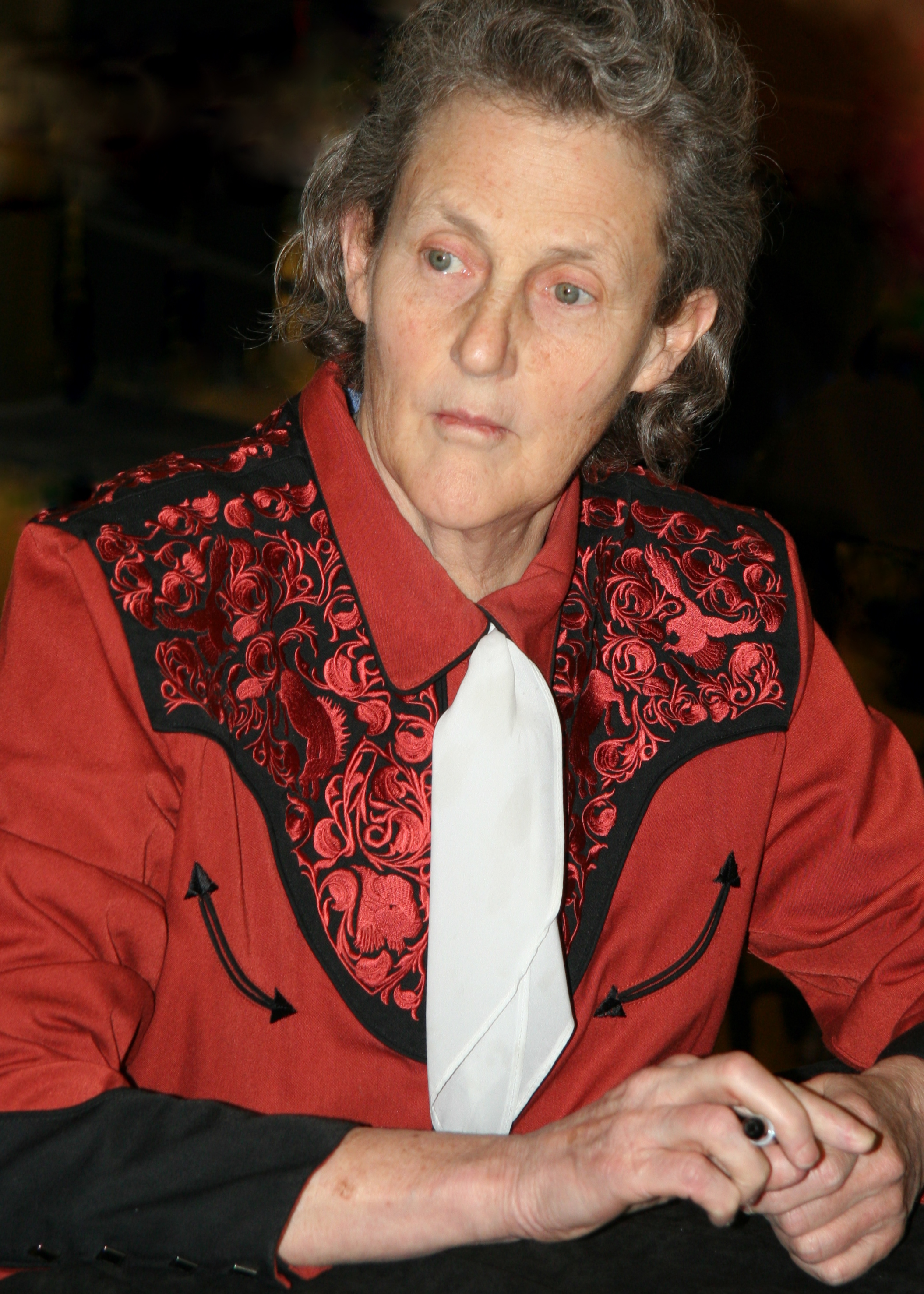
Temple Grandin is a notable figure who opposes curing autism

The position opposing efforts to cure autism is widely held among autistic adults and aligns with the principles of the neurodiversity movement, which advocates for the recognition and acceptance of neurological differences. This stance is also connected to broader calls for the demedicalization of disability. Prominent figures such as Australian artist Donna Williams and American animal science expert Temple Grandin have publicly expressed opposition to the idea that curing autism is a desirable objective. During a conference in the 1990s, Grandin addressed neurologist Oliver Sacks to convey her position:

If I could snap my fingers and not be autistic, I wouldn’t. Because I wouldn’t be me. My autism is an integral part of who I am.

— Temple Grandin, Thinking in Pictures

These activists acknowledge that individuals with severe autism-related disabilities require support, including from peers, to achieve greater autonomy. French author Hugo Horiot, sometimes described in the media as having "recovered from autism", addresses such claims in his book Autisme: j’accuse!, where he criticizes attempts to "cure" autism. French activists Julie Dachez and Josef Schovanec, along with British-born writer Daniel Tammet, also oppose the idea of curing autism. However, at least one autistic adult, American Jonathan Mitchell, advocates for a cure, indicating that the anti-cure position, though widespread, is not universally held among autistic individuals.

Studies cited by some scholars suggest that many non-autistic parents of autistic children oppose stigmatizing rhetoric while remaining supportive of the development of treatments or cures. The anti-cure perspective is less common among this group, though some parents express support for the neurodiversity framework. For example, Olivia Cattan, in Le Livre noir de l’autisme, dedicates the book to her son and states that autism is not a disease from which he should be cured.

Among healthcare professionals, Laurent Mottron and Simon Baron-Cohen emphasize the potential strengths associated with autism and oppose efforts aimed at curing it. In The Lancet, Baron-Cohen notes that while certain co-occurring conditions—such as language delays, intellectual disability, epilepsy, gastrointestinal issues, and social challenges—might benefit from treatment, this does not imply that autism itself should be cured.

== See also ==
- Autistic rights movement
- Autism friendly
- Equine-assisted therapy on autistic people
- List of investigational autism and pervasive developmental disorder drugs
- Ryan's Law
- Special education

== Bibliography ==
- Bagatell, Nancy (2010). "From Cure to Community: Transforming Notions of Autism". Ethos. 38 (1): 33–55. doi:10.1111/j.1548-1352.2009.01080.x. ISSN 1548-1352.
- Barnbaum, Deborah (2008). The ethics of autism : among them, but not of them. Indiana University Press. ISBN 978-0-253-22013-4. OCLC 560616889.
- Barnes, R; McCabe, Helen (2012). "Should we welcome a cure for autism? A survey of the arguments". Medicine, Health Care and Philosophy. 15 (3): 255–269. doi:10.1007/s11019-011-9339-7. ISSN 1572-8633. PMID 21837546.
- Baron-Cohen, Simon (2009). "Does autism need a cure?". The Lancet. 373 (9675): 1595–1596. doi:10.1016/s0140-6736(09)60891-6. ISSN 0140-6736.
- Cattan, Olivia (2020). Le Livre noir de l'autisme [The Black Book of Autism] (in French). Le Cherche midi. ISBN 978-2-7491-6390-1.
- Dean, Richard (2018). "Neurodiversity and the rejection of Cures". Disability in Practice: Attitudes, Policies, and Relationships. Oxford University Press. ISBN 978-0-19-254217-5.
- Frith, Uta (2010). L'Énigme de l'autisme [The Enigma of Autism] (in French). Odile Jacob. ISBN 978-2-7381-9257-8.
- Helt, Molly; Kelley, Elizabeth; Kinsbourne, Marcel; Pandey, Juhi (2008). "Can Children with Autism Recover? If So, How?". Neuropsychology Review. 18 (4): 339–366. doi:10.1007/s11065-008-9075-9. ISSN 1040-7308. PMID 19009353.
- Shute, Nancy (2010). "Desperate for an Autism Cure". Scientific American. 303 (4): 80–85. Bibcode:2010SciAm.303d..80S. doi:10.1038/scientificamerican1010-80. ISSN 0036-8733. JSTOR 26002217. PMID 20923134.
