= Success on the Spectrum =

American autism treatment franchise

Success on the Spectrum (SOS) is an American autism treatment franchise based in Houston, Texas. The franchise network is known for having multiple centers that provide services for children with autism, including applied behavior analysis (ABA) therapy, speech therapy, occupational therapy and related services.

== History ==
Success on the Spectrum was established by Nichole Daher in 2015 after experiencing difficulties finding suitable autism treatment for her stepdaughter. The initial clinic that she started reached maximum capacity, and hence a second clinic was opened in Houston in 2018. That same year, she developed the franchise model to expand the network beyond its original Houston base.

In a 2024 interview with 1851 Franchise, Daher discussed her experience establishing the franchise and her approach to supporting franchise owners, particularly women entering the franchising industry.

== Franchise model ==
The SOS network operates through a franchise system. It combines local franchise ownership with a centralized training system and family involvement. In 2024, the company sold 71 franchise territories. The network requires franchise owners to be involved in the daily operation of their centres and participate in community outreach activities.

The SOS network provides applied behavior analysis therapy for children living with autism. Each SOS location offers ABA therapy, speech therapy and occupational therapy.

== Community activities ==
The SOS network has been associated with community outreach events geared towards helping children with autism and their families. In 2021, the network organized a free sensory event in Houston during Autism Awareness Month. In 2022, Success On The Spectrum and Jim McIngvale hosted an Autism Prom.

In 2023, it also organized an Autism Play Day event at one of its centers located in American Fork, Utah. The event provided an inclusive setting for children living with autism and their families.

== See also ==
- Applied behavior analysis
- Autism
- Management of autism
- Occupational therapy
