= Equine-assisted therapy on autistic people =

Animal-assisted therapy for autistic people

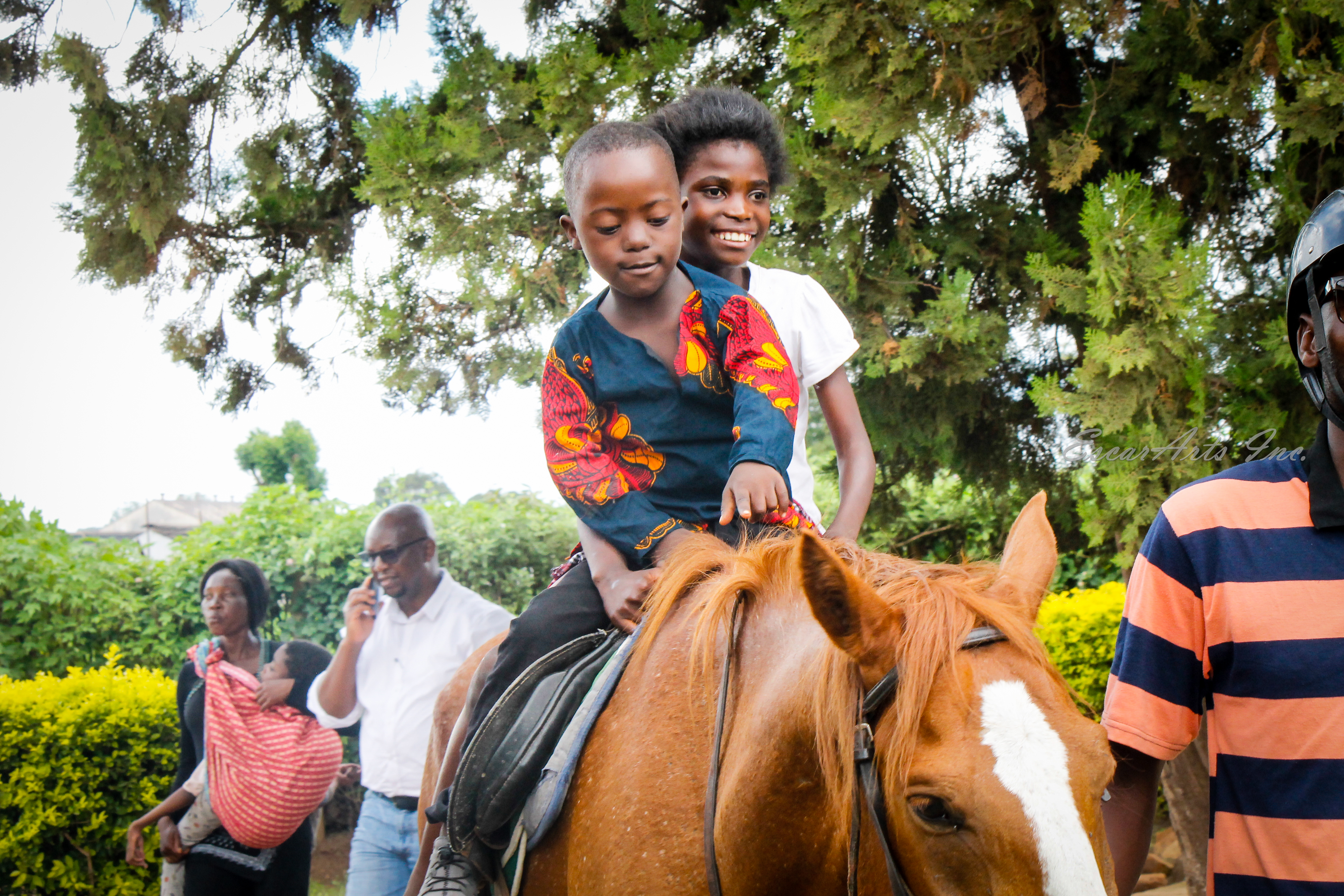
Children on horseback at the Kabwe Center for Autistic Children (Zambia)

Equine-assisted therapy on autistic people is an autism therapy that uses a mediating horse or pony. A session can take place on foot or on horseback. Equine-assisted therapy is one of the few animal-assisted therapies regularly studied for its effectiveness, and the most popular of all autism therapies.

Equine-assisted therapy was popularized by the 2009 book and film The Horse Boy, which documents the progress of author Rupert Isaacson's autistic son during a trip to Mongolia. Previously, the effects of contact with horses on autistic people was limited to testimonials, such as that of Temple Grandin in her 1996 autobiography Emergence: Labeled Autistic. Since 2005, various studies have examined the effectiveness of this therapy, which was upgraded from "controversial" to "promising" status in 2007.

Equine-assisted therapy offers clinically significant reductions in disability in the areas of communication, perception, attention and emotional regulation. It increases volition, reduces hyperactivity and improves sensory integration in autistic people. In 2016, the scientific community agreed that it was the most effective animal-assisted therapy available to autistic people. However, it is only targeted to specific needs and does not benefit all autistic people. Furthermore, the sessions are relatively expensive, and require considerable human resources.

== Definition ==
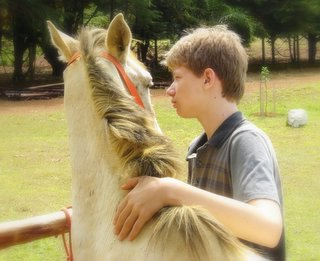
Regulation of emotional disorders

The horse is the pioneering animal in animal-assisted therapy, and by far the most widely used in this type of therapy. At the same time, equine-assisted therapy is the most popular animal-assisted therapy for autism.

This therapy is described and conceived as a form of care, and not as a leisure activity or horseback-riding lessons adapted to autistic people. Its aim is to provide therapeutic assistance. The horse becomes a mediator between the autistic person and the therapist. Ideally, an equine-assisted therapy session should be led by one or more trained therapists, with both solid equestrian skills and experience in supporting disabled people.

=== Therapeutic areas concerned ===
Equine-assisted therapy acts on the neuromuscular, relational, perceptive, attentional and emotional levels. The horse stimulates various areas: communication (laughter, speech, etc.), relationships with others, motor behavior, attention, action planning, body awareness, self-confidence, relaxation, emotional regulation and sharing of emotions. The relationship with the horse is highly "sensorial", charged with scents, contact and a variety of sensations, making the equine-assisted therapy session a multi-sensory experience. The kinesthetic stimulation offered by the horse is unique among the animal therapies available to autistic people, since the horse (or pony) is the only mediating animal that can offer it.

=== Relationship between horses and autistic people ===
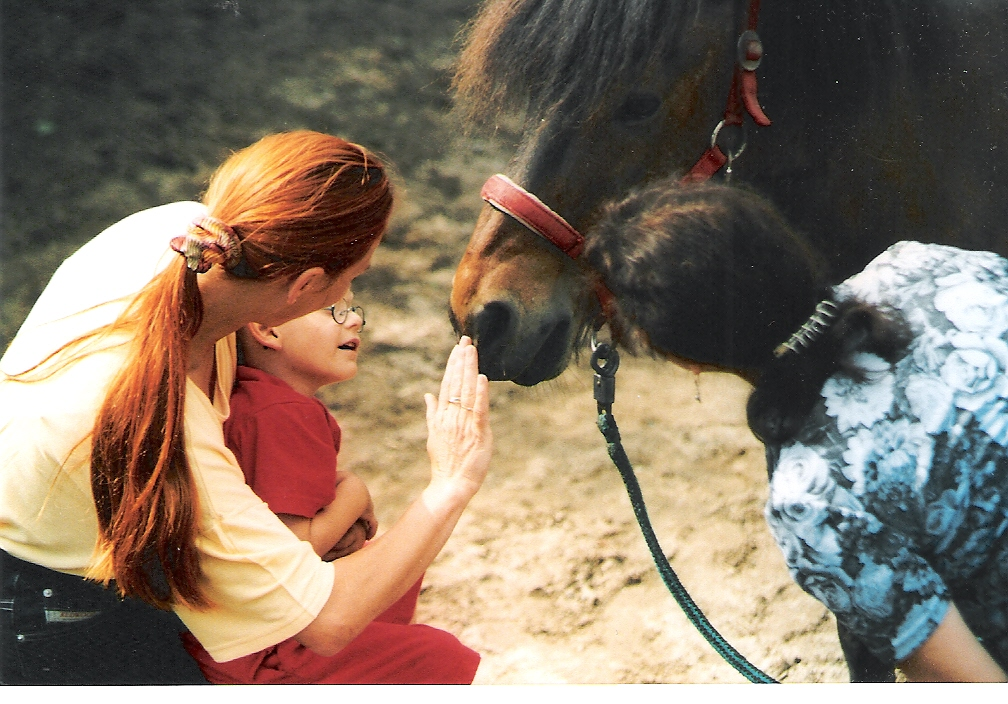
Contact between a child and a horse

French equine expert Isabelle Claude believes that the behavior of autistic people is close in some respects to that of the horse, notably in terms of sensory perception, tactile sensitivity, olfactory need and attention to details and micro-signals. She adds that, like the horse, the autistic person is accustomed to expressing their emotional states, particularly their anger. The ASBL Anthe-Anthesis (Belgian national association for therapy with horses) also likens the perception of autistic people to that of horses, in that both are situated in "the world of feeling".

Grandin, an autistic American university professor, likens the behavior of an autistic child to that of a wild horse in the process of being tamed: the reaction to touch and the way in which they are approached are, in her view, very similar. Furthermore, in her book Animals in Translation, she compares the mode of consciousness and thought of animals to that of a so-called "learned" autistic person, asserting that spoken language is not necessary for thought, and that horses, among other animals, use a visual thinking similar to that of certain autistic people.

In her psychology thesis (Université Rennes-II, 2010), Marine Grandgeorge notes that autistic children are generally more spontaneously interested in images of animals, including horses, than in images of objects.

== History ==
Since the end of the 20th century, there have been consistent but isolated accounts of the benefits that autistic people derive from contact with horses. Grandin testifies to having spent a great deal of time observing horses and cows since childhood. She started riding in the 1960s, realizing that these large animals are often mistreated out of ignorance. Riding and contact with horses calmed her anxieties and hyperactivity, and she testifies that galloping calms her. In France, several therapists work with autistic children using horses or ponies as mediators, including Claude since the 1980s in Lorraine, Claudine Pelletier-Milet at her riding hall in La Chapelle-Montligeon since 1999, and Isabelle Chaveneau in Sevrey. In 1989, D. Athy described the case of a horse that had been retired from racing and taken in by a home for autistic children. By caring for and riding the animal, the children's symptoms diminished. At the same time, the horse regained its performance and began racing again, its winnings being used to finance the center, in particular the purchase of other therapy horses for autistic children.

American Hana May Brown published a testimonial about a non-speaking autistic child at her therapeutic riding center in Houston, who began to speak and made such progress that schooling became possible. Concordant testimonials led her to officially present horseback riding as a valid therapeutic option for autistic children in 1994. In 1995–1996, Charlotte Daubrée observed five autistic children as part of her veterinary doctorate thesis in Clermont-Ferrand. This work enabled her to observe real progress, but the numbers involved were far too small to draw any conclusions.

=== Impact of The Horse Boy ===
In 2009, the autobiographical book and documentary The Horse Boy were released by British journalist Rupert Isaacson. In it, he described how contact with a neighbor's horse resulted in significant benefits to his autistic son, Rowan. This led him and his wife Kristin Neff to take Rowan on a trip to Mongolia, in hopes of further improvement. During the trip, they were able to establish communication with Rowan, who had been nonverbal, through horses, travel and shamanism. Since then, he has said, Rowan no longer "suffers from the dysfunctions associated with his disorder". As of 2022, Rowan is functional and living independently.

It is a "convincing plea for equine-assisted therapy", and motivates parents to try this therapy. Isaacson does not use the word "cure," but speaks of recovery and healing. Press coverage of the book and film raised the question of whether the company of a horse could help all autistic children. Since then, Isaacson has developed a method of helping autistic children through contact with horses, in Texas.

"Several children have made capital progress during their passage, some even pronouncing their first words on horseback, to the amazement of their parents."

Contemporaneously commenting on The Horse Boy, pediatrician Paul A. Offit warned of the lack of studies on the effectiveness of contact with horses, and the temptation to spend large sums on ineffective, poorly supervised therapies.

=== First scientific evaluations ===
In 2005, there was no scientific literature on this therapy, which meant that the scientific community was unable to comment on its effectiveness. In 2008, pediatrician Lisa A. Kurtz listed equine-assisted therapy as one of the "controversial" therapies, noting that some publications supported its efficacy as a complementary therapy. Similarly, in her thesis published in 2008, French veterinary surgeon Laurence Duval-Desnoes stated, "[T]here is very little truly scientific evidence today to show the beneficial effects that an autistic person can derive from contact with an animal. It's more often a question of observations, of isolated facts".

The first scientific assessments of this therapy were published in 2008 and 2009. According to an article published in The Guardian in February 2012, a growing number of health professionals were recognizing the effectiveness of equine-assisted therapy in helping autistic people. According to French child psychiatrist Dr Laurence Hameury, of the CHRU (Centre hospitalier régional universitaire by its extension in French) de Tours (2017), "therapies including animal mediation are currently in full development, and their benefits are recognized and validated by scientific studies evaluating the results".

== Accessibility and practices ==
In 2018, an Indian woman came to France for training to develop equine-assisted therapy with the autistic public in India.

In 2012, according to the French recommendations of the Haute Autorité de santé and the Agence nationale de l'évaluation et de la qualité des établissements et services sociaux et médico-sociaux (French national agency for the evaluation and quality of social and medico-social establishments and services) "activities carried out with animals cannot be considered, in the current state of knowledge, as therapeutic, but constitute practices that can participate in the personal and social development of certain children/adolescents with [autism spectrum disorder], according to their centers of interest, if they benefit from specific support".

== Procedure ==
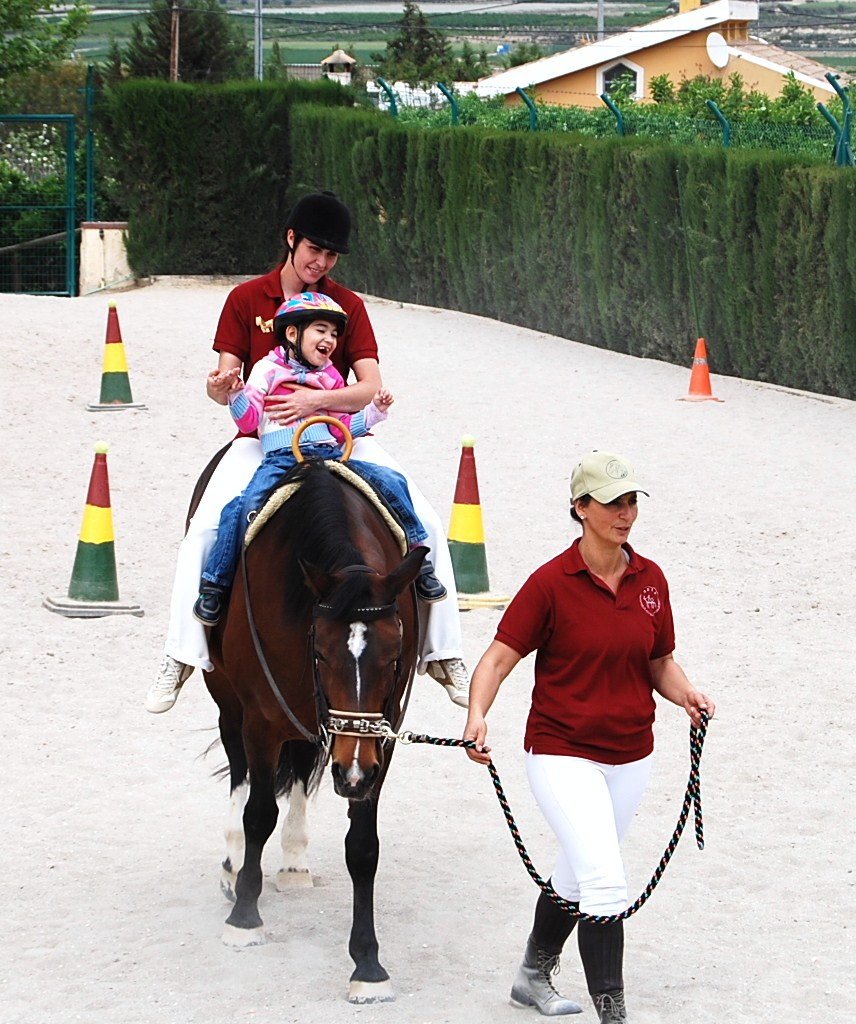
Interaction with the horse during a mounted equine-assisted therapy session

An equine-assisted therapy session can involve a variety of disorders or disabilities. There are also sessions entirely adapted to the specific needs of autistic people. Claudine Pelletier-Milet finds that children's sessions with ponies take place in a joyful, relaxed atmosphere. These sessions can take place on foot or on horseback. The notion of equine-assisted therapy covers both types of therapy. Many autistic people are able to develop quite advanced riding skills during their sessions, so that the latter are often more akin to conventional riding lessons than therapeutic care. A session is also an opportunity to share knowledge about the horse.

According to Claude, the sessions most often involve "deficit" autistic children (non-speaking or with numerous behavioral disorders), due to the high demand from families and health professionals, and much more rarely "Asperger's" autistic people. American Linda Kohanov has used an "emotional message interpretation grid" when working with "Asperger's" adults. Pelletier-Milet encourages her patients to anchor themselves in the present moment, and to transcribe the emotions they feel into words.

=== Walking sessions ===
Equine-assisted therapy sessions usually begin on foot, away from the animal. The autistic person then creates an emotional bridge with the animal by grooming and touching it. Sessions on foot are used to work on cognition, attention and social skills. Sandrine Willems recounts having witnessed a case where an autistic child unable to wash himself learned to do so, presumably by grooming his horse during the on-foot equine-assisted therapy sessions.

=== Mounted sessions ===
During mounted sessions, the horse's movement is used to work on mobility. They can involve the therapist and up to three other people for individual therapy: one person to guide the horse, the therapist to move the rider and give instructions, and two people on the horse's sides to prevent falls resulting from loss of balance.

== Advantages and disadvantages ==
Animal-assisted therapy involves an animal that already shares a long history with human beings. Psycho-pedagogue Jean-Pierre Juhel recommends horses for all autistic people. While autistic children have difficult contact with peers and adults, they readily accept and seek contact with horses. The autistic person generally testifies to feeling a profound sense of well-being during these sessions. According to Amélie Tsaag Valren, the therapeutic setting is not compulsory to feel the benefits of horses. Tactile contact with these animals (or even their simple observation) can be enough to remedy the anxiety that autistic people often experience. On the other hand, France's EgaliTED collective is hostile to this therapy, which it classifies as "psychic care", calling it "a pony pompously renamed 'equine-assisted therapy'".

=== Advantages ===
According to Merope Pavlides, among autism interventions, equine-assisted therapy has many advantages and few disadvantages. The effectiveness of contact with the horse depends largely on its non-judgmental nature. The horse's presence creates a feeling of trust, whereas human relationships create stress, for fear of being judged. Pelletier-Milet believes that the horse's effectiveness as a therapeutic partner stems largely from the fact that it does not talk, is non-judgmental, non-intrusive or demanding: she describes it as a "simple, honest and consistent" animal. In their book on behavioral approaches to autism, applied behavior analysts Ron Leaf, John McEachin and Mitchell Taubman believe that "making contact with a massive animal, such as a horse, and maneuvering it successfully, brings a sense of self-actualization for the individual", although they add that there is a lack of data to back this up. The herd behavior of the horse means that these animals have a natural tendency to follow each other, which avoids having to hold them all the time. Grandin focuses on the horse's movements, which create an imbalance that the autistic person has to compensate for, leading to work on body posture.

Laurence Duval-Desnoes points out that the size of the horse "makes it possible to work with subjects whose reactions are unpredictable, who may become violent and strike the animal; indeed, it is rare for a child or even an adult to hurt a horse with their bare hands", all the more so as the animals chosen for therapy are generally chosen for their calm temperament. She adds that the position of the horse's eyes, far apart from each other, can be reassuring for autistic people, who don't like to be approached and looked at head-on. The Belgian association Anthesis emphasizes the horse's ability to decipher body language, and its sensitivity to voice intonation. This constitutes "an important therapeutic potential for work with autistic children".

=== Limits and disadvantages ===
Contact with horses does have its limits. Grandin admits "painfully" that observing and then understanding how animals feel has not helped her to better understand human relationships. What's more, the attention to detail shown by some autistic people can lead to anger and even regression if a change is made in the course of the equine-assisted therapy session. Another difficulty lies in the cost of this therapy, which is one of the most expensive among the therapies offered to autistic people. In the United States, the cost is annually around $5,000 per person.

The very large size of a horse can cause anxiety for the person, "as soon as you have to approach it or ride on it". There is a risk of knocks, falls or wound infection when working with the animal, as well as a risk of allergy (frequent) or zoonosis (very few cases reported). In a few cases, the presence of the animal can generate human behavioral disorders: phobia, "excessive attachment", vulnerability to the animal's death. The horse itself may experience stress due to the behavioral inconsistencies of the person being cared for, or even be the victim of abuse.

In France, this practice is not regulated, the only registered profession being that of equine technician, and this can lead to abuse.

== Scientific evaluations of effectiveness ==
Standardized scientific evaluation of equine-assisted therapy applied to autism is hampered by the heterogeneity of autism spectrum disorder, and the impossibility of evaluating sufficiently large samples due to material constraints. In addition, the studies carried out present methodological weaknesses. On the scale of scientific validation of complementary therapies for autism established by Gardner T. Umbarger in 2007, distinguishing between recommended, promising, emerging and non-recommended therapies, equine-assisted therapy is considered "promising", meaning that at least 4 studies of acceptable quality and 2 of high quality are evaluating its results. A 2012 review of scientific literature related to pet therapy for autistic people concluded that the results were unanimously positive, despite the studies' weaknesses, highlighting the need to pursue this research more rigorously.

The first evaluations were carried out on a wide range of disabled children. It wasn't until 2008 that the American Alexandra Dingman published the first study devoted to the specific case of autistic children brought into contact with horses. In 2009, 19 autistic children and 15 control children were followed for 12 weeks. The conclusion was that "autistic children exposed to equine-assisted therapy showed greater sensory seeking, sensory sensitivity, social motivation, and less inattention, distraction, and sedentary behaviors". Research carried out on 16 children aged 2 to 14 receiving one session of horse therapy per week for 10 weeks, in Texas, led to "significant improvement" and the same conclusion, in 2010. A study published the same year involved 60 children followed for 20 weeks. They showed improved motor control and sensory integration.

In 2011, a study was published involving 24 autistic children. It concluded that these "results suggest that children with [autism spectrum disorder] benefit from assisted equestrian activities". In 2012, a preliminary study looked at 42 autistic participants, aged 6 to 16, during their 10 weekly lessons, along with 16 controls. They showed "significant improvements on measures of irritability, lethargy, stereotyped behaviors, hyperactivity, expressive language skills, motor skills, and motor and verbal planning skills", as well as "significant improvements in self-regulatory behaviors". The study suggests that these improvements are linked to equine-assisted therapy, and that the movement created by the animal leads to a positive effect on motor skills. In 2013, the American Occupational Therapy Association studied six autistic children, aged 5 to 12, during 12 horse therapy sessions of 45 minutes each. It concludes that equine-assisted therapy has a positive influence on autistic children, and can be a useful therapeutic tool for this population. Postural sway decreased significantly post-therapy. Significant improvements were also observed in global adaptive behaviors, leisure demand and social interactions.

Research conducted at the University of Washington in 2014 also concludes that equine-assisted therapy "can significantly improve balance, social responsiveness and other life events". To address the lack of comparative studies, 13 autistic children participated in 9 weeks of equine-assisted therapy, and were compared to 12 children cared for by non-equine social programs. Parents noted significant physical, emotional and social improvement in their child after the first 6 weeks, superior to that of children participating in the non-equine program.

A study of six children in Joué-lès-Tours, France, found "clear improvement from the very first session" in communication, development, and motor, emotional and perceptual regulation. The children seemed calmed, became aware of the effect of their actions on the pony, and sought interaction. A 16-week program investigated the willingness of three autistic children, revealing an increase in willingness over time. This preliminary evidence shows that "improved willpower may be an important and underestimated benefit of equine-assisted therapy for children with autism". The potential of horse therapy for women may also be underestimated, as many autistic girls and women have horses as a special area of interest, but are deterred from riding in a riding hall because of social relationships with other girls or teenagers.

In 2016, according to a review of the available scientific literature, there is a consensus that equine-assisted therapy is the most useful animal therapy for autistic people.

Equine-assisted therapy may not be effective for all autistic people. In a study of four children in Bosnia-Herzegovina, only two experienced positive effects. Similarly, in the areas of fine motor skills, social cognition and social awareness, research has, as of 2011, shown no significant results.

== Bibliography ==
- Aldridge, Roy Lee (2012). The Effects of Hippotherapy on Motor Performance in an Individual with Autism. Arkansas State University.
- Beiger, François; Jean, Aurélie (2011). Autisme et zoothérapie : Communication et apprentissages par la médiation animale. Santé Social (in French). Dunod. ISBN 978-2-10-056561-0.
- Caillerec-Chassé, Claire; Vidament, Marianne (2018). La médiation équine : qu'en pensent les scientifiques? (in French). Institut français du cheval et de l'équitation. ISBN 978-2-915250-63-3. OCLC 1079984845.
- Claude, Isabelle (2015). Le cheval médiateur (in French). Éditions Belin. ISBN 978-2-7011-9389-2.
- Duval-Desnoes, Françoise (2008). L'Animal peut-il aider l'individu autiste ? État des lieux de l'intervention animale dans la prise en charge de l'autisme en France (in French). Thèse de doctorat vétérinaire – École nationale vétérinaire d'Alfort. S2CID 160585969.
- Grandgeorge, Marine (2010). Le lien à l'animal permet-il une récupération sociale et cognitive chez l'enfant avec autisme ? (phdthesis) (in French). Thèse de psychologie. Université Rennes 2.
- Hameury, Laurence (2017). L'enfant autiste en thérapie avec le cheval : Un soin complémentaire validé par la recherche (in French). Saint-Denis: Connaissances et Savoirs – Publibook. ISBN 978-2-7539-0457-6.
- Juhel, Jean-Charles; Hérault, Guy (2003). "L'équithérapie". La personne autiste et le syndrome d'Asperger (in French). Presses Université Laval. ISBN 9782763779225.
- Martin, Brigitte (2007). Une pratique de la thérapie avec le cheval auprès d'enfants autistes : une aventure à cheval sur les chemins de l'individuation (in French). UFR de médecine Pierre et Marie Curie.
- Pavlides, Merope (2008). "Therapeutic riding". Animal-assisted Interventions for Individuals with Autism. Jessica Kingsley Publishers. ISBN 9781846427954.
- Pelletier-Milet, Claudine (2010). Poneys et chevaux au secours de l'autisme. Pédagogie (in French). Paris: Belin. ISBN 978-2-7011-5271-4.
- Pelletier-Milet, Claudine (2012). Riding on the Autism Spectrum : How Horses Open New Doors for Children with ASD : One Teacher's Experiences Using EAAT to Instill Confidence and Promote Independence. Trafalgar Square Books. ISBN 978-1-57076-574-2.
- Philippe, Claire (2014). Intervention de l'animal dans le cadre de la prise en charge des enfants avec TED par les structures médico-sociales en France métropolitaine : état des lieux et propositions (in French). Ecole Nationale Vétérinaire de Toulouse – ENVT.
- Anderson, Sophie; Meints, Kerstin (2016). "Brief Report: The Effects of Equine-Assisted Activities on the Social Functioning in Children and Adolescents with Autism Spectrum Disorder". Journal of Autism and Developmental Disorders. 46 (10): 3344–3352. doi:10.1007/s10803-016-2869-3. ISSN 0162-3257. PMC 5040734. PMID 27457363. S2CID 254568210.
- Bass, Margaret M.; Duchowny, Catherine A.; Llabre, Maria M. (2009). "The effect of therapeutic horseback riding on social functioning in children with autism". Journal of Autism and Developmental Disorders. 39 (9): 1261–1267. doi:10.1007/s10803-009-0734-3. ISSN 1573-3432. PMID 19350376. S2CID 612123.
- Borgi, Marta; Loliva, Dafne; Cerino, Stefania; Chiarotti, Flavia (2016). "Effectiveness of a Standardized Equine-Assisted Therapy Program for Children with Autism Spectrum Disorder". Journal of Autism and Developmental Disorders. 46 (1): 1–9. doi:10.1007/s10803-015-2530-6. ISSN 0162-3257. PMID 26210515. S2CID 254566648.
- Gabriels, Robin L.; Agnew, John A.; Holt, Katherine D.; Shoffner, Amy (2012). "Pilot study measuring the effects of therapeutic horseback riding on school-age children and adolescents with autism spectrum disorders". Research in Autism Spectrum Disorders. 6 (2): 578–588. doi:10.1016/j.rasd.2011.09.007.
- Hameury, L.; Delavous, P.; Teste, B.; Leroy, C.; Gaboriau, J.-C. (2010). "Équithérapie et autisme". Annales Médico-Psychologiques, Revue Psychiatrique (in French). 168 (9): 655–659. doi:10.1016/j.amp.2009.12.019.
- Lanning, Beth A.; Matyastik Baier, E.; Ivey-Hatz, Julie; Krenek, Nancy; Tubbs, Jack D. (2014). "Effects of Equine Assisted Activities on Autism Spectrum Disorder". Journal of Autism and Developmental Disorders. 44 (8): 1897–1907. doi:10.1007/s10803-014-2062-5. ISSN 0162-3257. PMID 24526337. S2CID 254570377.
- Lorin de Reure, A. (2009). "Enfants autistes en thérapie avec le poney : échelles d'évaluation et approches clinique et éthologique concernant les domaines relationnels, émotionnels et la communication". Neuropsychiatrie de l'enfance et de l'adolescence (in French). ISSN 0222-9617.
- O'Haire, Marguerite E. (2012). "Animal-Assisted Intervention for Autism Spectrum Disorder: A Systematic Literature Review". Journal of Autism and Developmental Disorders. 43 (7): 1606–1622. doi:10.1007/s10803-012-1707-5. ISSN 0162-3257. PMID 23124442. S2CID 254571095.
- Brown, Hana May (1996). "Intrusion" and Interaction Therapy for Riders with Autism. Vol. 2. NARHA Strides magazine.
- Isaacson, Rupert (2011). L'enfant cheval : La quête d'un père aux confins du monde pour guérir son fils autiste (in French). Translated by Ménévis, Esther. J'ai lu. ISBN 978-2-290-02899-5.
