= Across the Line: The Exodus of Charlie Wright =

- Directed by: R. Ellis Frazier
- Written by: R. Ellis Frazier
- Produced by: Jacov Bresler; Geoffrey Ross
- Starring: Aidan Quinn; Mario Van Peebles; Luke Goss; Danny Pino; Gina Gershon; Andy Garcia
- Cinematography: Anthony J. Rickert-Epstein
- Edited by: Mike Wech
- Music by: Kim Carroll
- Distributed by: IFA Distribution
- Release date: December 7, 2010
- Country: United States
- Language: English

Across the Line: The Exodus of Charlie Wright is a 2010 crime thriller film directed by R. Ellis Frazier and starring Aidan Quinn. Filming took place in Los Angeles, California and Tijuana, Mexico. The film follows a banker (Quinn) who escapes the U.S. with billions after he is revealed to be a fraud, as well as the authorities and mercenaries tracking him down.

== Plot ==
Charlie Wright's (Aidan Quinn) business empire is revealed to be a Ponzi scheme, having taken as much as eleven billion from his clients. Leaving his office after hearing about his punishment, Wright is intercepted by FBI Agent Hobbs (Mario Van Peebles), who is unable to arrest Wright as at the moment there is not a warrant. Stalling time, Hobbs gets his warrant and Hobbs' partner Jimmy (Jordan Belfi) intercepts Wright as he pulls out of the office garage. Looking inside the car, Hobbs is dismayed to find that Wright is gone. The ensuing investigation leaves few clues as to where Wright fled.

As it turns out, Charlie fled to Tijuana, Mexico, looking for a woman he abandoned two decades ago. From Mary (Claudia Ferri) he learns that the woman died years ago, but she had a daughter, named Isabel. As he searches, Jimmy, on vacation in Tijuana, is shocked to see Charlie. Hobbs is disbelieving at first, but travels to meet Jimmy anyway. Wright searches for Isabel, but finds that she has left the country illegally.

Russian Mob Members Letvinko (Elya Baskin) and Borlec (Raymond J. Barry) hire mercenary Damon (Luke Goss) to go after Wright and the money he stole from the mob. Damon is given a team (Gary Daniels, Geoffrey Ross, and Bokeem Woodbine) to tail Wright with. Simultaneously, Mexican drug lord Jorge Garza (Andy Garcia), deeply indebted, kidnaps Charlie and offers protection in exchange for some of his money. Garza's son Gabriel (Danny Pino) intends to keep their hostage overnight, but is attacked by Damon's team. In the battle Charlie escapes.

Charlie calls Hobbs and says he wishes to return to the U.S. The Garza's track him down and Damon's team follows. They all find Wright at a market, but before they can kidnap him Hobbs shows up and takes Charlie into his custody, and the mercenaries reluctantly leave. In a voiceover letter to Isabel, Wright discusses how he views his life as a failure. Gabriel breaks the news to a distraught Jorge, who leaves the empire in Gabriel's hands as the men he is in debt to take him away. Hobbs, keeping Wright in his car, tells Wright that he found out Wright had at most six months to live as cancer had spread through Charlie's body. Hobbs allows Wright to leave and Wright gives him the details of a bank account, presumably with the money Charlie stole.

The voiceover ends as Charlie sits at a beach, at some level of peace with himself.

== Cast ==
Target

- Aidan Quinn as Charlie Wright: A U.S. banker who scams billions and flees to Tijuana

FBI

- Mario Van Peebles as Agent Hobbs: A relentless Agent chasing Wright
- Jordan Belfi as Jimmy: Hobb's partner
- Corbin Bernsen as FBI Director Hill: Furious with Hobbs and demanding a quick resolution to the conflict

Mercenaries

- Luke Goss as Damon: Hired by the Russian Mob to go after Charlie Wright
- Gary Daniels as Michaels: The leader of a mercenary team in Tijuana, hired by Damon
- Bokeem Woodbine as Miller: A member of Michaels' team
- Geoffrey Ross as Baines: A member of Michaels' team

Gangsters

- Raymond J. Barry as Borlec: The Russian Mobster who hires Damon
- Elya Baskin as Letvinko: Hires Damon with Borlec
- Andy Garcia as Jorge Garza: A Mexican gangster who promises protection for Wright in exchange for money
- Danny Pino as Gabriel Garza: Jorge's brother
- Gina Gershon as Mariel Garza: Jorge's wife

Others

- Claudia Ferri as Mary: A prostitute who knows the woman Charlie is looking for

== Reception ==
A reviewer for the Courier-Post criticized the film, as they felt that it was "overburdened with unsavory characters". DVD Talk was similarly critical, writing "Little asides, including various appearances from an age-reducing facial cream all the women in the film lust after, lead me to believe "Across the Line" was a phone book script reduced to a Christmas list of ideas before shooting. Depth is lacking, along with a rich sense of purpose." The film also received a review from TV Guide.
