= Kim Carroll =

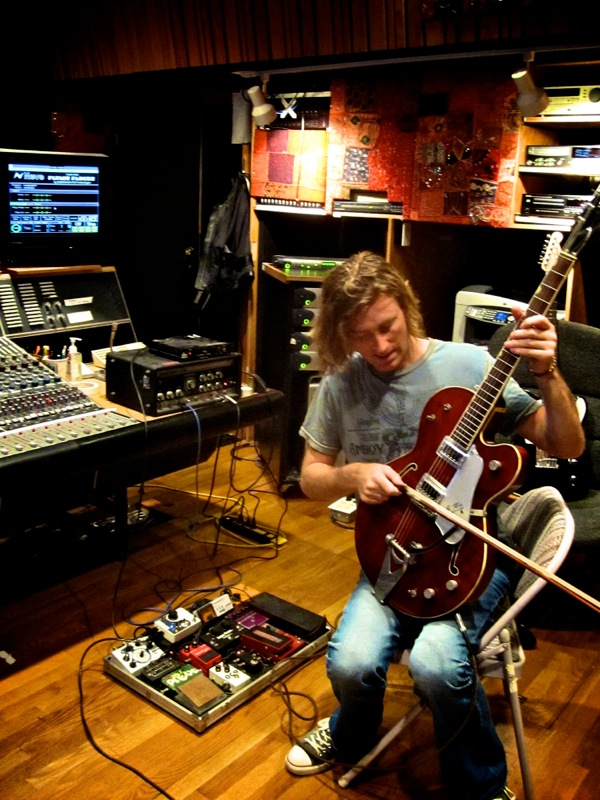
- Kim Carroll recording bowed guitar, Los Angeles, CA July 2010

Background information
- Born: 10 May 1970 (age 55)
- Origin: Cork, Ireland
- Genres: Film scores, ambient, rock, classical
- Occupations: Composer, musician, music producer, session musician
- Instruments: Guitar, piano, ronroco, bass guitar, organ, charango, percussion, banjo, mandolin
- Years active: 2002–present
- Website: kimcarrollmusic.com

Kim Carroll (born 10 May 1970 in Cork, Ireland) is a film score composer and multi-instrumentalist.

== Life and career ==
He attended Glenstal Abbey School where he studied music with pianist/composer Mícheál Ó Súilleabháin. After teaching music in Cork, he left for Los Angeles to concentrate on music composition and film scoring.

He writes and records on over 40 instruments collected from all over the world, including charango, ronroco, fretted violin, bowed guitar, prepared piano, prepared guitar, and bowed mandolin. In many of his compositions, Carroll performs all of the instruments. He uses live acoustic and electric instruments that are manipulated through vintage analogue equipment.

Carroll works out of his music studios in Los Angeles and Healdsburg, California. He is a 2009 Sundance Composer Fellow, and was awarded 'Gold Medal for Excellence' for his score to the thriller 'The Colony'.

Carroll's film credits include the critically acclaimed documentary 'The Horse Boy', the crime drama 'Across the Line: The Exodus of Charlie Wright', and 'The Uninvited' co-composed with Harry Gregson-Williams. Carroll also composed music for the dark comedy 'Congratulations', the dramatic feature 'Gone Missing', along with the music for the short films 'Hellholes', 'Insex', 'The Pool', and 'La Carretera'.

As a guitarist he has recorded with artists Sinéad O'Connor, Pat Monahan of Train, Gary Jules, Paul Buchanan of The Blue Nile, Colin Hay, as well as performing on the soundtracks for The Chronicles of Narnia: Prince Caspian, The Lincoln Lawyer, The Town, Domino, Gone Baby Gone, Veronica Guerin.
