= Prenatal screening for autism =

Medical practice

Prenatal screening for autism refers to medical practices aimed at detecting autism in utero, primarily through chromosomal microdeletion analysis. Still under development, it raises ethical concerns due to the variability of autistic developmental profiles and the potential for selective abortion. The first official authorization of pregnancy termination in cases of suspected autism was granted in Western Australia in 2013. Methods explored include hormone measurement in amniotic fluid, magnetic resonance imaging (MRI), and the search for specific genetic mutations. Chromosomal DNA microarray analysis is considered the most reliable approach. Since 2019, blood tests marketed as screenings have been available, although the polygenic nature of autism limits their reliability. Prenatal diagnostic centers increasingly offer such tests.

Intentions regarding selective abortion in relation to autism vary across countries and cultures. In Taiwan, a 2019 survey indicated that two-thirds of mothers of autistic children supported access to prenatal tests, and more than half expressed willingness to terminate a pregnancy in cases of suspected autism spectrum disorder (ASD). Many parents view these tests as part of their reproductive choice. Some health professionals, including Laurent Mottron and Simon Baron-Cohen, along with most autistic advocacy organizations, have criticized the potential eugenic implications of such practices. Initiatives such as The Autistic Genocide Clock have highlighted these concerns. In 2019, the United Nations issued a warning about the possible reduction of human diversity resulting from widespread selective abortion targeting autism.

== Methods ==
Prenatal screening for autism has been explored through various approaches. A 2015 Hungarian study reported that detectable chromosomal anomalies were rare, occurring in only 0.3 to 0.6% of cases, and proposed biparietal diameter measurement in the first trimester as a possible indicator. By 2020, chromosomal DNA microarray analysis was regarded as the most reliable and accurate method, surpassing traditional karyotyping.

These tests remain limited in precision and applicability. The causes of autism spectrum disorders (ASD) are multifactorial, and it is not possible to predict individual developmental trajectories. Outcomes vary widely, with some autistic individuals experiencing severe disability in adulthood, while others live independently or demonstrate exceptional abilities. Even individuals with the same genetic variant may present with markedly different levels of severity, or no syndrome at all.

=== Amniocentesis ===
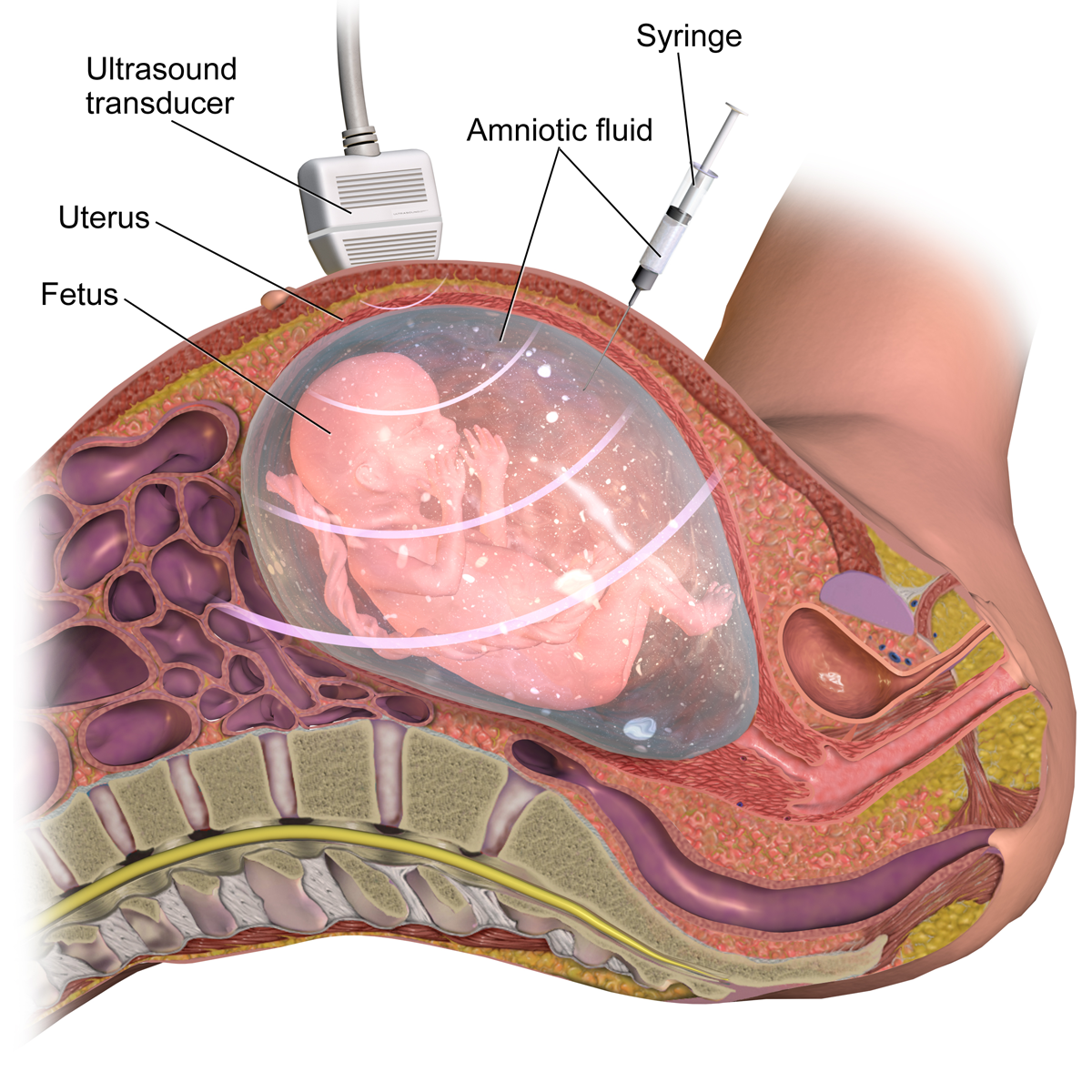
Diagram of an amniocentesis.

Research on prenatal factors potentially linked to autism began with studies such as that of British psychologist Simon Baron-Cohen, who reported in British Journal of Psychology (2009) that high levels of testosterone in amniotic fluid could be associated with autistic traits, detectable through amniocentesis. He noted, however, that this did not constitute a method of prenatal screening.

In 2016, a study in California suggested that mid-pregnancy levels of estriol, chorionic gonadotropin, and alpha-fetoprotein could serve as possible indicators of autism probability.

=== Blood test ===
In 2014, a blood test was reported that could detect a chromosomal deletion associated with a form of autism and other conditions, with a reliability of about 80%. This rate was considered insufficient for prenatal screening. By 2018, the reliability of the test was reported to have increased to 92%, making the statistical detection of autism risk in unborn children more consistent.

According to Spectrum News, the blood-based genetic test was still under development in July 2019. In January 2021, researchers from the University of California, Davis, and Stanford University reported the development of a test capable of identifying approximately 20% of autism cases, based on the detection of antibodies in maternal blood.

=== MRI ===
In early 2014, American researchers reported, using MRI, a disorganization of brain architecture specific to autistic fetuses. Pediatric neuroscientist Moriah Thomason (Wayne State University) described the finding as suggesting the possibility of future in utero diagnosis.

=== Analysis of the father's sperm ===
In 2018, researchers suggested that epigenetic differences in paternal sperm could increase the likelihood of autism in offspring. In 2019, a study at the University of California, San Diego, using sperm sequencing, refined predictive methods and proposed incorporating sperm analysis into genetic counseling.

== Targeted genetic mutations ==
The SHANK3 mutation, identified in 2007 by a French research team led by Thomas Bourgeron and present in 2–3% of individuals with autism, is frequently associated with intellectual disability. Mutations in SHANK1 and SHANK2 are generally linked to milder forms of disability. These mutations are detectable prenatally, theoretically allowing targeted prenatal screening.

The inverted duplication syndrome of chromosome 15 (15q11-q13), occurring in approximately 1 in 30,000 births, is associated with autism in most cases. Prenatal screening is possible, but does not determine the severity of symptoms. The 3q29 microdeletion is linked to increased susceptibility to autism, as well as schizophrenia and anxiety disorders, and can be identified through prenatal screening and preimplantation genetic diagnosis.

In 2010, a Toronto hospital announced the identification of a mutation on the X chromosome present in about 1% of autistic boys, involving duplications in the neuroligin 3 (NLGN3) and neuroligin 4 (NLGN4X) regions, and indicated the possible development of a genetic test. In 2009, the National Association of Molecular Genetics Practitioners (ANPGM) in France published guidelines on best practices for the analysis of the NLGN4 gene.

== History ==
In 2004, neurology professor Isabelle Rapin suggested that the development of prenatal screening for autism would depend on the identification of monogenic mutations or consistent genetic anomalies within the framework of genetic counseling. In 2006, a study examined parental expectations regarding prenatal screening for fragile X syndrome, in which autism was cited as a potential risk factor. Ethical issues related to autism screening were publicly raised in 2007 by French-Canadian psychiatrist Laurent Mottron. In 2008, Renate Lindeman, a Dutch parent of two children with Down syndrome, highlighted societal expectations regarding prenatal screening for autism and cancer susceptibility.

On April 10, 2019, Spectrum News reported that prenatal sequencing of genetic mutations associated with autism could become available. In August 2019, Sarah Adelaide Crawford of Southern Connecticut State University questioned whether large-scale authorization of prenatal examinations for autism risk should be considered.

== Countries and institutions authorizing autism screening and abortion ==
As of 2020, no specific laws regulate prenatal screening for autism spectrum disorders in most regions, including Taiwan, and no dedicated literature on the subject is available for obstetricians or prospective parents.

In 2013, medical authorities in Western Australia authorized genetic screening and allowed termination of pregnancy in cases where a "risk of autism" was detected in male embryos, noting the lower prevalence of autism in females. The measure was limited to families with an existing autistic child who sought to avoid the birth of another affected child. The policy was criticized, particularly for its sex-based differentiation. Biologist Jacques Testart commented: "Since the genes for autism are not identified and we know that at least three times as many boys as girls are affected, then we eliminate the boys."

In France, the National Association of Molecular Genetics Practitioners (ANPGM), in its guidelines on chromosomal microarray analysis during the prenatal period, recommended that copy number variations (CNVs) associated with late-onset diseases or predisposition factors, such as autism, be reviewed by Multidisciplinary Prenatal Diagnosis Centers (CPDPN). The guidelines specify that CNVs may be reported if they are considered to provide a direct benefit for the fetus or its family based on current knowledge.

According to a 2018 article in Le Monde, the prenatal diagnostic unit of the American Hospital of Paris conducted screening for mutations associated with autism. In cases where a microdeletion linked to autism was identified and confirmed through amniocentesis, the option of medical termination of pregnancy was discussed with the patient. In 2019, similar screening followed by the possibility of termination was reported in Israel. Prenatal genetic testing for autism-related mutations has also been available on a limited scale in certain specialized institutions in the United States since at least 2019.

In Taiwan, prenatal genetic screening through amniocentesis has been offered since at least 2019 to pregnant women between weeks 16 and 20 of gestation, regardless of family history. The procedure aims to detect fetal risks for various genetic and genomic conditions, including autism spectrum disorder (ASD), and may be followed by a proposal for termination of pregnancy.

== Ethical and social issues ==
The detection of genetic markers has been associated with use for selective termination rather than with improving the lives of autistic individuals. In 2013, when Western Australia became the first jurisdiction to authorize prenatal screening and termination of pregnancy for autism risk, the decision generated reactions ranging from calls to extend the authorization to female fetuses to accusations of eugenics.

Parents who received prenatal screening results suggesting a probability of autism tended to perceive their children as less competent at the age of one compared to parents whose screenings indicated no such risk. A study of 184 mothers of autistic children in the United States found that psychosocial factors and medical advice played a significant role in decisions regarding genetic screening.

The influence of health professionals, particularly obstetricians, on the final decision of expectant mothers regarding genetic screening has been identified as significant. Some reports from French parents describe negative comments from midwives concerning the value of life for autistic children.

=== Risk of eugenics ===
The report by Catalina Devandas Aguilar, dated December 17, 2019, and published by the UN notes:

Biomedical research on certain disorders, such as autism, raises the thorny question of whether it is desirable to prevent such disorders, as doing so will impoverish human diversity.

— Catalina Devandas Aguilar

A potential risk of liberal eugenics, driven by parental demand, has been noted in relation to prenatal screening for autism, as acknowledged in particular by Dr. Andrew Whitehouse. Concerns have been raised that increased access to such screening could lead to higher rates of selective abortion, motivated by apprehension about raising a child with developmental difficulties. A 2014 survey in the United States found that 15.9% of couples reported they would terminate a pregnancy if a prenatal test indicated a risk of severe autism, compared to 43% in the case of Down syndrome. A 2019 study of 333 mothers of autistic children in Taiwan reported that 66.6% supported prenatal detection of autism susceptibility genes, and 53.1% indicated they would consider termination in the event of a positive result. The authors suggested that these findings may extend to other societies influenced by Chinese culture, as well as to some Western contexts, citing the role of social stigma associated with disability.

The proportion of parents who choose not to have another child after the birth of an autistic child varies by country, with studies reporting higher rates in California (around one-third) compared to Denmark (6%). In Israel, where prenatal screening is widespread and practices are generally liberal, the rate of selective abortion is similar to that observed in other Western countries.

=== Support ===
==== From parents or future parents ====
Prospective parents are generally supportive of access to tests detecting genetic mutations associated with autism, viewing such information as beneficial and as a means to prepare for the potential birth of a child with special needs.

A 2012 survey conducted among U.S. citizens of Chinese origin indicated strong demand for the commercialization of a prenatal autism screening test, primarily for use in decisions regarding abortion. In France, a 2018 anonymous survey at the prenatal screening center of the American Hospital of Neuilly reported that 85% of parents or prospective parents were in favor of such screening.

In Taiwan, interviews conducted in 2018 with 39 parents of autistic children involved in associations indicated broad support for prenatal screening, primarily with the intention of requesting an abortion. A 2020 study in Taiwan found that this intention was more prevalent among younger women than older women and identified a strong correlation between the social acceptability of prenatal screening and the likelihood of considering abortion.

In 2023, a study in Australia found that participants in a biological data project on autism expressed interest in information from a prenatal test, while some questioned its usefulness if the severity of potential disorders could not be determined.

==== From health professionals ====
The physician Andrew Whitehouse, from the University of Western Australia, as well as the Hungarian researchers who published in 2015, justify the use of pregnancy termination on the grounds that autism most often leads to a reduction in the quality of life of the individuals concerned.

Michael Snyder, director of the Center for Genomics and Personalized Medicine at the Stanford University School of Medicine, stated in January 2018 that "Knowing very early that a child suffers from a form of autism can greatly facilitate his or her support during development. My position is therefore that, if a complete prenatal genetic sequencing is carried out, it must clearly be used by parents and physicians to identify potential diseases that can be treated from birth."

In January 2021, the American team from the University of California at Davis and Stanford University justified the development of its test by stating that "ASD constitutes an important health problem and a considerable socio-economic burden for affected families and the health care system."

==== From politicians ====
In 2019, French deputy and geneticist Philippe Berta expressed support for prenatal autism screening.

=== Opposition ===
==== From parents or future parents ====
According to a 2018 study in Taiwan, about one-third of parents opposed prenatal autism screening. Reported reasons included religious beliefs, personal convictions, doubts about the test's value and accuracy, and concerns about potential negative consequences. Opposition to prenatal screening and abortion was more prevalent in religious communities.

In The Guardian in 2009, Charlotte Moore, mother of two nonverbal autistic children and author of an autobiographical work, explained her opposition to such tests because: "Most autistics are in good physical health. A minority suffers from epilepsy and gut problems are quite common, but for the most part, 'quality of life' depends on the quality of care and understanding, appropriate education, and a living environment that takes their sensory hypersensitivities into account." In 2021, Catherine Des Rivières-Pigeon, professor of sociology at the University of Québec in Montréal and mother of two autistic children, emphasized "important ethical reflections on the value of life."

==== From health professionals ====
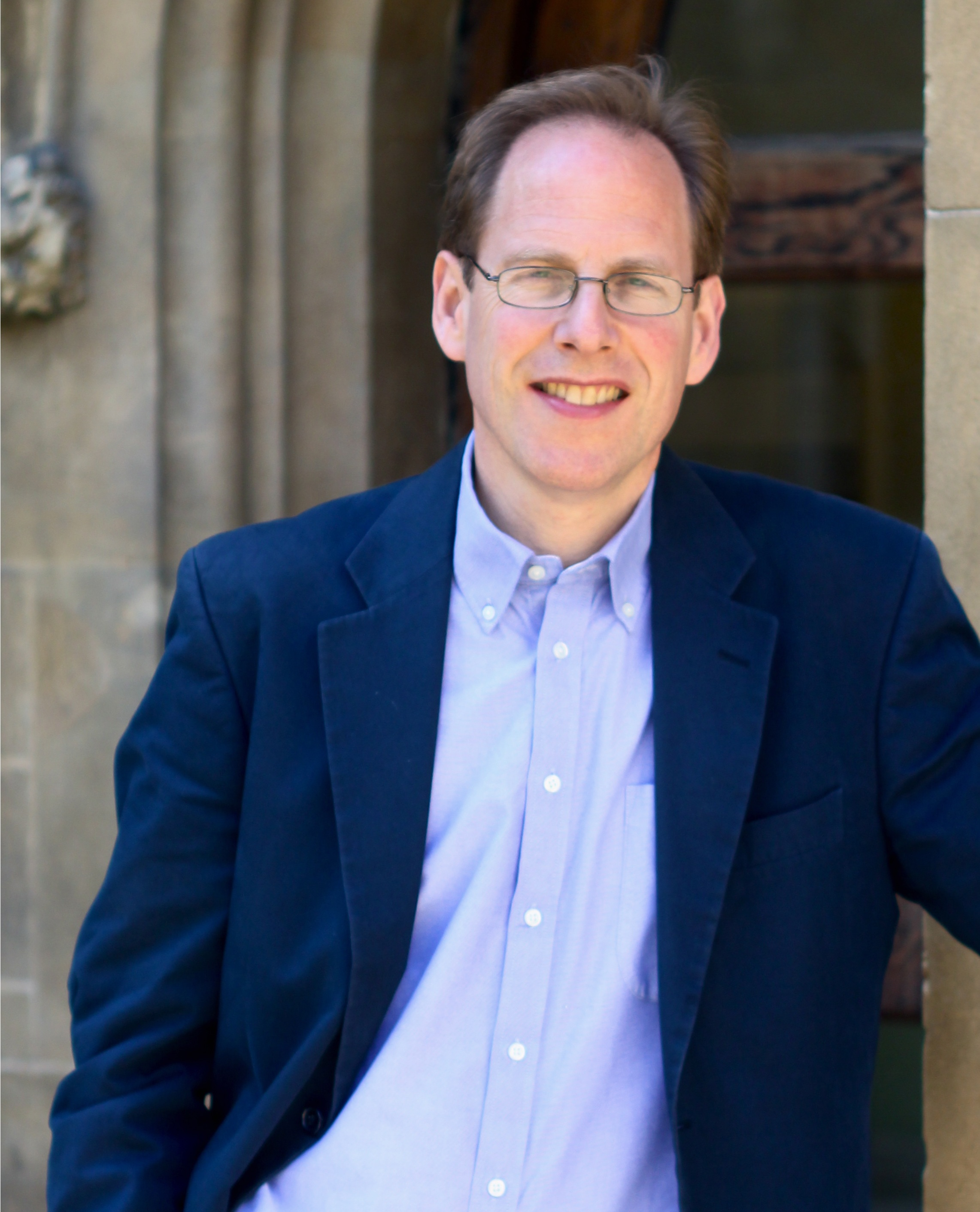
Simon Baron-Cohen, one of the researchers who took an ethical stance on prenatal screening for autism.

In February 2007, a professor in the Department of Psychiatry at the University of Montréal, Laurent Mottron, stated that with sequencing of genes linked to autism, "there are ethical problems: about half of autistics have normal or superior intelligence, and they dislike the idea that there might no longer be people like them." In 2009, Simon Baron-Cohen highlighted the risk of eugenic policies and noted that some autistic individuals demonstrate exceptional abilities. In 2020, following a study he co-directed on differences in brain development between autistic and non-autistic embryos, he reaffirmed his opposition to eugenics and to the elimination of autistic people.

Similarly, when asked in 2012 about the future arrival of prenatal screening for autism, the French physician Didier Sicard replied: "This is what is called precautionary eugenics. We forget all these people with disabilities, these artists, these geniuses (in the case of autism in particular), who carry so many riches."

Mottron and Baron-Cohen consider the former diagnosis known as "Asperger's" to be an adaptive advantage.

==== From autistic people ====
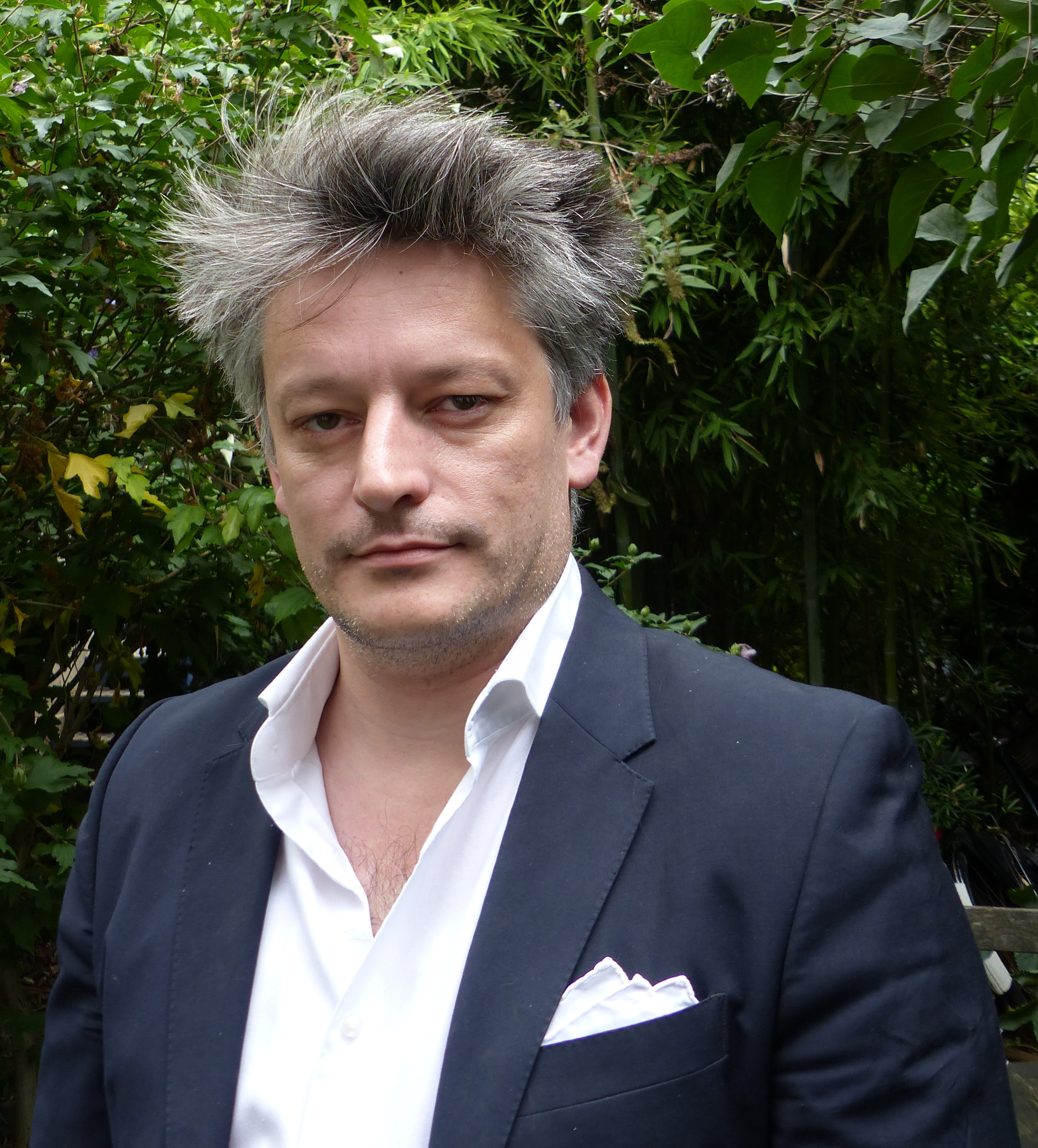
Hugo Horiot, one of the autistic activists opposed to prenatal screening.

According to legal scholar Paul Steven Miller and Rebecca Leah Levine, opposition by disabled people to the screening of their own disabilities for abortion is a recognized social reality. They argue that this position contrasts with the medical perspective, which is widely disseminated and often used to justify screening and pregnancy termination policies, while the views of disabled people are less represented and sometimes framed in terms of a threat of a "genetic genocide." In 2005, activist Meg Evans created a ten-year countdown, the Autistic Genocide Clock, in reaction to a public statement by researcher Joseph Buxbaum, who suggested that genetic research on autism could make prenatal screening possible within a decade. Evans argued that such a development could lead to the widespread abortion of fetuses identified as autistic, which she described as "genocide," and created the clock to raise awareness of what she considered a risk to the survival of the autistic population, drawing parallels with historical attempts to eliminate minority groups. She stopped the countdown in 2011, noting what she viewed as a cultural shift toward greater recognition of neurodiversity.

According to sociologist Brigitte Chamak, Martijn Dekker, a Dutch citizen diagnosed with autism, founded the association Aspies For Freedom in 2004 to oppose the potential eugenic use of prenatal screening tests and to criticize certain interventions, including chelation therapy and applied behavior analysis (ABA). In 2018, actor and activist Hugo Horiot described the development of prenatal screening as the greatest risk facing autistic people. Philosopher and sociologist Josef Schovanec, who also has autism and coined the neologism "auticide" to denote the elimination of a person because they are autistic, stated that the availability of such screening would lead to the gradual disappearance of autistic individuals.

American activist Ari Ne'eman has argued that, since autism is primarily of genetic origin, the most likely form of prevention would be eugenic abortion, citing the high rate of selective abortions in cases of Down syndrome as a precedent. He noted that such a prospect raises significant ethical concerns. The Quebec collective Aut'Créatifsopposed the potential commercialization of prenatal tests, describing it as a "final solution." Its cofounder, Lucila Guerrero, the mother of an autistic child, characterized it as an inevitable form of eugenics that would reinforce the stigmatization of autistic people.

The French association CLE-Autistes (Collective for the Freedom of Expression of Autistic People) criticized what it described as eugenic practices and referred to them as "auticides" allegedly carried out at the American Hospital of Paris.

== See also ==
- Prenatal testing
- Heritability of autism
- Autistic rights movement

== Bibliography ==
- Chen, Wei-Ju; Zhao, Shixi; Huang, Tse-Yang; Kwok, Oi-Man (2020). "Autism Spectrum Disorders: Prenatal Genetic Testing and Abortion Decision-Making among Taiwanese Mothers of Affected Children". International Journal of Environmental Research and Public Health. 17 (2): 476–489. doi:10.3390/ijerph17020476. ISSN 1660-4601. PMC 7013751. PMID 31940763.
- Vanya, M; Szücs, S; Szili, K; Vetró, Á; Bártfai, G (2015). "The possibility of prenatal diagnosis of autism spectrum disorder". Psychiatr. Hung. 30 (3): 303–307. PMID 26471032.
- Xu, Lei; Richman, Alice; Mitchell, Linda; Luo, Huabin (2020). "Factors Influencing Decisions About Prenatal Genetic Testing for Autism Among Mothers of Children with Autism Spectrum Disorders". Advances in Neurodevelopmental Disorders. 4 (2): 190–198. doi:10.1007/s41252-020-00151-0. ISSN 2366-7540.
- Zaraska, Marta (August 14, 2019). "The problems with prenatal testing for autism". Spectrum - Autism Research News.
