= Kristin Neff =

American professor of psychology

Kristin Neff is an associate professor in the department of educational psychology at the University of Texas at Austin. She researches self-compassion.

== Early life and education ==
Neff received her bachelor's degree from the University of California, Los Angeles in communication studies and her doctorate from the University of California, Berkeley, where she studied moral development. She subsequently completed two years of postdoctoral research at the University of Denver, focusing on self-concept development.

== Research ==
Neff has been credited with conducting the first academic studies on self-compassion, which she developed an interest in during her final year of graduate school. In 2003, she developed and validated the Self-compassion Scale (SCS), a 26-item instrument designed to measure self-compassion across three core components: self-kindness versus self-judgment, common humanity versus isolation, and mindfulness versus over-identification. A 12-item short form of the scale was later developed and validated by Raes, Pommier, Neff, and Van Gucht in 2011. Both versions of the scale are widely used in psychological research. Her research has drawn a distinction between self-compassion and self-esteem, arguing that self-compassion offers psychological benefits without the pitfalls associated with the pursuit of high self-esteem, such as narcissism and social comparison.

== Publications ==
Neff is the author of multiple books, including:

- Self-Compassion: The Proven Power of Being Kind to Yourself, published by William Morrow
- Fierce Self-Compassion: How Women Can Harness Kindness to Speak Up, Claim Their Power and Thrive.

Co-publications with Dr. Chris Germer:

- The Mindful Self-Compassion Workbook (Guilford, 2018)
- Teaching the Mindful Self-Compassion Program: A Guide for Professionals (2019)
- Mindful Self-Compassion for Burnout: Tools to Help You Heal and Recharge When You're Wrung Out by Stress (2024).

She has also written for University of California, Berkeley's Greater Good Magazine.

== Mindful Self-Compassion program ==
Together with Chris Germer, Neff developed the Mindful Self-Compassion (MSC) program, an empirically supported training program in self-compassion. The two co-founded the nonprofit Center for Mindful Self-Compassion, which offers self-compassion training in a variety of formats. Neff also offers an online self-paced introductory course in self-compassion, which includes access to monthly events with expert guest speakers, drop-in mentor sessions, and other resources.

== Personal life ==
Neff was married to author Rupert Isaacson. Their son, Rowan, was diagnosed with autism at age three. As of 2021, Neff and Isaacson are divorced.

After observing that Rowan's condition appeared to improve through contact with horses, the family traveled to Mongolia to seek further healing. Their journey was documented in Isaacson's book The Horse Boy: A Father's Quest to Heal His Son, published by Little, Brown and Company in 2009, and in a companion documentary film of the same name. The film premiered at the 2009 Sundance Film Festival, where it was nominated for the Grand Jury Prize and won the Lone Star State Audience Award at South by Southwest.
