= Sandrine Willems =

Belgian writer and director

Sandrine Willems (born 1968) is a Belgian writer of fiction and a director of television documentaries.

== Biography ==
Willems, who was born in 1968, received her doctorate in philosophy in 1991 with a thesis called Temps et mouvement dialectique dans l’œuvre de Georges Bataille. She was also licensed in drama, and got a master's degree in psychopathologie in 2007. She lives in Nice, dividing her time between writing and practicing psychotherapy for addicts.

== Literary work ==
=== Fiction ===
- Una voce poco fa. Un chant de Maria Malibran, Paris, Éditions Autrement, 2000. ISBN 2-86260-975-7
- Les Petits Dieux (eleven novellas), Paris, Les Impressions Nouvelles: 2001.
- Le roman dans les ronces ou La légende de Charles VI, roi fou, et de sa servante, Paris, Bruxelles: Les Impressions Nouvelles, 2003. ISBN 2-906131-63-6.
- Le Sourire de Bérénice, Paris, Bruxelles: Les Impressions Nouvelles, 2004. ISBN 2-906131-63-6.
- Élégie à Michel-Ange, photos by Marie-Françoise Plissart, Paris, Bruxelles: Les Impressions Nouvelles, 2005. ISBN 2-87449-002-4.
- À l’Espère, Bruxelles: Les Impressions Nouvelles, 2007. ISBN 2-87449-002-4.
- Éros en son absence, Bruxelles: Les Impressions Nouvelles, 2009. ISBN 978-2-87449-064-4.
- L’Extrême, Bruxelles: Les Impressions Nouvelles, 2010, ISBN 978-2-87449-091-0

=== Essays ===
- L’Animal à l’âme. De l’animal-sujet aux psychothérapies accompagnées par des animaux, Paris: Éditions du Seuil, 2011. ISBN 978-2-02-105430-9. Prix Verdickt-Rijdams 2012 de l’Académie royale de langue et de littérature françaises de Belgique
- Carnets de l’autre amour, Bruxelles: Les Impressions Nouvelles, 2014. ISBN 978-2-87449-204-4

== Documentaries ==
- Philippe Herreweghe, et le Verbe s’est fait chant, 1999
- Chants et soupirs des renaissants, selon Paul Van Nevel, 2001
- D'errance et de racines, portrait du lieu à vivre Médiation, avec Marie-Françoise Plissart, 2014
