= Nichole Daher =

American author and autism advocate

- Born: 10 March 1986 (age 40)
- Citizenship: United States
- Education: University of Louisiana at Lafayette University of Arkansas for Medical Sciences
- Occupations: Author, Autism advocate

Nichole Daher (born March 10, 1986) is an American author and autism advocate associated with autism therapy initiatives in the United States. She is the founder of Success On The Spectrum, an autism therapy organization and the CEO of SOS Franchising.

== Education ==
Daher studied nuclear medicine technology at the University of Louisiana at Lafayette. She later attended the University of Arkansas for Medical Sciences, where she earned a bachelor's degree in nuclear medical technology.

== Career ==
Daher has been involved in autism-related advocacy and therapy initiatives, including work connected with Success on the Spectrum, an autism therapy provider based in Houston, Texas. Her work relating to autism therapy services has been referenced in media coverage discussing applied behavior analysis (ABA) therapy and autism support services.

In 2026 Daher appeared on the television series Legacy Makers (Season 1, Episode 9), discussing autism therapy services and related initiatives.

Daher is the author of Charting New Waters: The Story Behind Success On The Spectrum.

== Personal life ==
Daher has publicly discussed experiences relating to raising a child with autism, which influenced her involvement in autism advocacy.
