= The Horse Boy =

2009 documentary film by Michel Orion Scott

- Theatrical release poster
- Directed by: Michel Orion Scott
- Produced by: Rupert Isaacson
- Music by: Kim Carroll; Lili Haydn; Fish Lounge
- Distributed by: Zeitgeist Films UK/US Warner Home Video US DVD
- Release dates: January 2009 (Sundance); September 30, 2009
- Running time: 93 minutes
- Countries: United States, United Kingdom
- Language: English

The Horse Boy is a documentary feature film about the quest of British journalist Rupert Isaacson and his wife, Kristen Neff, to find healing for their autistic son, Rowan, after discovering that Rowan's condition appears to be improved by contact with horses. The family leave their home in Texas for an arduous journey to Mongolia. It premiered at the 2009 Sundance Film Festival under the name Over the Hills and Far Away.

== Book ==
Isaacson wrote a companion book about the experience titled The Horse Boy: A Father's Quest to Heal His Son, which was released by Little, Brown and Company on April 14, 2009. It was a New York Times bestseller.

== Film ==
The film was directed by Michel Orion Scott and is distributed by Zeitgeist Films. It was nominated for the Grand Jury Prize at the 2009 Sundance Film Festival, and won the Lone Star State Audience Award at South by Southwest in March 2009.

== See also ==
- List of films about autism
- List of films about horses
- Autism spectrum disorders in the media
- Equine-assisted therapy on autistic people
