= Ryan's Law =

South Carolina law requiring insurance companies to cover autism treatments

Ryan's Law is a South Carolina law that requires insurance companies to cover treatments related to autism spectrum disorder (ASD). The law states that insurance companies must provide up to $50,000, annually, on behavioral therapy, up to the age of 16. The law provides coverage for various treatments, including applied behavior analysis, which was previously denied as "experimental". Ryan's Law also prohibits insurers from refusing other medical care to children because they are autistic. The law does not apply to people who (or companies which) are self-insured.

The bill was authored by Lorri Unumb, who was at the time a law professor at the Charleston School of Law, and the mother of a four-year-old autistic boy, after whom the law is named. Passage of the legislation took nearly two years, and was the result of an intense grassroots campaign which was orchestrated by Unumb and supported by hundreds of families in South Carolina. Lacking funds to hire a lobbyist, Unumb and other supporters of the law personally lobbied South Carolina legislators through visits and letter-writing campaigns. The bill was passed in May 2007, and the law went into effect in July 2008.

== Terminology related to autism ==
Ryan's Law defines ASD as one of three autism subtypes: autistic disorder, Asperger's syndrome or pervasive developmental disorder not otherwise specified. These subtypes appeared in the fourth edition of the Diagnostic and Statistical Manual of Mental Disorders (which was first published in 1994), but were collapsed into the umbrella label ASD with the release of the fifth edition of the manual in 2013.

== Passage of the bill ==
=== Initial filing ===
The bill was written by Unumb and pre-filed in the South Carolina legislature in late 2005. Rep. Nathan Ballentine (R-Irmo) was the primary sponsor in the South Carolina House of Representatives, and Rep. Ray Cleary (R-Murrell's Inlet) was the primary sponsor in the South Carolina Senate. The companion House and Senate bills were first considered by the South Carolina legislature during the 2006 session. The Senate bill (S.958) was assigned to the Senate Banking and Insurance Committee, where it received strong support from the committee's chairman, Senator David Thomas (R-Greenville). Thomas created a subcommittee, which held a public hearing on the bill on January 12, 2006; this hearing was attended by hundreds of supporters. Witnesses in support of the bill included Unumb, Dr. Gina Green, Dr. Jane Charles, Dr. Shelley Holstrum, Dr. Scott Edwards, and Walt Jenner, among others.

=== Medicaid waiver ===
In the South Carolina House of Representatives, the bill (H.4351) was assigned to the House Labor, Commerce and Industry Committee (LCI), chaired by Rep. Harry Cato. During public hearings before the Insurance Subcommittee of LCI, the House bill was amended considerably as part of a deal struck by the insurance industry and some legislators. The insurance language was removed from the bill, and was replaced by language directing the South Carolina Department of Health and Human Services and the Department of Disabilities and Special Needs to set up a government program to benefit children with autism. As amended, the bill passed in 2006. Shortly thereafter, South Carolina applied to the federal government for a Medicaid waiver, in order to establish the Pervasive Developmental Disorders waiver program. Through this program, parents of autistic children aged 3 through 11 could apply for funding to cover an applied behavior analysis therapy program for their child. Each child could receive up to $50,000 in funding, annually, for up to 3 years. In 2007, approximately one hundred children in South Carolina began receiving therapy services under the new program, and by 2009, over four hundred children were receiving services.

=== Return to legislature ===
In 2007, a group of supporters of the bill, led by Unumb, Lisa Rollins, and Marcella Ridley, returned to the South Carolina legislature to make another attempt to pass the insurance legislation. This time, the House bill (H.3468) was sponsored by Rep. Skipper Perry (R-Aiken), with continued support from Nathan Ballentine, lead sponsor in 2006. The Senate bill (S.20) was sponsored by Sen. Dick Elliott (D-Myrtle Beach), with continued support from the 2006 lead sponsor, Sen. Ray Cleary.

Additional hearings were held on the companion bills during the 2007 session, and numerous legislators co-sponsored the bills. Sen. Joel Lourie (D-Columbia) played an instrumental role in arranging negotiations between those in favor of the bill and those representing the insurance companies, and in furthering discussions during intense deadline pressure. On May 25, 2007, the General Assembly passed the Senate bill.

=== Veto and override ===
South Carolina Governor Mark Sanford vetoed the bill on June 6, 2007, the penultimate night of the 2007 legislative session. The next morning, supporters of the law appeared at the South Carolina State House to plead with the legislators to put their bill on the day's agenda, and to override the governor's veto. On June 7, 2007, the South Carolina Senate overrode the governor's veto on a voice vote, and the South Carolina House overrode the veto on a roll call vote. Both chambers' override votes were unanimous. In April 2008, CNN profiled the passage of Ryan's Law.

=== Failed updates ===
In April 2015, during the state's 121st legislative session, the Senate passed an update to Ryan's Law (bill S. 135). Amongst other changes, the bill modernized references to diagnostic labels, removed patient age requirements and repealed benefit caps. The bill did not become law, as the House did not vote on it before the end of the session. A House version of the bill (H. 5055) was introduced later in the session, but did not receive a vote in either chamber.

A similar House bill that did not include the diagnostic-label updates (H. 3747) was introduced in February 2017 during the 122nd legislative session. It did not receive a vote in either chamber. According to the Autism Society of South Carolina, one of the purposes of the failed bill was to remove a loophole that exempted the health-insurance plans of small employers.

== Summary of the law ==
Ryan's Law mandates that insurance companies provide up to $50,000 a year of coverage for behavioral therapy until the age of 16. An autistic child must be diagnosed at age eight or before, and the $50,000 maximum on behavioral therapy is to be adjusted every year on January 1 based on the Consumer Price Index. The law further prohibits insurance companies from refusing autistic children other medical treatment or attention on the basis of their condition. Autism cannot be used as a basis for refusing care for other medically reasonable or necessary treatment or procedures. The law does not cover individuals who are insured through employers that have self-funded plans.
