= Visual schedules =

Series of pictures showing steps of an activity

Visual schedules use a series of pictures to communicate a series of activities or the steps of a specific activity. They are often used to help children understand and manage the daily events in their lives. They can be created using pictures, photographs, or written words, depending upon the ability of the child. Visual schedules are placed on a schedule board or notebook to provide a clear expectation for the child. Ideally, visual schedules are introduced with adult guidance that gradually decreases with time. They are frequently introduced as a component of speech therapy, but can also be used at school and at home.

A recent online survey found that 43.2% of parents of autistic children use visual schedules.

== See also ==
- Picture communication symbols
- Picture Exchange Communication System
