= Employment of autistic people =

Social issue

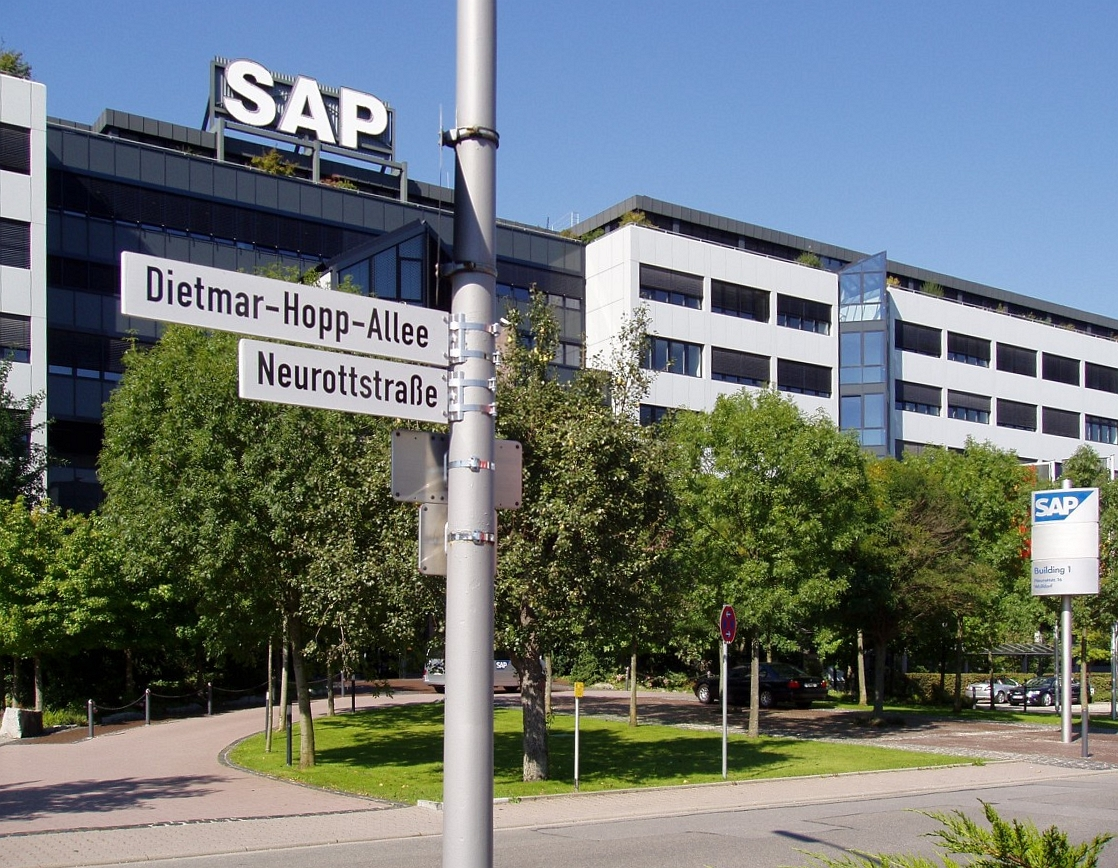
SAP's head office in Walldorf, Germany, a software design and sales company that practices affirmative action in favor of autistic workers

The employment of autistic people is a complex social issue, and the rate of unemployment remains among the highest among all workers with physical and neurological disabilities. The rate of employment for autistic people is generally seen to be very low in the US and across the globe, but accurate measurement is rare, as studies often have small sample sizes and rely on self-reporting. A 2021 report in the United Kingdom found 71% of autistic adults are unemployed. In the United States, estimates of unemployment range from 39% to 85%. Many autistic adults face significant barriers to full-time employment and have few career prospects despite the fact that approximately 50% of autistic individuals have a normal or high-normal IQ and no significant physical disabilities. In fact, autistic young adults are more likely to be unemployed than people with learning disabilities, intellectual disabilities, or speech/language impairment.

Many autistic people have long been kept in specialized institutions, and even larger numbers remain dependent on their families. The most restricted prospects are for nonverbal people with behavioral disorders. Even highly functional autistic adults are often underemployed, and their jobs options are limited to low-skilled, part-time, discontinuous jobs in sheltered workshops.

A wide variety of careers and positions are potentially accessible, although positions requiring little human interaction are notoriously favored, and associated with greater success. Sectors such as intelligence and information processing in the military, the hospitality and restaurant industry, translation and copywriting, information technology, art, handicraft, mechanics and nature, agriculture and animal husbandry are particularly sought-after and adapted.

Several issues for low employment (and high lay off) rate of autistic people have been identified in peer-reviewed literature:

1. difficulties interacting with supervisors and coworkers, which stem from the double empathy problem creating a comprehension barrier between the autistic employee and their generally non-autistic colleagues. Examples include "not asking for help when needed or locate other work to complete, when their supervisors were unavailable" and "insubordination after responding to feedback by arguing with supervisors and refusing to correct their work".
2. sensory hypersensitivities, and from
3. employers' intolerance of these particularities, even though such problems can be easily corrected with appropriate training and low-cost job accommodations.

Frequent discrimination on the job market reduces the prospects of autistic people, who are also often victims of unsuitable work organization. A number of measures can be put in place to resolve these difficulties, including job coaching, and adapting working conditions in terms of sensoriality and working hours. Some companies practice affirmative action, particularly in the IT sector, where "high-functioning" autistic people are seen as a competitive asset.

Nevertheless, these efforts have had mostly cosmetic effect, and did not result in a statistically significant improvement in the employment outcome of autistic adults. In a 2021 Forbes article Michael S. Bernick wrote:

1. Autism employment initiatives with major employers continue to grow in number, but combined they impact a very small percentage of the autism adult population.
2. Universities, major nonprofits and foundations have lagged behind the private sector in autism hiring, even though, with their missions, they should be at the lead.
3. "Autism talent advantage" is a common phrase among advocates, usually associated with technical skills, memory skills, or some forms of savant skills. But the past few years have shown that the technical skills are present in only a small segment of the adult autism population, and the memory and savant skills are not easily fit into the job market.
4. We're learning that "autism-friendly workplace" should mean far more than lighting or sound modifications... The true "autism friendly" workplace will be one with a culture that balances business needs with forms of greater patience and flexibility.
5. We're learning the importance of addressing comorbidities that have neurological ties to autism. Such comorbidities as obsessive-compulsive disorder, anxiety disorder and major depressive disorder...bring impediments to job success that are far more serious than failure to make eye contact or understand social cues.

== History ==
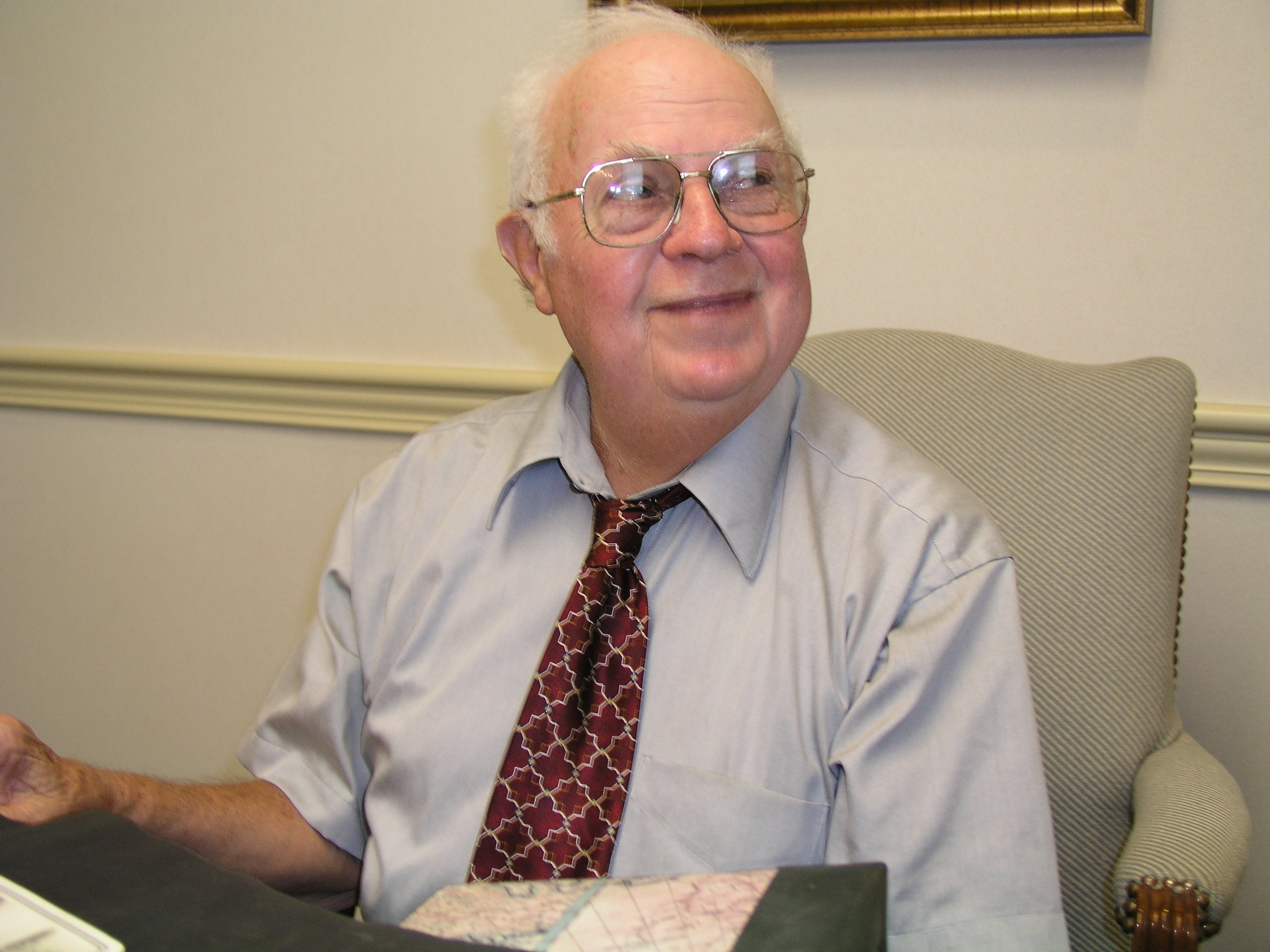
Donald Triplett, the first person to be diagnosed with formal childhood autism, worked as a bank clerk.

The issue of employment is a very recent one in the debates on autism. People diagnosed with infantile autism have long been considered unable to work. According to American investigative journalist Steve Silberman, when American psychiatrist Edward Ritvo and his team published an article in 1988 suggesting that autistic adults were capable of having a family life and a job, they were laughed at by most specialists at the time.

At the end of the 20th century the diagnostic criteria for autism were broadened, making it easier and earlier to detect. This led to an increase in the number of diagnoses: autism affects around 1% of the world's population (in 2016), with varying degrees of disability. The DSM-5 criteria allow diagnosis on the basis of difficulties in communication and social interaction, and restricted and repetitive behaviors and interests, with a "clinically significant impact in terms of functioning" in social, academic and occupational terms. These symptoms are present from early childhood, but "may be masked later in life by learned strategies". There is thus a wide diversity of profiles among autistic adults, in terms of skills, social functioning and interests. This variability depends on individual factors such as intelligence, language skills and the presence of co-morbidities, as well as environmental factors such as family support, the provision of appropriate interventions and services, quality of life and various socio-emotional factors.

In the United States, and California in particular, associations and public figures have been campaigning for the employment of autistic people since at least 1999. That same year, Temple Grandin, herself autistic, published a short article recommending the use of autistic people's employment skills, in particular visual thinking. At the end of 2000, researcher Sophie Nesbitt worked with the UK's National Autistic Society (NAS) to study the employability of people diagnosed with Asperger syndrome. The gradual inclusion of autism in the field of disability at international level is reflected in the Council of Europe directive of 27 November 2000, advocating "non-discrimination in employment and occupation", which applies to autistic workers. Its French version is the 2005 Law for Equal Rights and Opportunities, Participation and Citizenship for People with Disabilities, which led to the creation of the departmental homes for the disabled. Between 2003 and 2008, the number of autistic adults in the US receiving Vocational Rehabilitation Services more than tripled.

In 2015 UN Secretary Ban Ki-moon pointed out that the majority of autistic adults worldwide are unemployed. In February 2017, the first French report dedicated to the employment of autistic adults was submitted by Josef Schovanec, PhD in philosophy and social sciences (EHESS), himself autistic, stating that "in France, the employment of autistic people is clearly still in its infancy". In the UK, the National Autistic Society (NAS) handed over a petition to the British government on 21 February 2017, signed by 30,000 people, calling for the employment of autistic adults to be made a priority. The Malakoff-Médéric foundation opens a specialized French site at the end of 2018.

=== Scientific literature ===
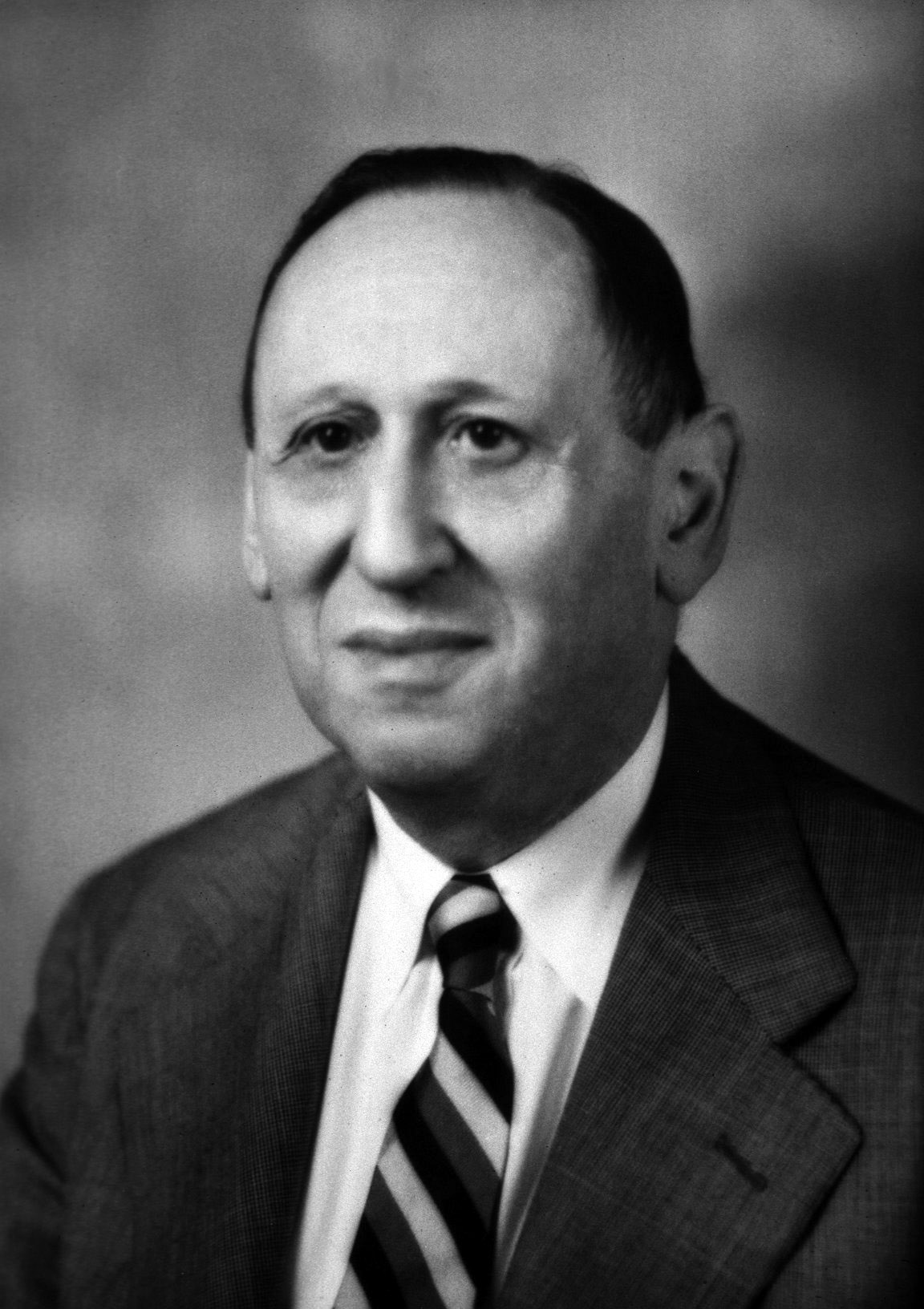
Leo Kanner followed the evolution of the children he diagnosed in 1943.

Leo Kanner, the child psychiatrist who discovered infantile autism, followed the progress of the eleven children (generally from privileged backgrounds) he diagnosed for the publication of his landmark study in 1943. Many went on to obtain decent jobs (in particular "patient 0", Donald Triplett), while those placed in institutions had little or no autonomy in adulthood. The first identified study of socio-professional outcome dates from 1970, based on five to fifteen years' follow-up of people diagnosed at the time with infantile psychosis. Specific studies began to be carried out in the United States in the second half of the 1980s.

In 2010 American psychiatrist and researcher Dawn Hendricks published Employment and adults with autism spectrum disorders: Challenges and strategies for success. Highlighting the very low employment rate and the desire of autistic adults to work, she argued for the option of employment support to be made available to all. The following year, an article by French-Canadian researcher and psychiatrist Laurent Mottron appeared in the scientific journal Nature, entitled "Changing perceptions: The power of autism". Testifying to his experience of working with autistic researchers, including Michelle Dawson, as part of his team at the University of Montreal, he hopes that more autistic people will be involved in research teams:

[...] They are there because of their intellectual and personal qualities. I believe they contribute to science because of their autism, not in spite of it. Everyone knows stories of autistic people with extraordinary scholarly abilities, such as Stephen Wiltshire, who can exquisitely draw detailed cityscapes from memory after a helicopter ride. None of my lab members are savants. They are 'ordinary' autistic people [...]. – Laurent Mottron, Changing perceptions: The power of autism.

The first review specifically devoted to the employment rehabilitation of autistic adults, published in January 2014 by David B. Nicholas et al., covers 10 studies, and highlights the lack of scientific literature available. In September 2016, Yosheen Pillay and Charlotte Brownlow's review of Predictors of Successful Employment Outcomes for Adolescents with Autism Spectrum Disorders: a Systematic Literature Review, based on 297 articles, was published.

In May 2019, a new review of the scientific literature devoted entirely to factors promoting employment for autistic people, by Melissa Scott and her team, was published: it covered 134 studies of inclusion factors, 36 of which evaluated the effectiveness of employment interventions. The vast majority of these studies were carried out in the United States.

=== Targeted hiring experiments ===
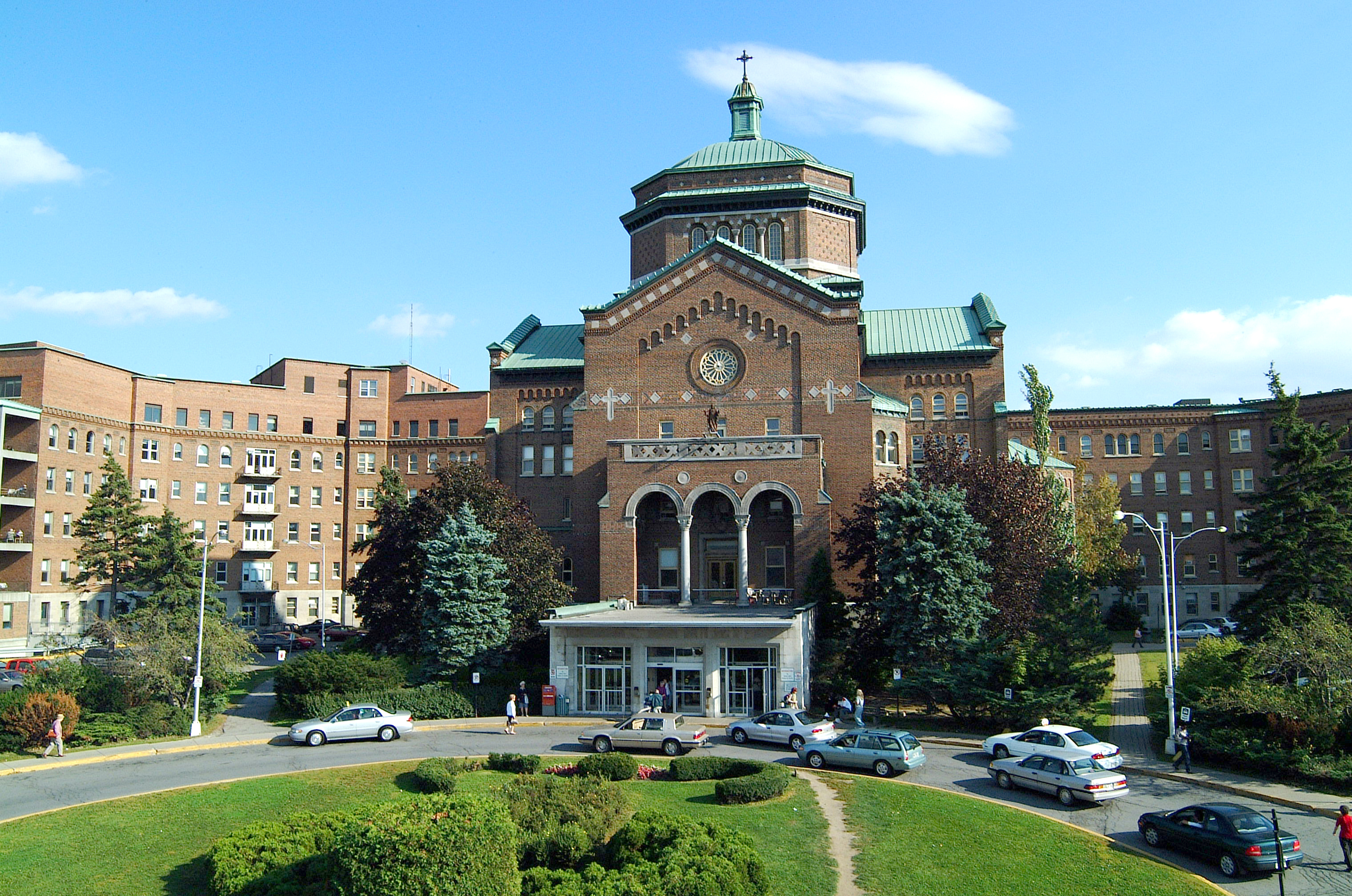
Hôpital du Sacré-Cœur de Montréal, part of the Université de Montréal, regularly employs autistic researchers.

Since the end of the 2000s a number of countries have launched plans to hire autistic people, not for medico-social reasons, but out of interest in their skills in specific tasks. The business model of structures specializing in the recruitment of autistic adults is based on the valorization of these skills enabled by neuroatypia. Autism is generally considered an asset by Silicon Valley employers. In Germany, Denmark, the United States and India, companies in the IT sector practice positive discrimination. Job coaching is on the increase, particularly in the Czech Republic, Germany, the US and Ireland. Meticulon in Canada, Auticon in Germany, and Asperger Syndrome Training Employment Partnership Entreprise in the USA, use job coaching with a single referent for the autistic employee. In Belgium, the "Passwerk" scheme, created in 2008, is based on intensive individual coaching for autistic employees.

In 2008, the AQA (Asperger Quality Assurance) project was launched in the suburbs of Tel Aviv, to enable the professional inclusion of high-performance autistic adults in the software testing field, targeting quality positions in multinational companies. The software testing and consulting company Specialisterne, which operates in 16 countries and is headquartered in Denmark, was founded by the father of an autistic child, and employs 70% autistic workers in adapted positions. In 2012, two Mossad agents launched the Ro'im Rachok project, an Israeli army intelligence unit that specifically recruits autistic teenagers to analyze aerial and satellite photographs. In 2013, the German software company SAP announced that it was looking for 650 autistic people for its research and development department, with the aim of having 1% autistic employees. In 2015, Microsoft announced the launch of a program to hire full-time autistic employees at its Redmond headquarters. In France, since 2014, the Andros group, supported by the Orange Foundation, has been taking on autistic employees at its Normandy plant. Most are nonverbal, and work part-time.

These targeted hirings through positive discrimination remain rare and isolated initiatives. They are not enough to remedy the underemployment of autistic people.

=== Generational effects and changes in the labor market ===
Generational effects must be taken into account when addressing this issue. Until the 1990s, the social and professional prognosis of autistic adults was generally very poor, with around three-quarters of them being institutionalized or dependent on their parents. Josef Schovanec notes that "adult autistic people suffer the failings of the education, health and more generally inclusion systems they experienced during their childhood [...] the sometimes devastating effects on the construction of the person of years of dropping out of school, of medical and social exclusion, often of great precariousness and marginality, when not of violence":

Any attempt to tackle the issue of employment for people with autism will have to take into account the fact that very few people with autism have had a linear life course. The dominant, and indeed almost unique, statistical norm in this field is the alternation of phases of greater or lesser inclusion, of various types of precariousness, with multiple interruptions of the pathway and long periods without a solution. – Josef Schovanec, Rapport présenté à la Secrétaire d'État chargée des personnes handicapées et de la lutte contre l'exclusion sur le devenir professionnel des personnes autistes.

Structural changes in the job market (increasingly competitive and segmented), recruitment methods and prerequisites (linear careers, formalized recruitment, multiplication of intermediaries, computerized sorting by keywords in curriculum vitae (CVs), etc.) may have led to crowding-out effects, multiplying the difficulties autistic people have in gaining access to employment. It is likely that these difficulties have increased since 2000. The specific conditions that have enabled a certain number of autistic people to gain access to employment, and even to valued career paths (the possibility of co-optation, for example in research, the lesser weight of previous experience, etc.) are increasingly rare on the job market. Since ca. 2010, the proliferation of tests requiring social skills (such as behavioral interview questions) created yet another obstacle on the path to employment for autistic people.

In addition, knowledge of autism among business leaders and employers in general is evolving, and strongly influences employability. In the United States in 2016, most business leaders, especially women, spontaneously associate autism with qualities of concentration and attention at work.

Disintermediation (development of employment platforms) is opening up new ways of organizing work, of objectifying and valuing skills, making it possible to explore a number of experiments better suited to disabled people, and in particular to the profile of autistic people. For example, telecommuting jobs are likely to become increasingly common in the coming years.

According to Tibor N. Farkas and his colleagues, hiring and keeping a job are the main challenges associated with integrating autistic people into the workplace, due to their communication and social skills deficits.

== Statistics ==
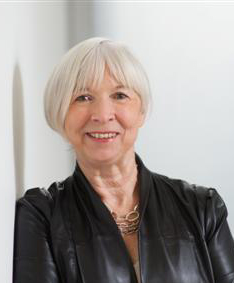
Psychology professor Patricia Howlin has studied the employment prospects of autistic people.

Autistic adults at all levels of autonomy experience periods of unemployment and underemployment. Overall, they are paid less than their non-autistic peers (whether due to a lower number of hours or a difference in the amount of pay for an equivalent position), work below their actual level of qualification or skills, and suffer more discrimination.

There are three main types of accessible employment: the ordinary or "competitive" environment, without specific support; the ordinary environment with specific support and/or accommodation; and the so-called "protected", "non-competitive" or "specific" environment (long-term employment reserved for disabled people, such as the Établissements et services d'accompagnement par le travail – ESAT – in France). The majority of employed autistic young adults work on a daily basis in sheltered environments (2012). These sheltered environments thus play a major role in the issue of autistic employment.

According to the NAS, in the UK, 79% (2009) to 77% (2017) of retired or unemployed autistic adults say they want to work, so the desire to find a job is on the whole "common".

Among the Swedish Autism community, two major reactions to employment stand out: one that views autism from a medical angle, as a health problem hindering employability, and which constitutes the slightly dominant view; another that calls for recognition of the particularities of autistic workers in the non-autistic context, and appeals to the social model of autism to demand adaptations to employment conditions.

=== Diploma levels ===
The educational levels of autonomous autistic people outside institutions is much lower to those of the non-autistic population, with a few cases of "over-educated" adults. This is a major root cause of autistic unemployment as autistics drop out of secondary education and higher education at a much higher rate than their non-autistic peers. There is a general attraction to study, but a frequent tendency to drop out of training courses to become self-taught, due to inadequacies with expectations. Diploma level is clearly correlated with employability. Autistic people placed in specialized institutions are very poorly qualified, due to the inaccessibility of training. Dawn Hendricks and British psychology professor Patricia Howlin, among others, have shown that prospects for young autistic school leavers are very limited, both in comparison with the general population and with adults with other developmental disorders. These low employment rates during the transition to adulthood show no improvement over time.

=== Employment rates ===
The United Nations estimated a general employment rate of around 20% in 2015. Across Europe, according to estimates by the Autism Europe collective of associations, between 76% and 90% of autistic people were unemployed in 2014. There are no official general (international) statistics on employment rates for autistic adults, only statistics by subgroup. In France (in 2017), there are no reliable data; the CNSA estimated (2016), on the basis of the synthesis carried out by the Haute Autorité de santé in 2010, that 56% of autistic adults can work part-time for five hours a week on average, and that between 1% and 10% have full-time work.

According to a review of the scientific literature by researchers Alissa Levy and Adrienne Perry, published in 2011, an average of 24% of autistic people find employment during their lifetime, usually on a discontinuous and/or part-time basis. The jobs concerned are low-paid and unrewarding. According to the NAS, the employment rate in the UK was 32% across all job types in 2017, of which 16% was full-time, a relatively stable rate since 2007. According to Damian Milton (at the NAS Study Day, 7 May 2015), only 15% of a sample of 2,000 autistic people surveyed in the UK were in full-time paid employment. In the US, a study of 72 autistic adults over 12 years shows that only just under 25% kept a job for the entire period, while three-quarters found employment over at least a short period.

Two phenomena create selection biases. Some people in employment are unaware that they are autistic, particularly women. Others have the wrong diagnosis (infantile psychosis...), or have a diagnosis but refuse to communicate it, and/or hide their behavioral particularities from their colleagues and employers: 9% of the 99 people in employment interviewed for a Malakoff Médéric survey in 2015 said they told no one that they were autistic; only 26% informed their superiors and colleagues.

The review by Scott et al. (2019) cites the following summary figures:

Country	Estimated employment rate, all types combined	Estimated full-time employment rate
Australia	42%	
United States	58% (among 15–25-year-olds)	21%
France	Estimate of 0.5% in mainstream settings (disputed by CNSA data); rate unknown	
United Kingdom	34%	15%

In the United States, around half (53.4%) of autistic young adults worked after leaving school (2011 figures), this rate being the lowest among disability groups. Michael Bernick and Richard Holden (2015) estimate that the overall unemployment rate for autistic Americans is between 60% and 70%.

=== Unemployment factors ===
Behavioral characteristics distinguish autistic people who remain employed from those who do not, with women having more difficulty finding employment than men. An American study of 254 autistic adults showed that those who disclosed their diagnosis to their employer were three times more likely to be hired than those who did not.

The employment rate is better for people with social and conversational skills. The unemployment rate for autistic people diagnosed with an intellectual disability is around 3 times higher. However, a more recent study (2018) based on the follow-up of a Utah cohort since the 1980s, tends to invalidate the relationship between IQ score and employment rate, and to conclude that lack of mastery of social skills is the main factor in unemployment. Similarly, according to Laurent Mottron, in North America (2011), around 10% of autistic people cannot speak and 90% have no regular employment, 80% of autistic adults remain dependent on their parents; yet only a minority have an associated neurological disorder that diminishes intelligence (e.g. fragile X syndrome).

== Accessibility and employment benefits ==
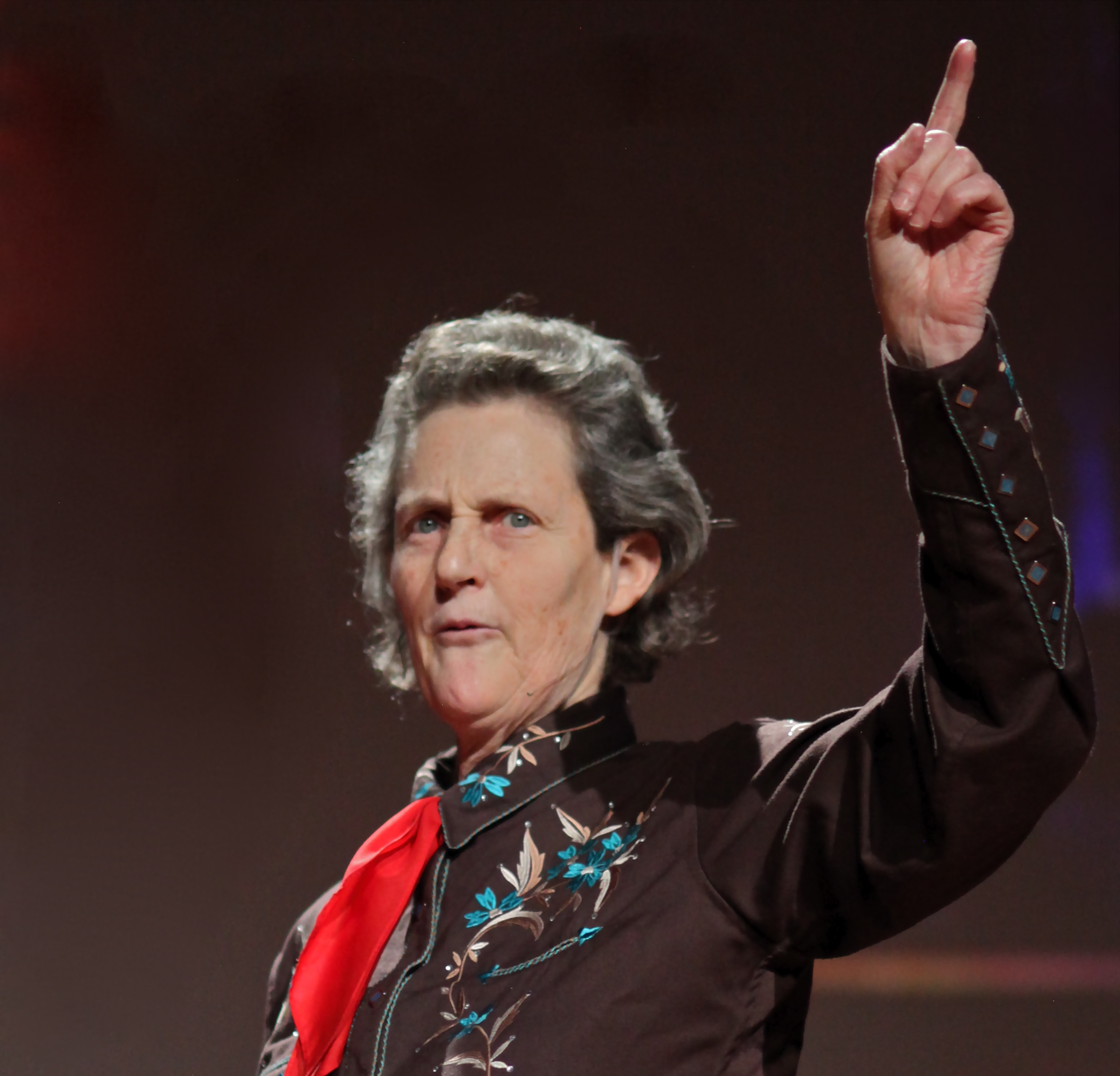
Temple Grandin (pictured here in 2010) has identified common characteristics in successful autistic people.

Like non-autistic people, autistic adults feel the need to be useful to society, and to experience a sense of comfort. However, there are differences in expectations between autistic and non-autistic people: the absence of a circle of friends may be experienced as problematic by a non-autistic person, but not by an autistic person. In France, the collective report by the Haute Autorité de santé (HAS) and the Agence nationale de l'évaluation et de la qualité des établissements et services sociaux et médico-sociaux (ANESM) recommends (2018) providing access to "activities likely to foster self-esteem and social recognition for all adults with autism, particularly those who are far from employment". A job tends to improve quality of life and cognitive performance, while constituting a means of integration. Conversely, lack of employment has negative repercussions in terms of socio-economic status, mental health and quality of life. With the increase in ASD diagnoses, access to employment for those affected is becoming a major social issue, especially as the difficulties encountered are unique and specific to ASD. The transition to adulthood is often a difficult period, a source of anxiety and uncertainty. The need for employment support is mainly due to the attitude of the training and employment sectors towards the particularities of autistic people. However, some autistic people cannot be integrated into the workplace.

There is generally no legal obligation to mention a diagnosis of autism on a CV. The financial compensation granted to disabled people, depending on the rules of the country concerned and the type of benefit, may require that a ceiling of resources not be exceeded: as a result, a number of autistic adults work in voluntary jobs.

In October 2015, Australian researcher Melissa Scott and her team published in PLOS One a study of 40 autistic adults in the context of their work, and 35 employers: according to them, the majority of autistic adults are able to hold down a job. These jobs can be in mainstream or sheltered settings, in competitive or non-competitive sectors.

Temple Grandin cites three common characteristics of successful autistic people:

- Having had the opportunity to develop their strengths, with support to do so
- Being helped during adolescence and early adulthood to work on social skills, including understanding human relationships in employment
- Taking medication or adapting eating and exercise habits to manage sensory problems, and associated disorders such as depression and anxiety

=== Selective advantages ===
The disability status of autistic adults is accompanied by selective advantages in the performance of specific tasks, particularly those involving visual skills, resulting in higher performance. There is an "ample level of evidence" in favor of the potential benefit to companies of hiring autistic people on tasks that mobilize their strengths, such as problem-solving, attention to detail, precision, memory, technical skills, or factual and detailed knowledge of specialized fields. However, in employers, the dominant view is based on the medical model of autism, which sees it as a sum of deficits:

This predominance of the medical model, or one based on interventions aimed solely at compensating for deficiencies, leads to an unbalanced vision of autism as a sum of deficits that must be compensated for in order to gain access to employment. This paradigm prevents us from seeing the skills developed by people with autism. – Melissa Scott et al.

Autistic adults often develop an intense and enduring interest in a specialized field. These interests can be varied, and knowledge is most often acquired by self-teaching. Computer science and language learning are two common interests of adults in mainstream settings, and are complemented by a wide range of activities in fields such as psychology, music, accountancy, drawing, geography, law, photography, cooking and mathematics. Autistic adults make, and have made, many contributions to the economy, but these contributions are not very visible, as they are usually made discreetly and anonymously.

Stephen Shore, PhD, points to a tendency towards routines as an advantage, resulting in better adherence to schedules and less absenteeism due to illness. A number of studies underline this less frequent absenteeism among the autistic population, as well as a general tendency for employers to recognize qualities of confidence and reliability in their autistic employees, particularly on repetitive tasks requiring a high level of concentration. Autistic workers are also recognized for their seriousness, perfectionism, punctuality and ability to meet deadlines.

Situations of loneliness and social isolation are not generally experienced as distressing by autistic adults, unlike their non-autistic peers. A lack of interest in socializing can also be an advantage within a company, as an autistic worker may not waste time socializing with colleagues during working hours.

These potential skills of autistic adults are often overlooked by the professional world, although they are invaluable on the job market.

=== Conditions for success ===
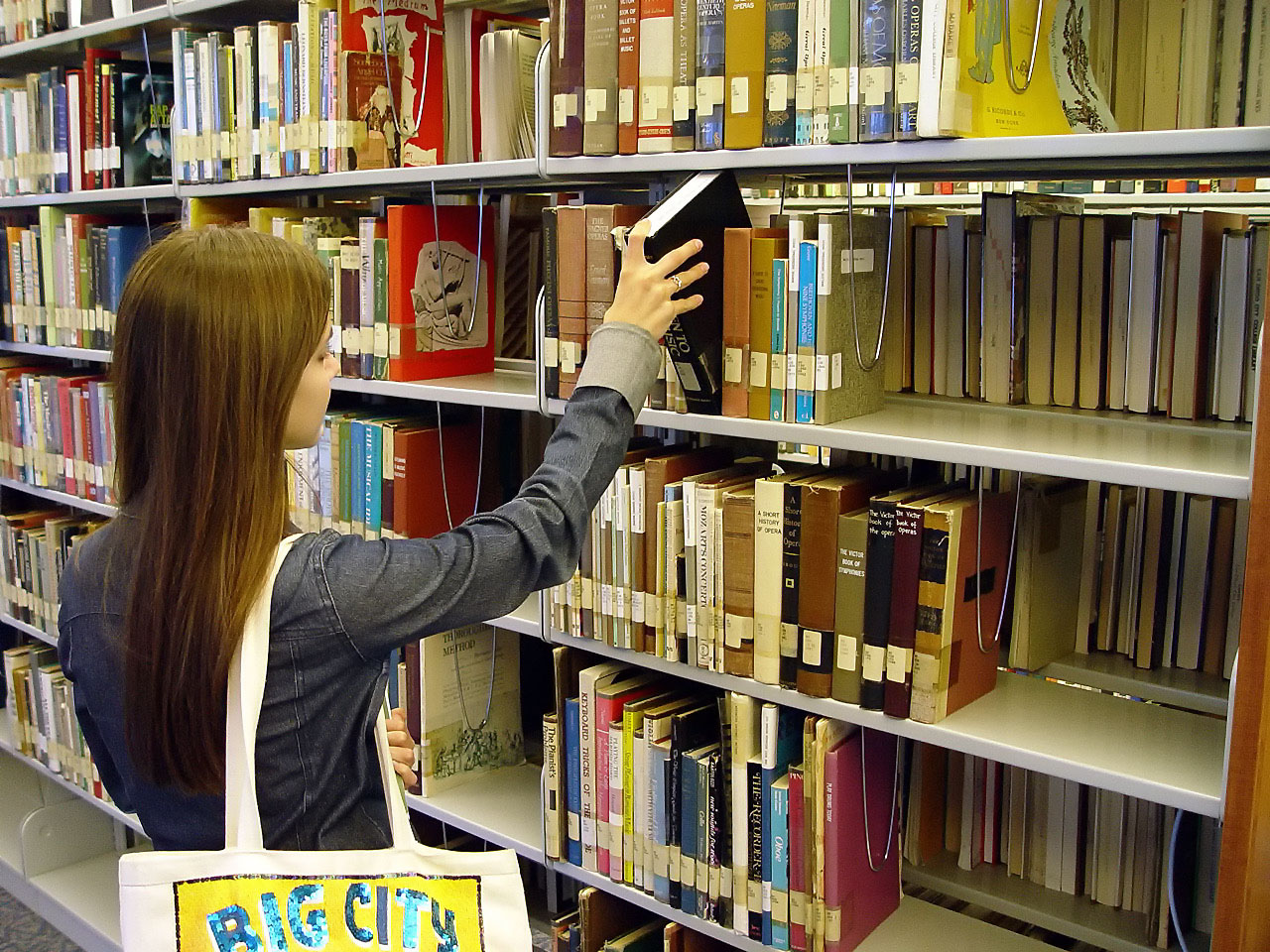
Library professions attract many autistic people.

In 2013, a group of Dutch researchers published an analysis of employment success factors for 563 people who were autistic or had attention deficit hyperactivity disorder: the three main factors were independent living (alone or with a partner, outside specialized institutions), community support, and motivation to find and hold the job in question. In fact, autistic people from affluent families, who have benefited from counseling and support, are statistically the most likely to access rewarding employment. Temple Grandin and Stephen Shore consider it important to maintain a link between interests and activity, and to enable autistic people to obtain employment in these areas of interest. Josef Schovanec qualifies this observation, as some autistic people have no apparent interests, or change their interests over the course of their lives. The HAS and ANESM recommend relying on centers of interest for employment support, unless they are too invasive.

Working in an autism-friendly environment is widely recognized as being more efficient and a source of greater satisfaction for autistic people than working in a non-autism-friendly environment.

As pointed out by Dominique Donnet-Kamel and Patrick Chambres, of the Association pour la recherche sur l'autisme et la prévention des inadaptations, telecommuting jobs offer many advantages for autistic people (familiar surroundings, choice of working hours, reduced social pressure, alternating between working at home and in the workplace). The social and voluntary sector is also an ideal area for integration into employment. Companionship can be adapted, but often poses the problem of living in a community. Finally, there are some notable cases of successful careers following a geographical move away from the person's place of origin.

==== Fields of activity ====
The idea that only a restricted range of occupations is possible for autistic people is a widespread prejudice. The jobs that can be performed are varied, from "basic" to highly technical positions. There are many career opportunities, even in self-employed jobs, although the latter are more specifically suited to the most independent autistic people. Cultural factors create differences in the way professions are practised in different countries. In the Anglo-Saxon world, for example, autistic people are well known to work in the stock market and in accounting, but this is not the case in France. Misrepresentations associated with certain professions, such as diplomacy, perpetuate the idea that careers are inaccessible to autistic people. The ideal job is in a field requiring few social skills, allowing time for learning, involving a reduced amount of sensory stimulation, and in which the tasks to be accomplished are clearly defined.

There is a comparatively high rate of interest and hiring in IT professions, which has led to the misconception that this sector is suitable for all autistic people. According to Josef Schovanec, most autistic people are not interested in IT, or struggle to make a living from it when it is their focus. The high-tech sector is the best covered in terms of solutions offered to autistic adults in various developed countries, despite its mismatch with expressed career wishes. Temple Grandin points out that many autistic computer scientists have made major contributions to this sector. According to Michael Bernick and Richard Holden (2018), the majority of available, suitable positions are not in high-tech, but in the "practical economy".

The military sector has a long tradition of welcoming atypical profiles; the Ro'im Rachok project (2013) played a pioneering role in professional inclusion in Israel. It is possible that some past Russian army programs have been conducted with autistic people, although this remains speculative. The hotel and catering industry is also open to atypical profiles. Translation-editing jobs, which are often in demand, are well suited to autistic adults, as they require solitary, highly technical work, with some flexibility in terms of working hours. Careers in contact with nature, plants and animals (horticulture, equestrianism, etc.) are among the most common interests, with individual examples of autistic farmers and breeders in the media. The best-known example is that of a zootechnician and doctor in animal science, Temple Grandin. The arts and crafts professions, which "have in common the need for high precision of gesture and great patience in often solitary work", also attract a significant proportion of autistic people, without requiring "advanced social or verbal skills". The same is true of the mechanical professions. A significant proportion of autistic people want to work in libraries, but this desire is rarely in line with the reality of the profession and the number of positions available. There are career opportunities in the autism sector itself, both in France and in the English-speaking world, among other things to ensure that autistic people are represented before public authorities. For some highly qualified autistic adults, higher education and research are sometimes the only career options. Solitary occupations and lifestyle choices have historically provided refuge for autistic adults, such as shepherding, monasticism and asceticism, a lifestyle with no social contacts and many routines.

Certain sectors are notoriously unsuitable for autistic profiles. Grandin, for example, advises against jobs in political science, commerce and positions involving regular use of the telephone, because of the problems of sensory overload and over-solicitation of social skills.

A 2024 study of 1115 employed autistic adults in the Netherlands found, that they were substantially more likely (than the non-autistic adults) to work in the healthcare & welfare sector, internet technology, military, as well as the public and charity sector. On the other hand, autistic employees were under-represented in economics & finances and industry & construction sectors. Almost equal proportions across both populations were found in education, service providers, hospitality, and science sectors; as well as in the creative, cultural, and entertainment sector.

== Explanations for difficulties ==
The difficulties encountered by autistic people on the job market have multiple explanations, linked among other things to communication and social interactions with employers and colleagues, to their sensory hypersensitivities, but also to a work environment unsuited to their disability, and to a lack of understanding of autism on the part of potential employers, who tend to focus on the person's "deficits" without seeing their strengths. Very few studies take into account the role played by environmental factors in limiting access to employment, even though the social model of disability should take precedence over the medical model in this context. The unemployment rate does not seem reducible without taking this social aspect into account on the employer's side. The level of qualification is less often cited as a limiting factor than problems of communication and organization in the workplace, in particular the unsuitability of the environment and equipment.

According to Temple Grandin and American activist Rudy Simone, the biggest difficulty encountered is not in learning the job itself, but in managing the particularities of ASD, including obsessions, stereotypies and rituals, motor difficulties (apraxia), task-planning difficulties due to working memory functioning in autism, and other associated disorders, such as the possibility of depression or bipolar disorder.

The frequent refusal of autistic adults to communicate about their autism in the workplace leads to a lack of support and awareness measures, as well as misinterpretation of their behavior, resulting in integration failures. The profile of autistic adults is often destabilizing for their colleagues and employers. The popular association between autism and childhood delays consideration of the phenomenon: "employment and adult life are not traditionally part of the vision of autism and therefore cannot be priorities".

The argument commonly used to justify the underemployment of disabled people – lack of skills – does not always apply to the employment of autistic people. A review of the scientific literature shows that the autistic adults most rejected from employment are in fact those with the most behavioural problems. Furthermore, there are no leadership skills that are particularly expected by all autistic people, as each individual may have a particular sensitivity and a different appreciation of these qualities. The curricula followed by autistic people are not always the same.

The curricula followed by autistic people are often linked to their interests, which are not very compatible with the reality of the job market. The results of the study by Scott and his team (2015) show that, although both groups (employees and employers) appear to be engaged in an employment process, there is a difference in understanding of the type of workplace support required, expectations and productivity requirements, which hinders the autistic person's success in employment. According to the authors, "these findings highlight the need to facilitate communication between employees and employers to ensure a clear understanding of the needs of both groups". Finally, the cost of employment support measures can be an obstacle, as autistic people are considered to be one of the most expensive groups in terms of the support required.

=== Blocking the job interview ===
Employment rate for autistic adults generally is low, lower than of other disability groups. According to 2020 UK data, only 21.7% of autistic adults had any kind of job. Similar findings were reported in earlier studies by other researchers. Furthermore, around 46% of those, who are employed, are over-qualified for their current role.

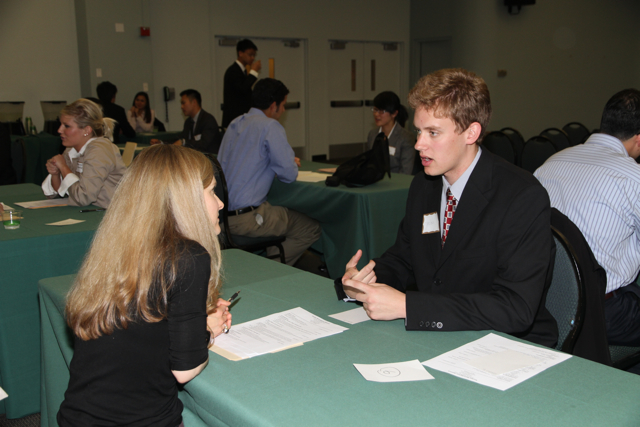
Job interviews, based on social skills, are particularly discriminating for autistic adults.

The job interview is cited as probably "the most difficult part of the job search for people with autism", and negative perception of autistic candidates by non-autistic interviewers is frequently cited as a major barrier to gaining employment for autistic adults.

According to the Malakoff Médéric survey, job interview "appears to be a highly discriminating barrier for an autistic person who does not play well the social comedy attached to this rite of passage. They fail the psychological tests, whose pitfalls they rarely avoid". More specifically, autistic candidates are "perceived as having a more monotonous tone of voice, being less composed and focused, and displaying less natural eye contact and gestures than their non-autistic counterparts, and received lower ratings for likelihood of social approach".

According to Josef Schovanec, job interviews are difficult, if not impossible, to pass for autistic people, because the judgement is based not on the possession of the skills required for the job, but on the respect of social codes (politeness, dress, hairstyle...) during the interview, which is a point of difficulty common to all autistic people. In the majority of countries, autistic adults who have gained access to the desired positions have done so by cooptation, without undergoing a job interview. Prior training helps to prepare for the questions asked at this type of interview, and improves the chances of success.

In addition, autism is frequently misunderstood by human resources departments in France, for instance because of confusion with schizophrenia.

=== Social skills ===
Among the major challenges posed by autism are the management of social skills and friendships, communication difficulties (particularly in holding and managing conversations), and difficulties in guessing the desires and thoughts of others (theory of mind). Social relationships are a major factor in job rejection, and a major source of stress for autistic workers. As Brett Heasman (PhD) points out, the phenomenon of misunderstanding is bilateral: while autistic adults often misinterpret the intentions of their employers and colleagues, the latter also often misinterpret the autistic worker's intentions, for example by falsely attributing selfish intentions. An autistic person may unintentionally come across as rude to colleagues or lack diplomacy. Managing hierarchy at work is problematic, as is the lack of understanding of relationships between employees, particularly when it comes to competition. Some 80% of autistic adults interviewed for the Malakoff Médéric survey said they felt uncomfortable in a group.

Job promotion can be unwanted and detrimental, as it often includes the need to supervise or manage work groups, skills that are notoriously among the weak points of autistic workers. In the worst case, autistic workers may attempt to kill themselves after a promotion that leads to a change in their type of activity, if they find themselves distanced from the task they used to enjoy. The evolution of certain economic sectors has been to their detriment, including IT, which increasingly requires more advanced social skills. Recruiters are often surprised by the profile of highly qualified autistic people, since companies also expect them to have good social and managerial skills.

Temple Grandin stresses the need to teach autistic people not to criticize their colleagues and superiors, and to work on their organizational skills. She also believes it is important to make colleagues and superiors aware of the social difficulties faced by autistic people. Sandrine Gille, a woman diagnosed with Asperger syndrome and high intellectual potential in adulthood, testifies to her difficulties in employment, emphasizing the compensation and imitation strategies put in place: "What seemed so natural, self-evident, in the way I communicated with colleagues, hierarchy and other social subtleties, appeared to me as a whole universe to decode and work on, a form of mimicry to put in place so that I could appear to 'be as natural as possible' and not put myself in danger". She also insists on acceptance by the professional world: "accepting that a person who presents with a pervasive developmental disorder can turn out to be an excellent collaborator, if you take the time to understand and accept him as he is".

=== Emotional dysregulation ===
Difficulties in managing emotions such as anger, anxiety and depression are frequently linked to autism. Stress at work is very common, with almost all autistic workers testifying to experiencing and being easily placed in such stressful situations, particularly by the unexpected. Socializing with non-autistic peers is also a source of stress. A problem with delayed public transport can trigger a panic attack, or absence from work. This stress at work is known to generate self-harm. One of the main factors in the failure to integrate so-called high-functioning autistic people is the disruption of their routines.

Sensitivity to the unexpected often translates into strong reactions to interruptions during a task requiring concentration, in around half of autistic workers. Half of autistic workers also report having experienced at least one burn-out.

=== Sensory disorders ===
According to Temple Grandin, most autistic people who encounter major employment problems in adulthood suffer specifically from sensory hypersensitivities with these sensory disorders being a factor in job loss. The Malakoff Médéric Foundation survey emphasizes (2015) that "sensory aspects are essential to take into account for the success and sustainability of inclusion in employment": three-quarters of the 99 autistic workers surveyed said they had hypersensitivities to noises, smells, taste or touch. Autistic people may also be disturbed by certain visual perceptions. These hypersensitivities lead to significant fatigue at work, particularly due to the effort required to adapt. Most autistic workers say they cannot work properly in an open-plan layout, mainly because of the ambient noise in these workspaces, and would prefer an individual office.

On the other hand, some autistic people have hyposensitivities, associated with self-regulatory behaviours, or present both hyper- and hyposensitivities, which can result, in the same person, in a refusal of tactile contact and a need for physical movement.

=== Motivation and different perceptions of hardship ===
The employment wishes and aspirations of autistic adults are often overlooked, due to the low number of accessible jobs. Autistic people's preferences and expectations at work can be radically different from those of non-autistic people. In the general population, motivating factors at work are based on salary and bonuses, the prospect of promotion supported by the symbolism of power, and social benefits in terms of leisure and festive encounters. Sometimes, none of these motivating factors work for an autistic person, leading to dismissal. Autistic profiles are generally not attracted by positions of responsibility or power.

The drudgery of work may be experienced differently than by non-autistic peers: in France, night work and repetitive work, which come under the legal definition of "arduous work", may be experienced as less arduous for an autistic worker than other situations that do not fall under this definition, such as unpredictability in employment and working in a socially-charged environment. Autistic adults generally prefer jobs that include a certain amount of routine.

== Discrimination and injustice in employment ==
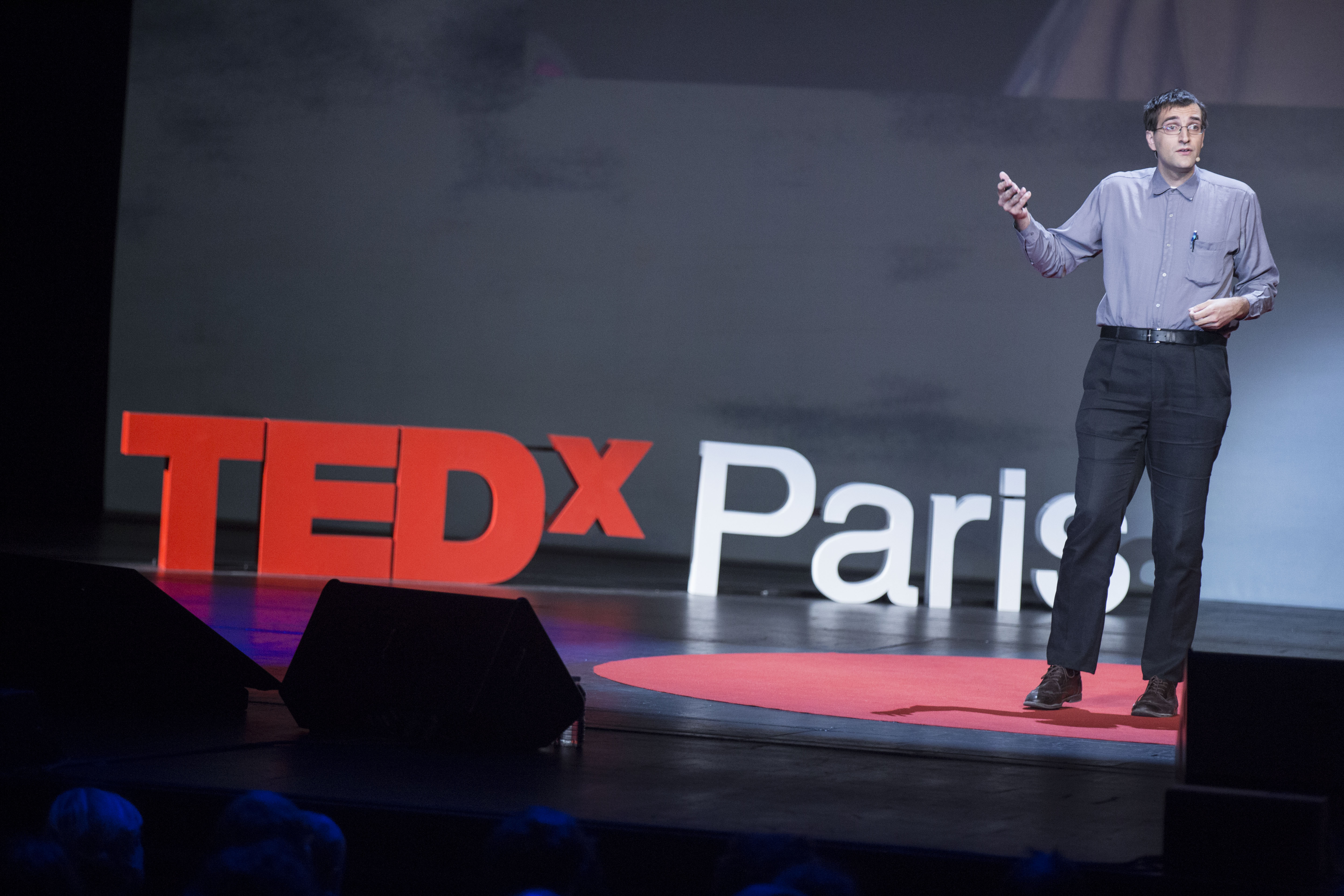
Josef Schovanec (EHESS), researcher and activist

According to Autisme Europe, stigmatization and discrimination are the biggest difficulties to overcome. According to Laurent Mottron, employers often assign autistic people to menial, repetitive tasks, without realizing what these people are capable of. The Malakoff Médéric Foundation notes that:

The employment of people with cognitive disabilities [...] has until now focused on activities that are particularly unrecognized, repetitive, with little economic potential, and no prospect of personal or professional advancement. Often, the choice of activity in question is made by the institution, not by the individual, and even less by the needs of the economy in general. The long-term deleterious effects of this are well known: demotivation, the need for heavy subsidies and exemptions from employment law to keep the activity afloat, the impossibility of personal fulfillment. – Malakoff Médéric, Foundation report

Temple Grandin notes that autistic people in low-skilled jobs are more likely to suffer discrimination and suffering at work than those in higher-status positions, since a certain eccentricity is tolerated in people considered to be talented. The latter may, however, arouse the jealousy of their colleagues. Social problems at work are very common. Moreover, the intersectionality of discrimination must be taken into account: in the United States, for example, white-skinned autistic people are more likely to find a job than black-skinned people. An analysis of employment discrimination complaints from disabled people in the United States shows that complaints from autistic adults are most numerous against the retail sector, and more often emanate from men, particularly from Native American ethnic backgrounds.

According to NAS data published in 2016, 43% of UK autistic people who are or have been in employment say they have lost a job due to autism-related discrimination. A further 81% say they have experienced harassment, injustice or lack of support in the workplace. In Italy, the law provides for disabled people to have access to employment, but in practice, the lack of protected positions makes integration very difficult, if not impossible: "And, if one of them, gifted with better communication and interpersonal skills, manages to complete his or her studies, get a diploma or a degree, he or she won't find a lasting job because no one will bother to recognize his or her characteristics and make, possibly, a small modification – in schedule or work setting – that makes life less difficult for such a fragile person in terms of interaction".

Employers and human resources managers generally fail to recognize that they are discriminating when they judge autistic people on their social skills, and justify their non-employment on the grounds of the severity of their disability. In the UK, if there is a suspicion of discrimination, it is advisable to ask precisely why a job was refused or lost. In the event of a trial, a judge will be able to assess whether these reasons are valid for the position in question, or whether the treatment of the autistic person amounts to discrimination. Autistic people in the workplace often have low self-esteem. Josef Schovanec (2017) identifies two stages of adult life "particularly worthy of attention": the early years after adolescence, associated with a floating phase; then a phenomenon of resignation observed from a certain age, to which "particularly gifted people whose talents have not been taken into account at all" would be prone.

=== Refusal to adapt position ===
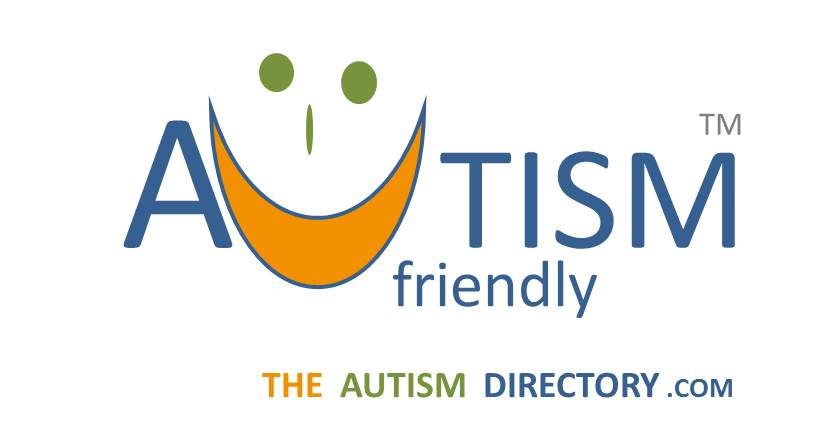
Autism Friendly sticker, indicating places accessible to autistic people.

Employers rarely take measures to adapt workstations. Specific adaptations for autistic people are often refused, such as an individual desk rather than an open-plan layout, keeping office doors closed, or moving away from an elevator, on the grounds that "everyone has to make an effort". Furthermore, little attention is paid to the fatigue of autistic people in workplaces ill-suited to their disability, despite the fact that some 80% of workers questioned for the Malakoff Médéric survey reported greater fatigue than non-autistic people. More than half of the autistic workers surveyed would like to work staggered hours, to avoid the presence of a large number of colleagues and crowded public transport.

A frequent problem is the gradual slackening of integration efforts after hiring, or the view that autistic people who are able to compensate for their disability at work do not need adaptations over time. Difficulties of accessibility and adaptability at the workstation are linked to the difficulty of providing access to autistic customers on the part of professionals (hairdressing, driving lessons, mass retailing in general), which is almost totally absent in France, whereas such access is provided in the Anglo-Saxon world.

=== Non-remuneration or exploitation ===
There have been reports of autistic workers being exploited by malicious colleagues or employers, as a result of their frequent naivety when it comes to human relations, particularly in the early years of adulthood. It is also widely accepted that jobs reserved for disabled people are paid less than those for able-bodied people.

A number of companies do not pay autistic people for their work, without explaining why, particularly freelancers. Josef Schovanec's report gives an estimate of around a third of unpaid work, in defiance of legal obligations, with autistic people notoriously reluctant to complain or threaten the companies in question. He testifies that he was a victim of bad practices in his early adult life, such as not being paid for his translations after they had been completed.

=== Beliefs associated with a presumed degree of autism ===
Although there is a great diversity of profiles among autistic people, the presence of an intellectual disability is much rarer than employers imagine. Rather, it is the absence of oral language skills that severely compromises the chances of professional success. The more outwardly "mild" a person's autism is considered to be, the greater their chances of obtaining a rewarding job. The latter most often concerns people diagnosed with Asperger syndrome or "high-functioning autism".

Josef Schovanec points to the existence of a "myth of the high-functioning autistic person", sustaining the belief in "a link between the alleged degree of autism and behavioral disorders". As an example, he cites the recruitment experience of the Andros group, which mainly recruited non-speaking autistic young adults, who were labelled "Asperger" as soon as they were hired. Potential employers tend to ask only for "Asperger" profiles, despite the fact that no research has shown any link between this former medical category and greater professional competence.

== Measures ==
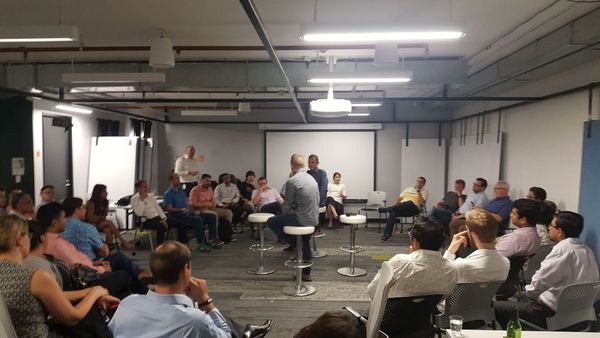
In-house coaching session

Successful integration into the workplace depends both on learning on the part of autistic workers, and on adaptations to their working conditions. Various measures are being tested, taking into account difficulties such as job interviews, autonomy and workstation adaptation. Employers in the UK are being encouraged to take autistic profiles into account, for example by not asking for communication skills if the job does not require them, and by avoiding assessing candidates on their social interactions during the job interview, to encourage integration into the job. In Germany (2012), a website exists to put employers in touch with each other who are looking for particular skills or profiles to which autistic people can respond. In the Netherlands, a similar scheme has been set up so that autistic jobseekers can create an online profile and receive support by highlighting their strengths. Josef Schovanec believes that autistic people need job coaching and training in the difficulties of working life. On the other hand, Temple Grandin stresses that the support offered by her teachers and those who taught her social skills was essential.

Dawn Hendricks insists on the need for job placement, i.e. a job search targeted at the person's interests and strengths. The passive medical focus on the deficits of autistic people often leads to blaming the individual for what he or she is, rather than adapting the environment and social organization to the disability. Interventions focused on deficits are useful for identifying areas of difficulty, but have little, if any, effect on finding and keeping a job:

Interventions for adults with autism should instead focus on identifying barriers and facilitators to job acquisition and mitigating their weaknesses by promoting and enhancing their strengths. – Melissa Scott et al.

Research has been carried out in the UK and Australia on the cost-return on investment of these measures. Over a period of eight years, employment support for people with high-functioning autism or Asperger syndrome in the UK yielded a profit. Specific measures for autistic people are more effective than general measures. The Australian survey of 59 employers also shows that these measures are beneficial for companies, and do not generate additional costs. States' commitment to the employment of autistic adults has an economic interest, by reducing recourse to social benefits, and increasing revenue from contributions and taxes. The socio-professional inclusion of autistic people is rarely the subject of action programs, to the extent that the existence of the problem remains unknown in the majority of countries.

=== Employment support ===
To encourage hiring and the retention of autistic people in employment, according to a Swiss Social Security survey (2015), the main lever is the creation of vocational guidance and training measures tailored to their specific needs. In particular, the study recommends the use of job coaching and case management schemes; the French CNSA also recommends job coaching. Job coaching programs generally target positions with very low levels of responsibility. There are few, if any, initiatives aimed at positions considered more prestigious. These supports (including JobTIPS, Individual Placement and Support (IPS), Autism: Building Links to Employment (ABLE) in Northern Ireland, American SEARCH projects42 and other programs66) generally prove their effectiveness, with success rates of up to 90%, although the precise success factors have yet to be identified. The effectiveness of this support is generally judged more positively by the employer than by the autistic people themselves and their families. They could be differentiated according to gender, as they seem to be more effective with men than with women; overall, there is less research on women than on men.

Increasing autonomy through occupational therapy appears to be highly beneficial. Peer emulation (discussion groups between autistic adults or between autistic and non-autistic adults) can also provide effective support. The role of the coach is to teach the autistic employee how to adapt to the rules and culture of the company. A social worker or workplace mentor may also be called in. On-the-job training is more effective than simulation. However, virtual job interview training (with computer support) seems to be effective; the use of video models to learn how to answer the phone can also be explored.

Numerous testimonies report the damaging use of pseudoscientific methods or vectors of sectarian aberrations in the field of business coaching, such as divinatory tarot, neuro-linguistic programming and transactional analysis. On 11 November 2012, the NGO Autism Rights Watch alerted MIVILUDES to the development of coaching in the healthcare field, and the persistence of unverified psychoanalytical theories targeting autistic people in France.

In France in 2015, the family circle and public organizations such as Pôle emploi and Cap emploi are the main "de facto" coaches for autistic adults engaged in a job search. Feedback from the latter two organizations is generally negative (2015), particularly with regard to the requirement for regular appointments, which generates stress and breaks in entitlements. Feedback from parallel systems specializing in autism, both in France and in England and Israel, is more positive. In India, autistic people benefit from employment support measures in the disability sector

The integration of autistic people into jobs can be supported by human resources management, whose role has evolved considerably to support the personal development of employees.

=== Adapting working conditions ===
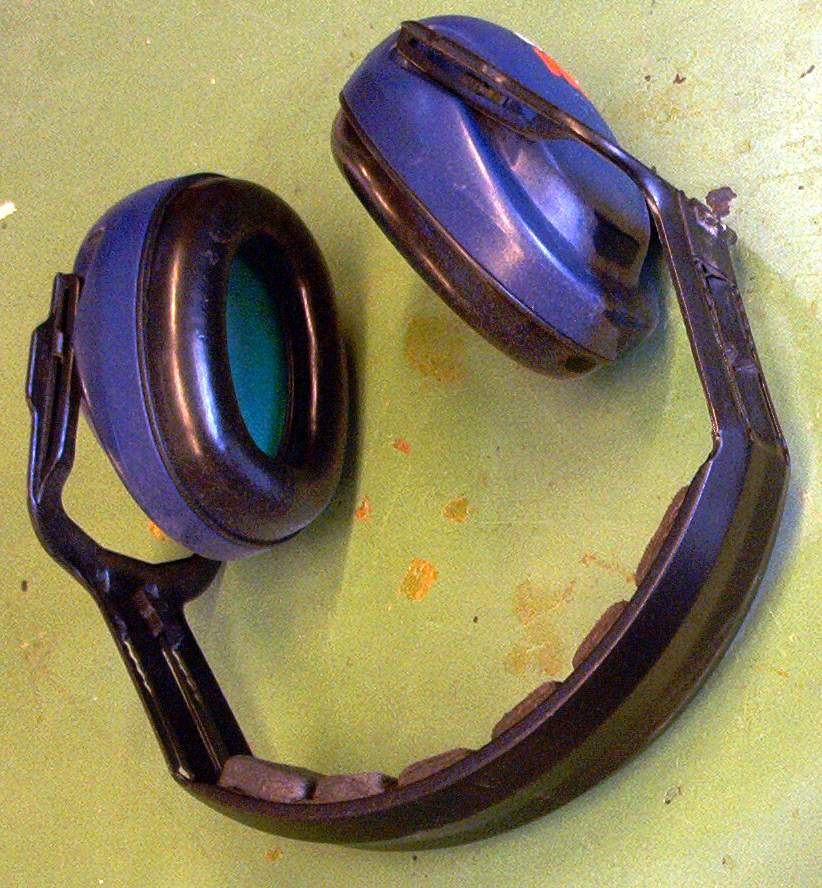
Several models of noise-canceling headphones are suitable for people with auditory hypersensitivities.

According to Temple Grandin, adapting a workstation to sensory hypersensitivity often requires little in the way of adaptations. It's possible to use noise-cancelling headphones, do away with shrill bells and neon lights, and use more written communication. A frequent request for adaptation is communication by e-mail rather than by telephone. The Malakoff Médéric foundation cites raising team awareness, adapting working hours and taking sensory aspects into account as three elements necessary for successful integration. For visual sensitivities, tinted glasses seem to be effective. Sensory aspects are taken into account in some countries (such as Denmark, where Specialisterne places autistic IT specialists in individual offices with adapted lighting) but not in others, notably France. In the United States, there are many items on sale specifically designed to help manage sensoriality, such as jackets exerting adjustable pressure on certain parts of the body.

Mutual understanding is easier if the tasks required are predictable, structured and clearly defined. The use of visual aids can be very beneficial. Various solutions (relaxation, medication) are available to manage anxiety. Anxiety and hypersensitivity are often linked. Managing emotions can be a challenge, particularly anger. On the other hand, many employment difficulties are solved by a good quality of sleep.

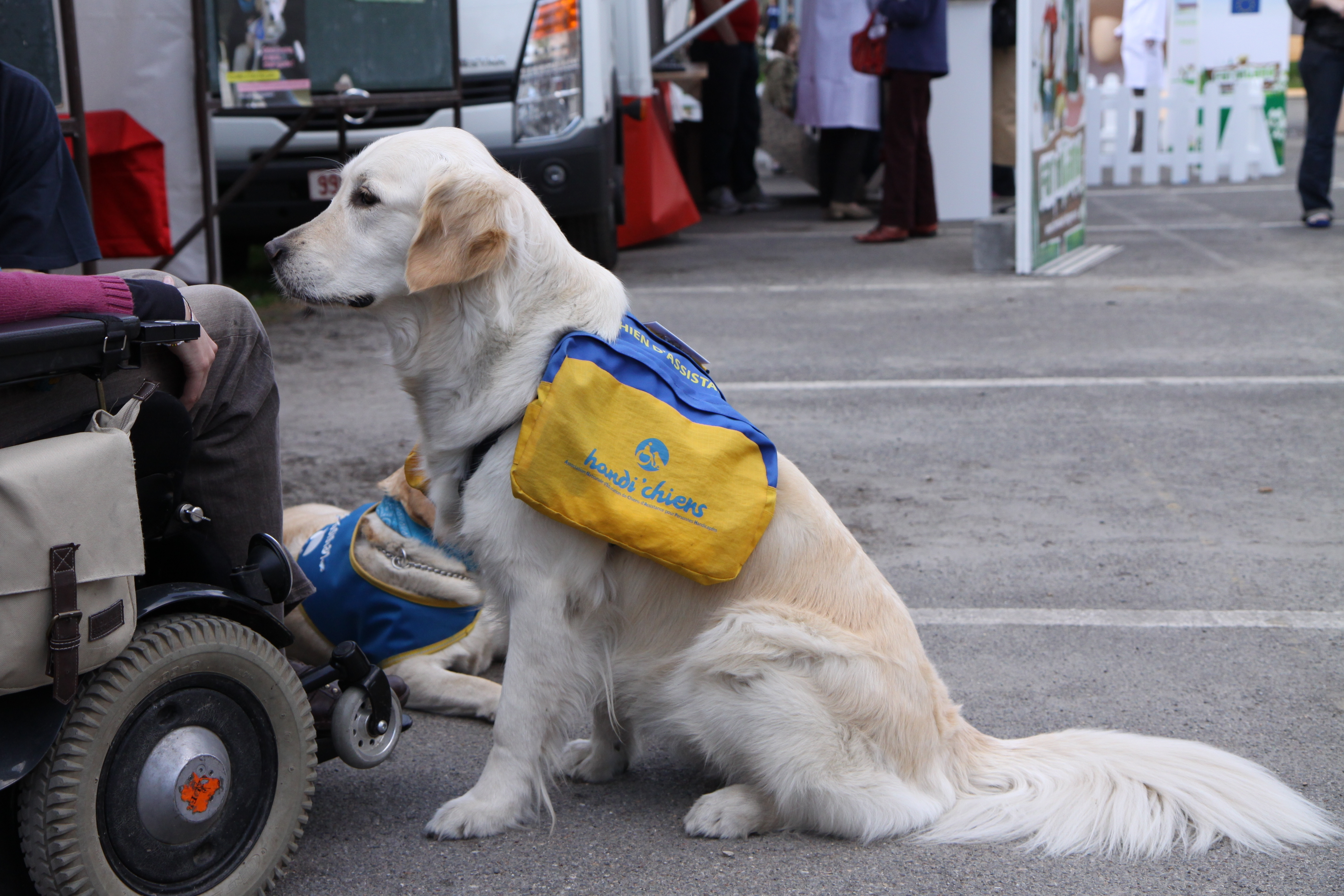
Assistance dog dedicated to helping people with physical or mental disabilities

A number of workstation adaptations are beneficial to disabilities other than autism, in particular the use of assistance dogs, which also concerns visual disabilities. Adaptations to working conditions can have a positive bilateral effect. For example, unlike the majority of non-autistic people, some autistic people prefer to work at night, and are therefore more productive.

== Media coverage ==
Hiring initiatives specifically targeting autistic people are very recent and generally generate enthusiasm and spontaneous support. They have received a certain amount of media coverage, creating a perceptual bias and a belief that the autistic employment issue has already been resolved.

There are also a number of TV series featuring autistic adults in prestigious professions. Benedict Cumberbatch, in his role as detective Sherlock Holmes in the 2010 BBC series Sherlock, makes explicit reference to Asperger syndrome. In the 2016 film The Accountant, the autistic main character (played by Ben Affleck) works as a forensic accountant. The Korean series Good Doctor (2013) and the American series The Good Doctor (2017) feature a young autistic surgeon (played by Joo Won in the Korean series and Freddie Highmore in the US series) who faces stigmatization and prejudice in his professional environment. The French-Belgian series AstraZeneca (2008) features a young autistic surgeon who has a very low self-esteem. The Franco-Belgian series Astrid et Raphaëlle (2019) has an autistic archivist (played by Sara Mortensen) working for the criminal investigation department as one of its two main characters.

== See also ==
- Discrimination against autistic people
- Neurodiversity and labor rights
- Supported employment
