= Autistic distinct anxiety =

Atypical anxiety symptoms in autistic people

Autistic distinct anxiety refers to anxiety symptoms in the context of autism that are not typically captured by standard DSM criteria for anxiety disorders. Autistic-specific anxiety includes unique triggers and responses not commonly observed in neurotypical individuals. These anxieties are often unique to individuals with ASD and can manifest as fears of change, uncommon phobias (e.g., specific sounds, facial features), and anxieties related to social confusion rather than just fear of negative evaluation. Co-occurring anxiety disorders and ASD in children is hard to diagnose due to overlapping symptoms of many anxiety disorders and ASD and the lack of appropriate diagnostic tools.

== Treatment ==
Treatment techniques for children with distinct anxiety have been studied insufficiently, mainly with male participants that are considered to have high-functioning ASD. There is either insufficient or inadequate research on treatment of distinct anxiety in children with lower IQs.

=== Psychological techniques ===
Cognitive-behavioral therapy (CBT) has shown to be most effective for management of anxiety symptoms in children with ASD, especially when adapted to the child rather than used in the fixed standard model. CBT requires a minimum level of functioning to be successful, which excludes children who experience major behavioral difficulties, coexisting or psychotic or mood disorders, or moderate to severe intellectual disabilities.

=== Medication ===
The little research done on pharmacological treatments for children with distinct anxiety has been inconclusive.
