= Monotropism =

Cognitive strategy in autism

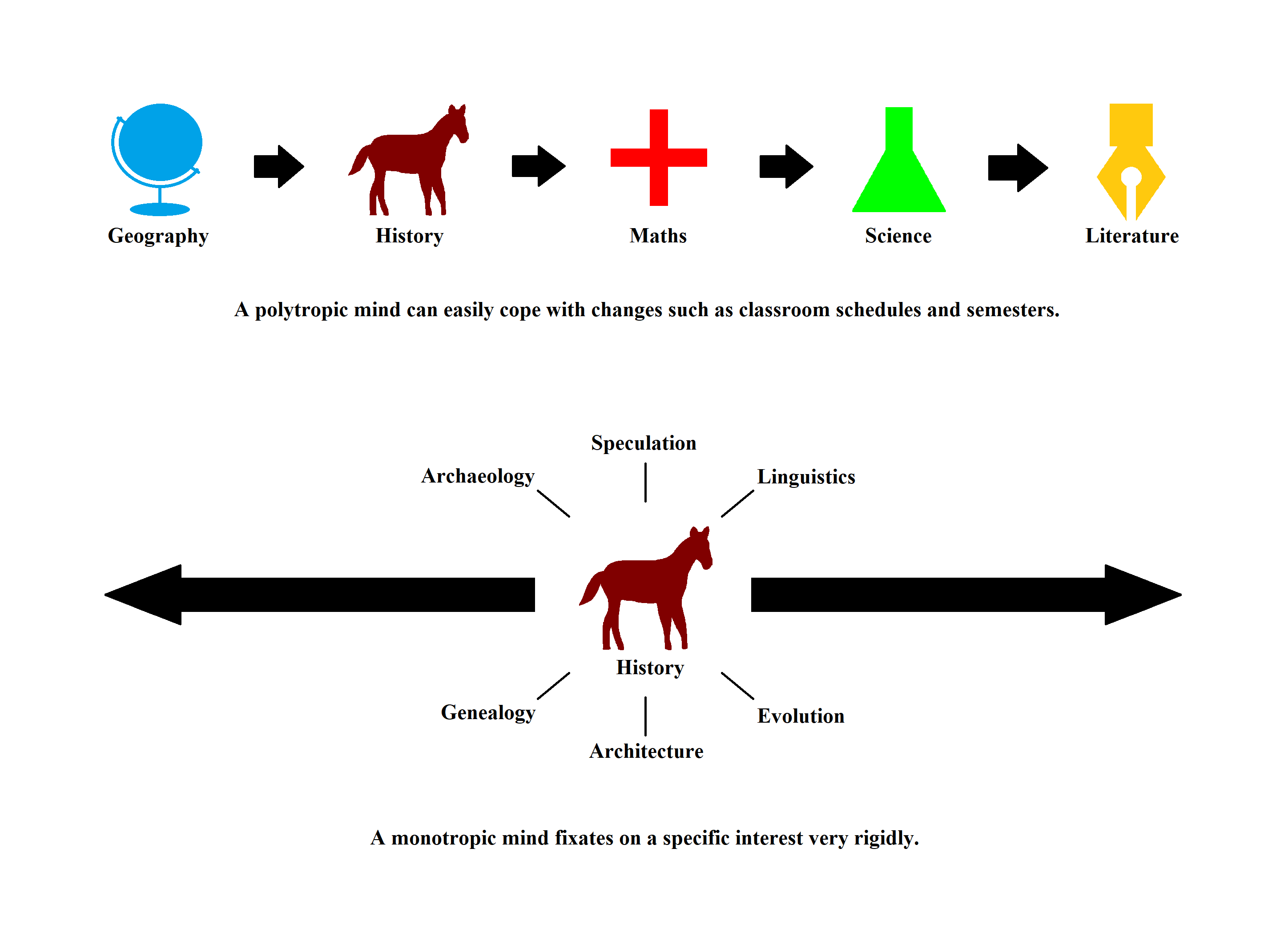
The differences between polytropism and monotropism

Monotropism is an individual's tendency to focus their attention on a small or singular number of interests at any time, with them neglecting or not perceiving lesser interests. This cognitive strategy has been posited as the central underlying feature of autism.

A tendency to focus attention tightly has a number of psychological implications, with it being seen as a state of "tunnel vision". While monotropism tends to cause people to miss things outside their attention tunnel, within it, their focused attention can lend itself to intense experiences, deep thinking, and, more specifically, flow states. However, this form of hyperfocus makes it harder to redirect attention, including starting and stopping tasks, leading to what is often described as executive dysfunction in autism, and stereotypies or perseveration, where a person's attention is repeatedly drawn back to the same subject or activity.

== Characteristics ==
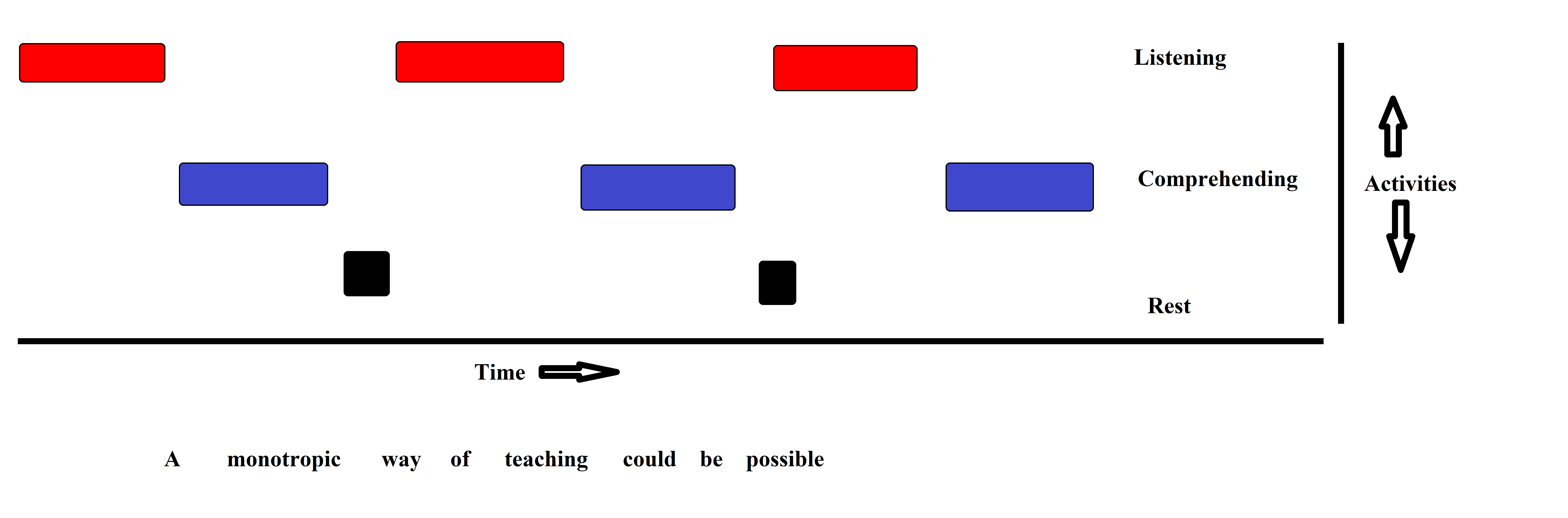
Monotropic way of teaching

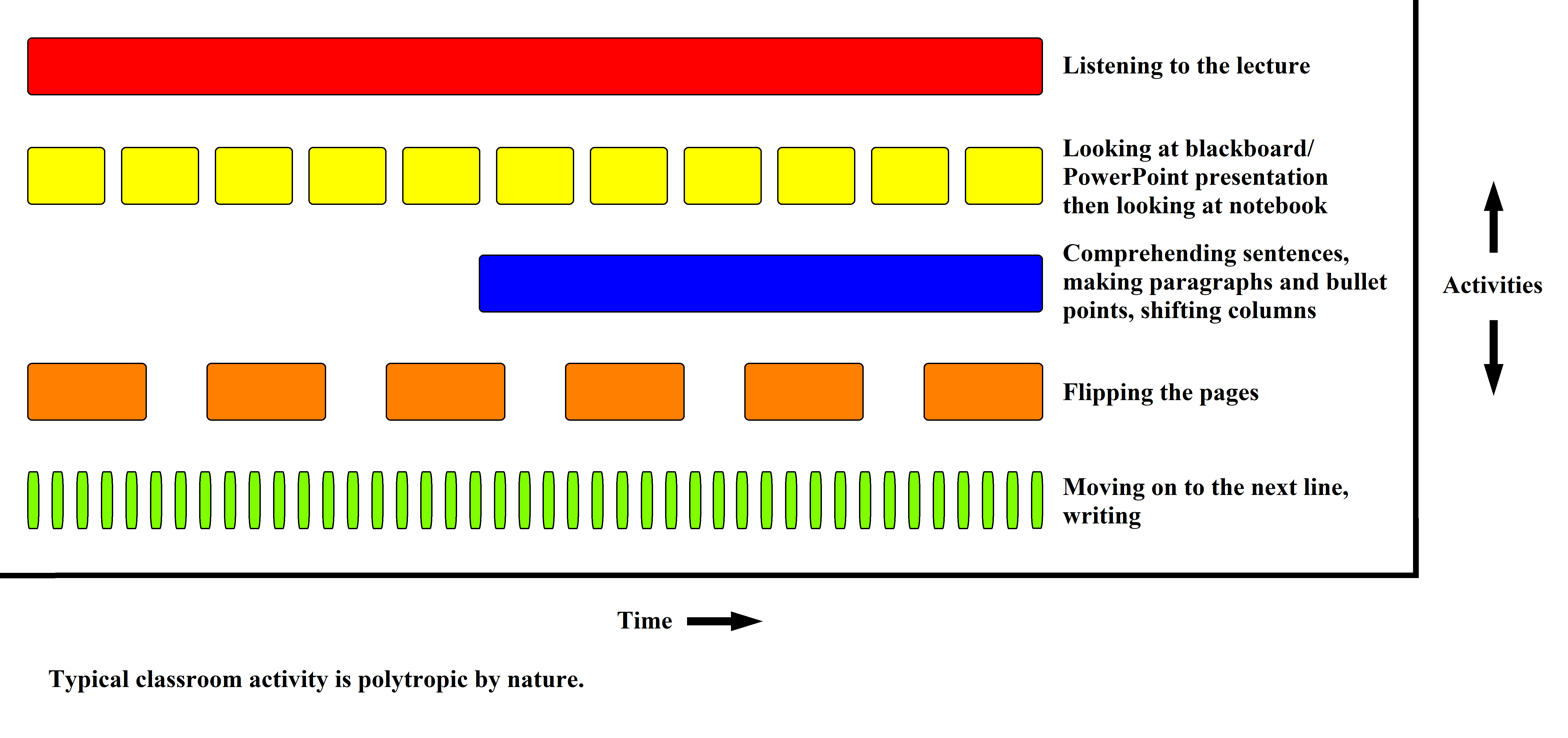
Typical classroom activity requires lot of polytropic processing of stimuli.

Since the amount of attention available to a person is limited, cognitive processes are forced to compete. In the monotropic mind, interests that are active at any given time tend to consume most of the available attention, causing difficulty with other tasks such as conventional social interaction. Language development can be affected, both through the broad attention required and the psychological impact of language, which provides a tool for others to manipulate a child's interest system.

Monotropic individuals have trouble processing multiple things at once, particularly when it comes to multitasking while listening. For example, some students have trouble taking notes in class while listening to a teacher and may find it difficult to read a person's face and comprehend what they are saying simultaneously. A common tendency is for individuals to avoid complex sensory environments because of this hypersensitivity. Monotropic individuals may suppress attention and focus on something else, or develop great depth in a given interest or skill.

== History ==
The term monotropism is attested in the context of autism since 1992. It appeared in a text by Dinah Murray and is said to have been suggested by Jeanette Buirski. The word mono ("one, single") here is chosen in contrast to poly ("many"); whereas -tropism points to "directional movement or growth" as in the biological concept of tropism.

The theory of monotropism was developed by Dinah Murray, Wenn Lawson, and Mike Lesser starting in the 1990s, and first published in 2005. Lawson's further work on the theory formed the basis of his PhD, Single Attention and Associated Cognition in Autism, and the book The Passionate Mind published in 2011.

== Implications for practice ==
Murray et al. (2005) proposed certain steps to help autistic individuals, such as increasing "connections", building understanding through the child's interests, and making connections between people and concepts more "meaningful and less complex".

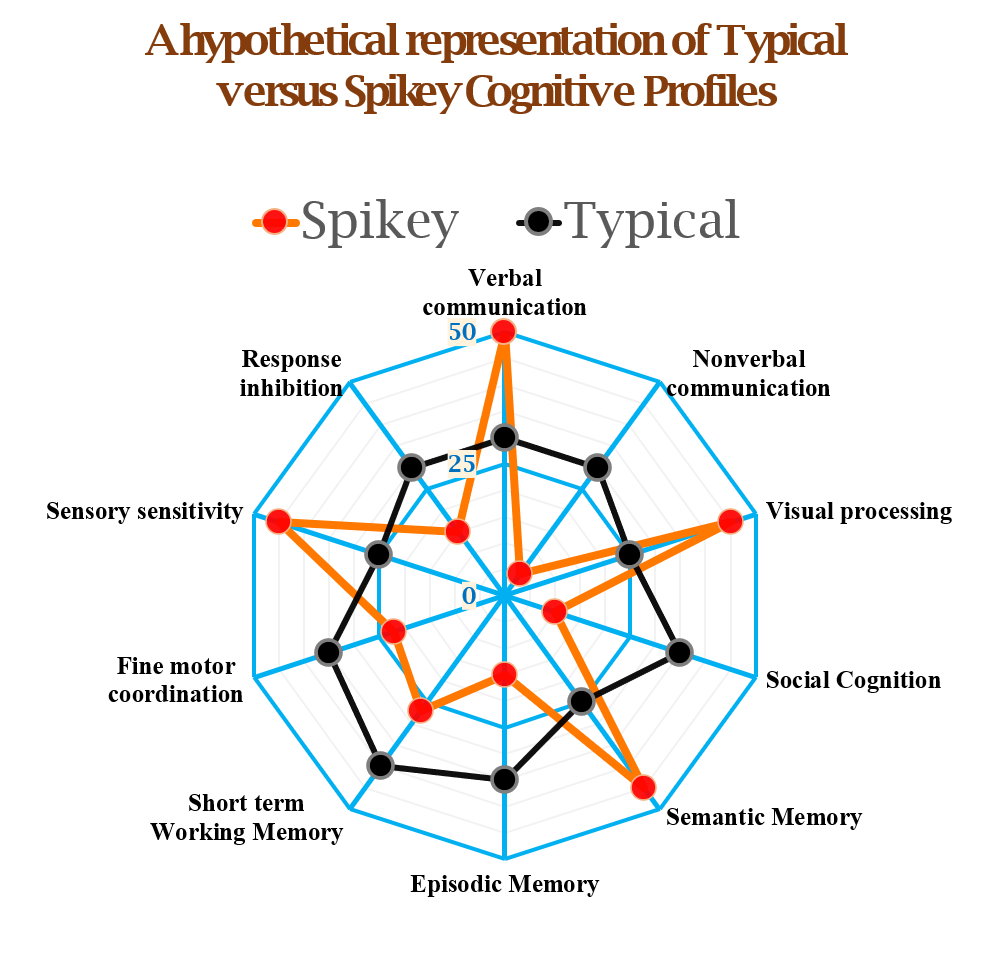
Different information filtering mechanism in autistic people may be due to difference in cognitive components. a hypothetical radar plot of spikey cognitive profile. Similar details can be found in Nancy Doyle's paper Neurodiversity at work: a biopsychosocial model and the impact on working adults.

== See also ==
- Autism and memory
- Caetextia
- Centration
- Extraversion and introversion
- Idée fixe (psychology)
- Monomania
- Obsessive–compulsive personality disorder
- Special interest (autism)
