= Autism and memory =

The relationship between autism and memory, specifically memory functions in relation to autism spectrum disorder (ASD), is an ongoing topic of research. ASD is a neurodevelopmental disorder characterised by social communication and interaction impairments, along with restricted and repetitive patterns of behavior. In this article, the word autism is used to refer to the whole range of conditions on the autism spectrum, which are not uncommon.

Some of the earliest references to the topic of autism and memory dated back to the 1960s and 1970s, when several studies appeared proposing that autism should be classified as amnesia. What is now diagnosed as autism was formerly diagnosed as developmental amnesia. Although the views of autism as an amnesia of memory have now been rejected, there are still many studies done on the relationship between memory functions and autism.

Autism can affect memory in complex and varied ways, with strengths and challenges depending on the individual. Many autistic people show strong semantic memory, excelling at recalling facts, details, or specific areas of interest, while episodic memory—recalling personal experiences, especially social or emotional ones—may be more difficult. Working memory, which involves holding and manipulating information short-term (Paytin), can also be weaker, particularly for verbal tasks. In contrast, visual and rote memory are often strengths, enabling some individuals to remember patterns, dates, or sequences with high accuracy. Although working memory difficulty is not part of the diagnostic criteria for ASD, it is widely recognized that autistic people commonly exhibit specific types of memory difficulties. These memory differences can influence daily life, learning, and social interactions, but vary widely across the autism spectrum. Further research is needed to get a fuller understanding of the relationship between autism and memory.

== Physiological underpinnings ==
The physical underpinnings of the cause for differences in the memory of autistic people has been studied. Bachevalier suggests a major difference in the brain of an autistic person resides in the neural mechanisms of the structures in the medial temporal lobe (MTL) and perhaps, more specifically the amygdaloid complex. This may have implications in their ability to encode information because of the role the MTL and especially the hippocampal areas play in information processing. DeLong reinforces this by suggesting autism affects hippocampal function. Because the hippocampus is pivotal in memory encoding and modulating memory consolidation, any impairment can drastically affect an autistic person's ability to process (i.e. multi-modal) and retain information. Sumiyoshi, Kawakubo, Suga, Sumiyoshi and Kasai have suggested that it is possible that the attenuated neural activities in parahippocampal regions (including the parahippocampal gyrus) may affect an autistic person's ability to organize information. This region has an implied role in sorting, relating, and sending information to the hippocampus. The authors believe this altered or inhibited activity within the hippocampal regions may explain some of the behavioral differences in autistic people.

Further evidence suggests autistic people have differences in the circuitry responsible for what Brothers calls the neural basis for social intelligence, which involves holistically interpreting people's expressions and intentions. The interaction between the amygdala, the orbitofrontal cortex, and the superior temporal sulcus and gyrus enables processing of social information for personal interaction. For people who are autistic, altered activation in these areas may explain difficulties in remembering social-emotional information.

== Long-term memory ==
There are two types of long-term memory; both of which have been studied in relation to autism. Declarative memory is memory that can be consciously recalled, such as facts and knowledge. Declarative memory includes semantic and episodic memory. Semantic memory involves the recollection of facts, and episodic memory involves the recollection of previous experiences in life. Studies on autistic people have shown impairments in their episodic memory but relative preservation of their semantic memory. The brain regions that play a major role in declarative learning and memory are the hippocampus and regions of the medial temporal lobe.

Autistic people often show mixed long-term memory abilities. While semantic memory, the memory for facts, tends to remain mostly intact, memory related to personal life events, or episodic memory, may be impaired. This particularly affects social or emotional information in an individual. Studies also suggest that high-functioning autistic individuals have intact recognition memory for non-social stimuli while struggling with features such as color or location.

=== Declarative memory ===
==== Autobiographical memory ====
Autobiographical memory is an example of declarative memory. One aspect of autobiographical memory is the self-reference effect, which means that typically people have a stronger memory for information that is relevant to themselves. It has been theorized that autistic people have diminished psychological self-knowledge but intact physical self-knowledge. As a result, these individuals show impaired autobiographical episodic memory and a reduced self-reference effect (which may each rely on psychological aspects of the self-concept), but do not show specific impairments in memory for their own rather than others' actions (which may rely on physical aspects of the self-concept).

A study by Unveren et al. in 2025 found that autistic people recalled shorter and less detailed autobiographical memories. The researchers compared 4 autistic and 8 non-autistic people using memory tasks and brain imaging. They found that the autistic people recalled shorter, less detailed personal memories. One limitation to this study is that they used a small number of participants.

==== Explicit memory retrieval and recognition ====
Recognition in HFA (high-functioning autistic) people has been widely studied. Overall, these studies conclude that the majority of HFA people have intact recognition abilities. Non-social stimulus recognition is often superior, or "robustly intact", although there is some evidence suggesting that HFA people have difficulty with complex scenes and color combinations. For example, HFA people exhibit intact recognition of non-social stimuli such as written words, spoken sentences, pictures of common objects, and meaningless patterns or shapes. HFA people showed intact memory for individual features (such as objects, colors, or locations), but impaired memory binding when asked to recognize object-color or object-location combinations. Impaired memory has also been found in the recognition of words encoded self-referentially—that is, words processed in relation to oneself, such as judging whether a word describes one's own personality.

Contrary to the plethora of HFA recognition memory studies, the study of recognition for M-LFA (medium-low functioning autistic) people is considerably lacking. The studies that do exist predominantly point to impaired recognition of pictures, words to name objects, and other non-social stimuli. Four delayed recognition studies reported recognition impairments for M-LFA participants. Additionally, four of the seven primary studies of non-social stimuli recognition revealed significant impairment of non-social stimuli for M-LFA people. The other three studies were less reliable because of their methodology. Boucher, Lewis, and Collis gathered data supporting poor facial recognition, something widely observed for M-LFA people.

=== Implicit/non-declarative memory ===
Implicit memory, also known as non-declarative memory, appears to be relatively strong in many autistic people. Procedural memory, priming, and classical conditioning often function normally in higher-performing individuals, especially with therapies, allowing them to learn habits and patterns without conscious awareness.

Implicit memory is memory that relies on past experiences to help recall things without actively thinking of them. Procedural memory, classical conditioning, and priming are all included in implicit memory; for example, procedural skills, such as riding a bike, become so natural over time that one does not have to explicitly think about them. The brain regions that process implicit memory are the basal ganglia and the cerebellum. Research suggests that HFA and M-LFA people show strong implicit memory functions. HFA people display intact implicit memory for non-social stimuli, unimpaired classical conditioning, and performance on other implicit learning tasks. HFA people displayed normal perceptual and conceptual priming. Studies concerning implicit memory in M-LFA people are sparse, and further study is needed.

As mentioned above, there are very few reliable studies of non-declarative memory for M-LFA people. However, there are some speculations. Some consider that the impaired motor skills evident in many cases of M-LFA may suggest impaired procedural learning. Other studies, including Walenski (2006) and Romero-Muguia (2008), also think that ASD behavior is indicative of implicit memory function. For example, many autistic people have exceptional implicit perceptual processing abilities in mathematics, the arts and in musical improvisation. Furthermore, there is speculation that because M-LFA people are often characterised by habit and routine, habit formation is likely unimpaired. Behavioral treatments and therapies used with M-LFA people are usually very helpful, suggesting that implicit knowledge can be acquired and conditioning is intact.

== Working memory ==
Working memory, a cognitive system with limited capacity that retains and manipulates multiple pieces of transient information, has been found to be affected in autistic people. Certain studies have suggested that deficits in working memory performance exist in autistic people, especially when it comes to verbally mediated working memory tasks. One reason for this impairment is due to the working memory which is a part of the executive functions (EF), an umbrella term for cognitive processes that regulate, control, and manage other cognitive processes, for instance planning and attention.

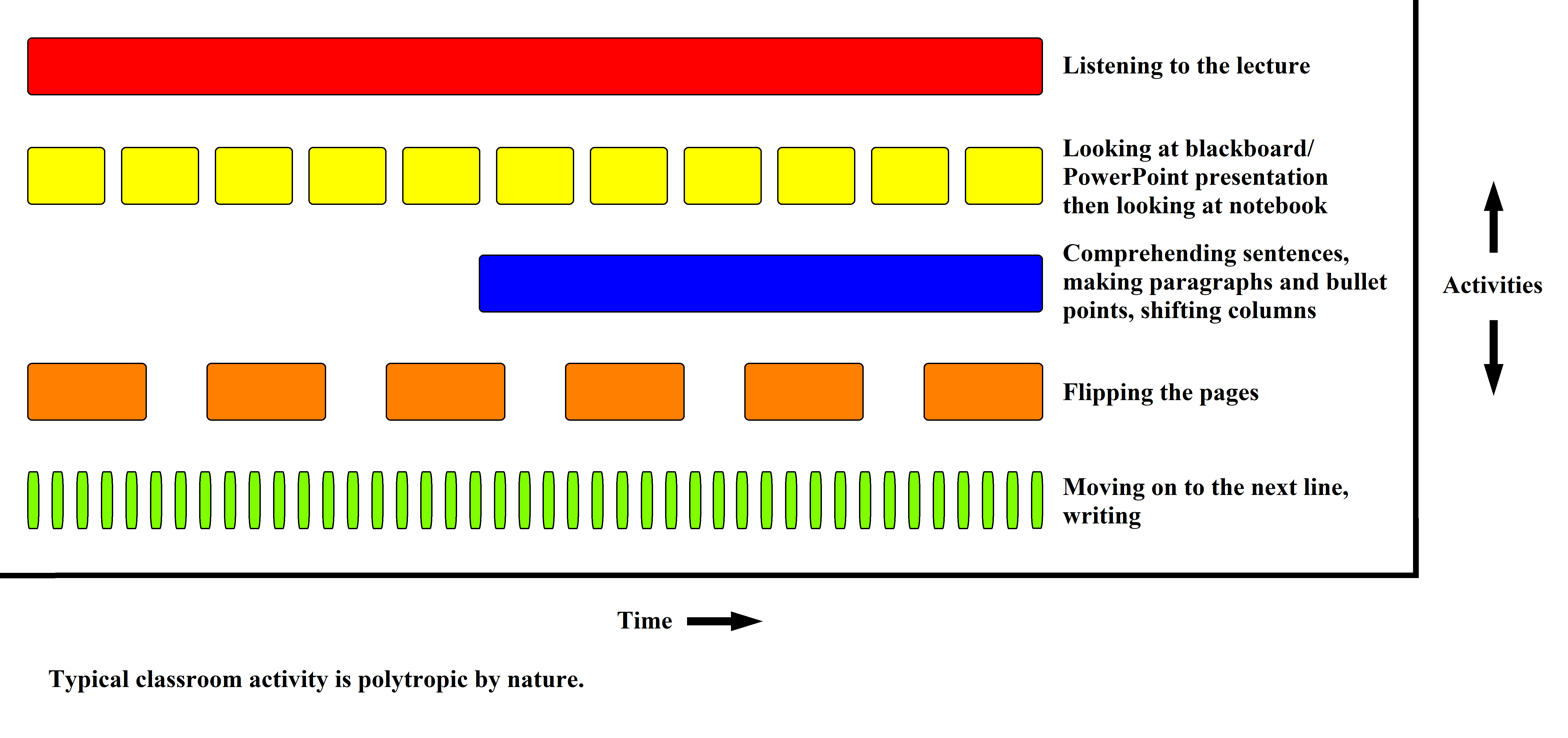
Typical classroom activity requires much polytropic processing of stimuli.

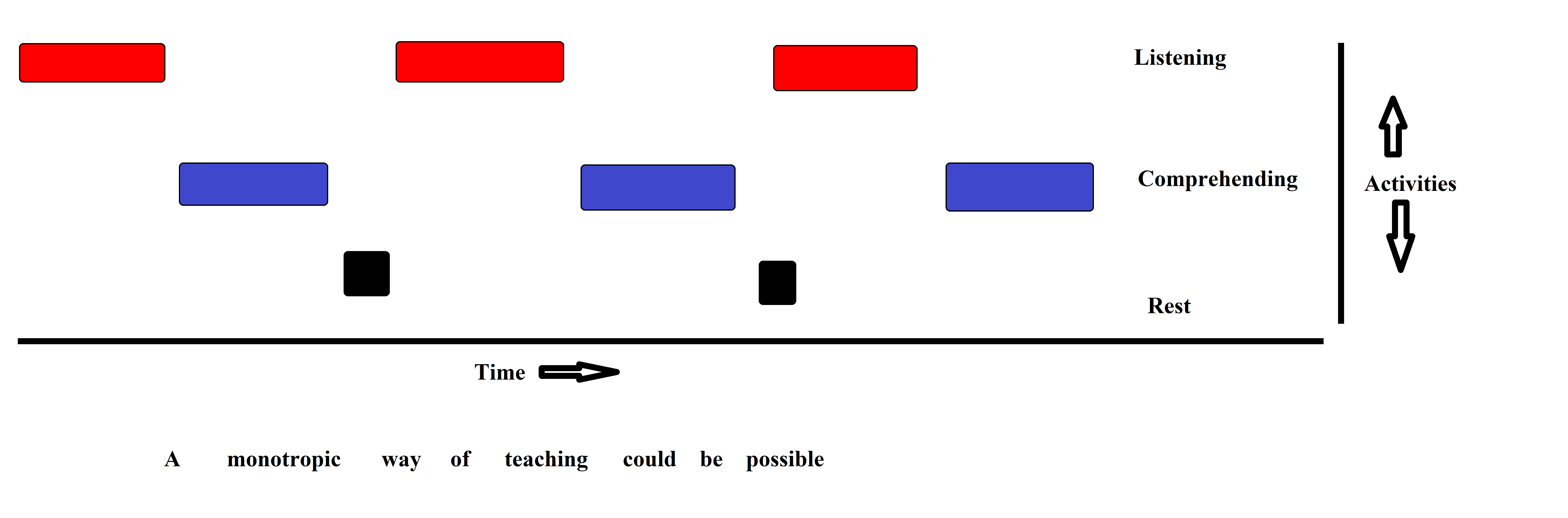
A monotropic way of teaching can be greatly helpful for students with autism.

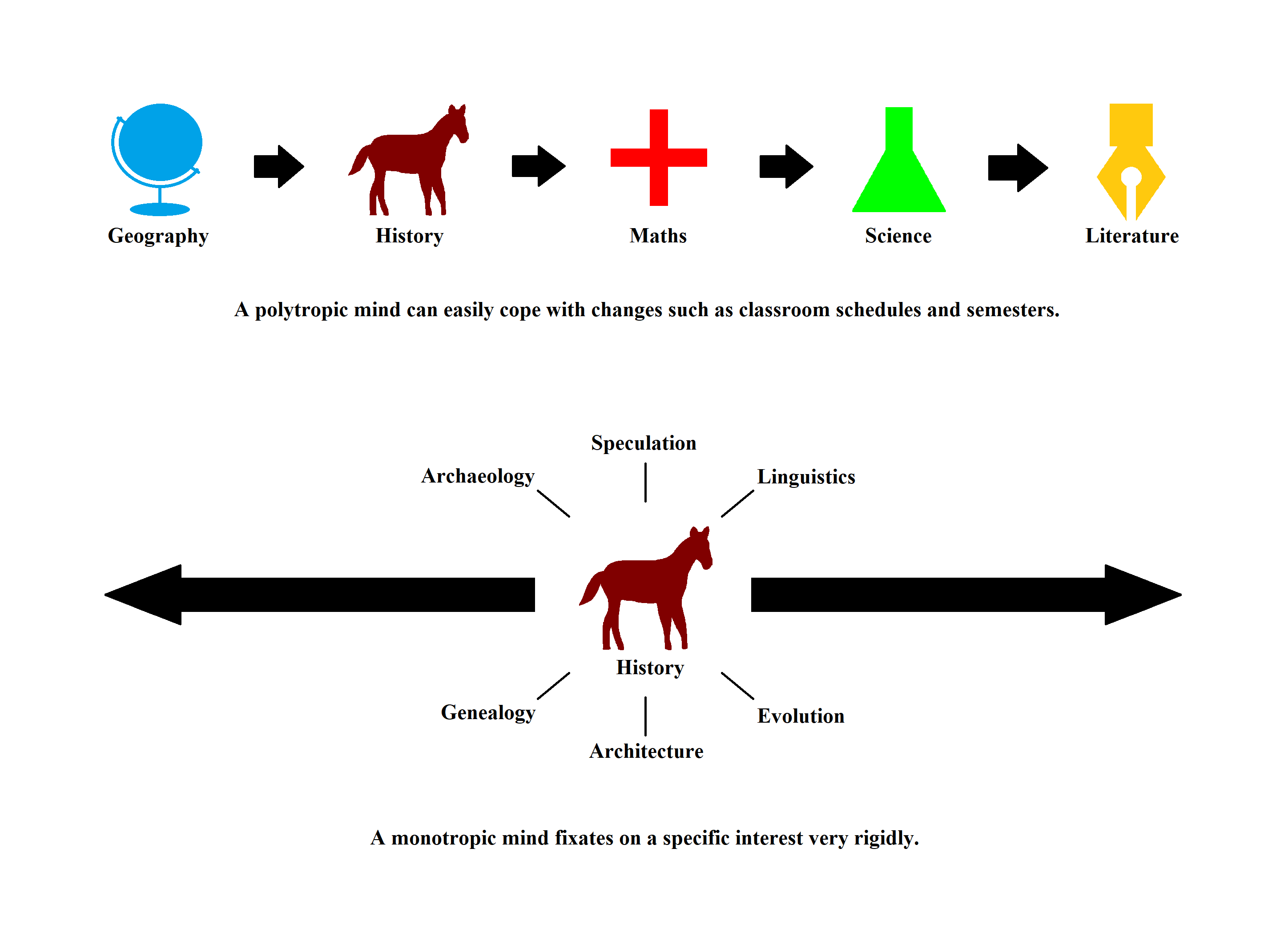
Monotropic and polytropic learning

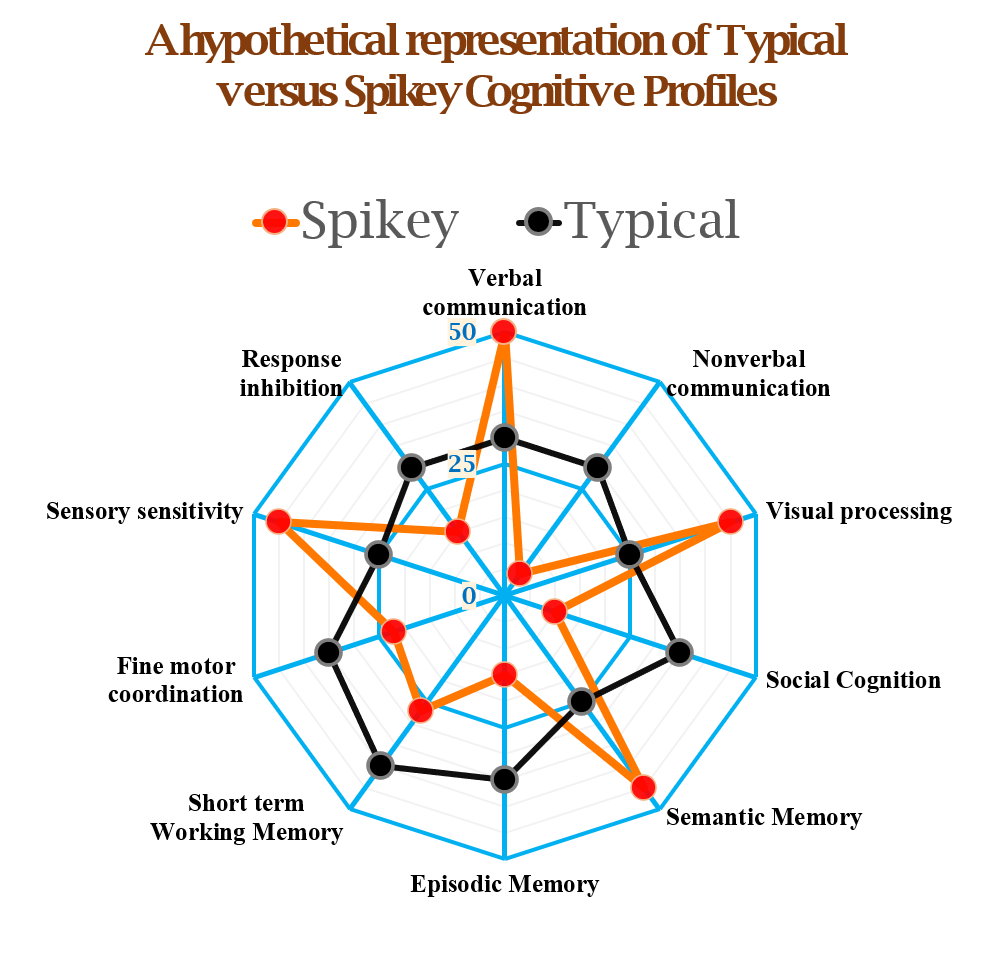
a hypothetical radar plot of spikey cognitive profile. Similar details can be found in Doyle, Nancy. "Neurodiversity at work: a biopsychosocial model and the impact on working adults." British medical bulletin 135, no. 1 (2020): 108-125.

A majority of the research has found that autistic people perform poorly on measures of executive function. A general decrease in working memory (WM) is one of the limitations, although some studies have shown that working memory is not impaired in autistic children relative to controls matched for IQ. However, some evidence suggests that there may be minimal impairment in high-functioning autistic (HFA) people in that they have intact associative learning ability, verbal working memory, and recognition memory. A longitudinal study by Kim and Kasari (2025) found that autistic children continued to improve their working memory over a longer period of time than typically developing peers. This suggests that working memory development in autistic children may extend later into childhood.. In rare cases, there are even instances of individuals possessing extremely good memory in constricted domains which are typically characterized as savants. Bennetto, Pennington and Rogers also suggest that WM deficits and limited EF is likely compounded by the onset of autism where early development yields hindrances in social interaction which typically (i.e. without impairment) improves both WM and EF. However, due to limited ability in interpreting social gestures and an impaired ability to process such information in a holistic and comprehensive manner, autistic people are subject to diminishing and confounding instances of memory functions and performance.

Working memory in autistic people shows mixed outcomes depending on the task type. Verbal working memory may be affected, particularly when tasks involve complex sequences and social interactions. Visual working memory, on the other hand, can be very strong in detail-oriented tasks, depending on the individual. Research suggests that autistic people rely less on semantic associations and instead focus on precise details, consistent with the weak central coherence theory.

=== Global working memory ===
Beversdorf finds that autistic people are not as reliant on contextual information (i.e. comparing typically related schemas) to aid in memory consolidation; they are less likely to rely on semantically similar cues (ex. doctor–nurse vs. doctor–beach). Thus, an autistic person would fare well on discriminating and recalling accurate items from false items.

Bennetto, Pennington and Rogers investigated the degree of cognitive impairment in autistic people with an emphasis on illuminating the latency in executive functioning. Findings suggested a hindrance in temporal order, source, free recall and working memory. However, their participants did exhibit capable short and long-term memory, cued recall and the capacity to learn new material. In sum, they suggested that there is both a general deficit in global working memory and a specific impairment in social intelligence where the former is exacerbated by the latter and vice versa.

Other evidence points towards unique mnemonic strategies used by autistic people wherein they rely less on semantic associative networks and are less constricted by conventional word-word associations (ex. orange–apple). This may be due to abnormalities in medial temporal lobe regions. Thus, autistic people may have the capacity for more abstract but robust associations. Firth addresses this with the term weak central coherence, meaning a reduced tendency for processing information in context and integration of higher-level meaning. This may explain why autistic people have a heightened capacity for noticing seemingly disjointed details. For example, in the embedded figures test (EFT), autistic people exhibited a faster and heightened ability to locate the target because of their diminished reliance on global perception. In a study conducted on autistic children, it was shown that neurocognition influences word learning. The process of syntactic development requires a child to match co-occurrences of words or parts of words (morphemes) and their meanings. This process can depend on working memory. The limited short-term verbal memory paired with working memory may be the reason of language delay in autistic children. According to the result of this experiment the autistic group was able to perform the part of the test with nonlinguistic cues which depended on working memory but failed to pass short-term memory and the linguistic part of it. This explains the delay of language in autistic children and neurocognition is an important contributor to it.

=== Central executive or executive functioning ===
It is believed that a dysfunction in working memory significantly influences the symptoms associated with autism spectrum disorders. In examining autism through the lens of Baddeley & Hitch's model of working memory, there have been conflicting results in the research. Some studies have shown that autistic people have impaired executive functioning, which means working memory does not function correctly. However, other studies have failed to find an effect in autistic people with a high level of functioning. Tests such as the Wisconsin Card Sorting Test have been administered to autistic people, and the lower scores have been interpreted as indicative of a poor ability to focus on relevant information and thus a deficit within the central executive aspect of working memory. An aspect of autism is that it might be present, to a certain extent, in first-degree relatives. One study found that siblings of autistic people have limited ability to focus and conceptualize categories using updated information. Given these results, it is reasonable to suggest that these so-called deficits in cognitive ability are of the cognitive endophenotypes (i.e., relatives) of autism.

==== Category integration ====
Given these findings, it would appear that autistic people have trouble categorizing. Studies have shown that category induction is in fact possible and can occur at the same cognitive level as non-autistic people. Given that aspects of category formation such as discrimination and feature detection are enhanced among autistic people, it is viable to state that although they require more trials and/or time to learn material and may employ different learning strategies than non-autistic people, once learned, the level of categorization displayed is on par with that of a non-autistic people.

The idea that autistic people learn differently than those without autism can account for the delay in their ability to categorize. However, once they begin categorizing they are at an average level of cognitive ability as compared to those who are not autistic. This, however, is only applicable to higher functioning people within the spectrum as those with lower IQ levels are notoriously difficult to test and measure.

During the 1980s, developmental psychologist Uta Frith proposed that autistic people have a weak central coherence. This theory meshes well with the general traits of autism. As opposed to viewing a forest as a collection of trees, those who are autistic see one tree, and another tree, and another tree and thus it takes an immense amount of time to process complex tasks in comparison with non-autistic people. Weak central coherence can be used to explain what is viewed as a working memory deficit in attention or inhibition, as autistic people possess an intense focus on single parts of a complex, multi-part concept and cannot inhibit this in order to withdraw focus and direct it on the whole rather than a singular aspect. Thus, this suggests that the decrement in working memory is partially inherited which is then exacerbated by further genetic complications leading to a diagnosis of autism.

=== Visual and spatial memory ===
Deficits in spatial working memory appear to be familial in autistic people, and probably even in their close relatives. Replication of movements by others, a task that requires spatial awareness and memory capacities, can also be difficult for autistic children and adults.

People with Asperger syndrome were found to have spatial working memory deficits compared with control subjects on the executive-golf task, although these may be indicative of a more general deficit in non-verbal intelligence in autistic people. Despite these results, autistic children have been found to be superior to non-autistic children in certain tasks, such as map learning and cued path recall regarding a navigated real-life labyrinth. Steele et al. attempts to explain this discrepancy by advancing the theory that the performance of autistic people on spatial memory tasks degrades faster in the face of increasing task difficulty, when compared with non-autistic people. These results suggest that working memory is related with an individual's ability to solve problems, and that autism is a hindrance in this area.

Autistic people appear to have a local bias for visual information processing, that is, a preference for processing local features (details, parts) rather than global features (the whole). One explanation for this local bias is that autistic people do not have the normal global precedence when looking at objects and scenes. Alternatively, autism could bring about limitations in the complexity of information that can be manipulated in short-term visual memory during graphic planning.

The difficulties that autistic people often have in regard to facial recognition has prompted further questions. Some researchers have shown that the fusiform gyrus in autistic people acts differently from in non-autistic people, which may explain the aforementioned troubles regarding facial recognition. A study was conducted to determine the differences in visual memory functioning by using face stimuli to help understand social memory processing for autistic children in comparison to non-autistic children. The study focused on the working visual memory by a comparison study of children 7 to 12 years of age. The participants completed tasks on a computer screen where they needed to memorize the orientations of faces shown on the screen. The study showed that there was significant findings that autistic children made more errors due to precision limitations. This leads to other questions like if there is possible damage to areas of the brain that affects a persons working memory. Future studies should look closely at the brain structures.

Research by Baltruschat et al. has shown that improvement in spatial working memory for autistic people may be possible. Adapting a behaviorist approach by using positive reinforcement could increase WM efficiency in young autistic children. To further Baltruschat et al. research a study was conducted with 3 participants. All 3 participants were autistic, were above the age of 6, and the ability to follow instructions. The study examined positive behavioral reinforcement and found that when there was intervention and positive reinforcements the participants reaction times and accuracy increased rapidly. This study suggests that positive reinforcements for autistic children can greatly help their working memory and executive functioning.

=== Auditory and phonological memory ===
The research on phonological working memory in autism is extensive and at times conflicting. Some research has found that, in comparison with spatial memory, verbal memory and inner speech use remain relatively spared, while other studies have found limitations on the use of inner speech by autistic people. Others have found a benefit to phonological processing in autism when compared with semantic processing, and attribute the results to a similar developmental abnormality to that in savant syndrome.

In particular, Whitehouse et al. have found that autistic children, when compared with non-autistic children of a similar mean verbal age and reading ability, performed better when asked to recall a set of pictures presented to them, but not as well when asked to recall a set of printed words presented interspersed with the pictures; a competing verbal task given to both sets of participants also worsened performance on control children more than it did on autistic children. They also reported that word length effects were greater for the control group. These results are contested by Williams, Happé, and Jarrold, who contend that it may be verbal IQ, rather than verbal ability, that is at issue, and Whitehouse et al.'s subjects were not matched on chronological age. Williams, Happé, and Jarrold themselves found no difference between autistic children and controls on a serial recall task where phonological similarity effects, rather than word length effects, were used as an alternate measure of inner speech use.

Joseph et al. found that a self-ordered pointing task in autistic children involving stimuli that could be remembered as words (e.g. shovel, cat) was impaired relative to non-autistic children, but the same task with abstract stimuli was not impaired in autistic children. In contrast, Williams et al. found that autistic children scored significantly lower than non-autistic children on spatial memory tests. Williams et al. not only experimented with spatial memory tasks, but verbal memory as well. They discovered that in an experimental group and a control group of non-autistic people, that while differences were found in spatial memory ability, no significant difference was seen between the groups regarding verbal memory. They ran their experiments with both children and adult participants. Autism is a neurodevelopmental disorder, so it is possible that life experiences could alter the memory performance in autistic adults. Williams et al. experimented with children separately to see if they had different results from their adult counterparts. They used a WRAML (Wide Range Assessment of Memory and Learning) test, a test specifically designed to test memory in children. Test results were similar across all age groups, that significant differences between non-autistic and autistic participants are found only in spatial memory, not verbal working memory.

Gabig et al. discovered that autistic children, regarding verbal working memory and story retelling, performed worse than a control group of non-autistic children. In three separate tasks designed to test verbal working memory, the autistic children scored well below the expected levels for their age. While results do show lower scores for autistic children, there was also information that suggested lack of vocabulary contributed to the lower scores, rather than working memory itself.

A study was conducted using a contrast effect test to show the sequence effects on categorization this test was developed by Stewart and his colleges. The purpose of the study was to examine if autistic children process sequence effects on auditory memory differently than non-autistic children. A series of 10 tones was presented to a sample size of 32 male only individuals. The participants were split into two groups. The test group contained 15 autistic adolescent males and the control group contained 17 non-autistic adolescent males. The participants in both groups were first presented with a controlled order of auditory stimuli. Then later were presented with another set of tones of which the examiner would manipulate some of the sounds. There was a total of 20 trials conducted with 42 possible controlled sequences The results showed that the participants in the autistic test group did not show perceived auditory sequence effects whereas the non-autistic control group did show the hearing of the sounds previously did affect how they perceived later sounds. These results suggest that autistic adolescents perceive each auditory stimuli individually rather than as a group or collection. This study can help further study's of categorization along with long term memory aspects.

There is some evidence from an fMRI study that autistic people are more likely to use visual cues rather than verbal cues on some working memory tasks, based on the differentially high activation of right parietal regions over left parietal regions in an N-back working memory task with letters.

=== Opposing results ===
Some data has shown that autistic people may not have WM (working memory) impairments and that the supposed impairment observed is a result of testing. Nakahachi et al. argue that the vagueness of many tests measuring WM levels in autistic people is the cause. They found that autistic people only performed worse on WM tests if the test itself could have interfered with the completion of the test. These findings show that the type of test and the way it is presented to autistic people can strongly affect the results; therefore, much caution should be taken in choosing the design of a study focusing on WM in autistic people.

Ozonoff et al. have found similar results in their studies on working memory in autistic people. Their research showed no significant difference between autistic and non-autistic people in tests designed to measure various aspects of working memory. This supports the notion that autism does not inhibit WM. Results from experiments that have shown lower WM facilities in autistic people may be due to the human interaction nature of these experiments as autistic people exhibit low social functioning skills. Experiments utilizing computer rather than human interaction remove this problem and may head more accurate findings.

Further research by Griffith et al. also indicates that WM may not be impaired in autistic people. There may be some executive function impairments in these individuals, but not in working memory and rather in social and language skills, which can affect education early in life. Other research conducted by Griffith et al. on young autistic people did not measure verbal working abilities, but nonetheless found no significant difference between the executive functions in autistic and non-autistic people. Though there has been much research that alludes to low WM abilities in autistic people, these recent data weaken the argument that autistic people have little WM facilities.

== Memory strengths ==
Some autistic people have been diagnosed with savant syndrome. Those who are considered savants exhibit extraordinary memory abilities in specific domains such as music, art, mathematics, or calendar memory. This demonstrates that memory in autism is not uniformly affected; individuals can exhibit peaks and dips depending on the type of memory and their cognitive profile.

Autism may cause some difficulties but there are also some skills that remain intact. A study on prototype recognition was conducted with 15 non-autistic and 15 autistic children. To examine the children were supposed to put items in categories based on their similarities by using recognition tests and prototype tests. The study suggested that autistic children recognition skills remain at the same level with normal development.

== Further research ==
Few studies of implicit/non-declarative memory exist. Almost all of the M-LFA studies were conducted with young people aged 3–18. A specific call has been issued for the investigation of total loss of declarative memory in significantly low-functioning, nonverbal autistic people.

There is need for more studies on autism and possible treatments. A study was conducted in relation to Cognitive Enhancement Therapy. The study suggested that CET was a plausible effective therapy for both social and nonsocial impairments due to autism. The study also suggests that more long-term therapies should be conducted. Along with that, many studies on autism are focused on children. The older population report more memory difficulties among the entire population. Also, older autistic people continue to have difficulties with normal tasks as they age without the proper treatment. There needs to be more longevity studies in regards how memory is affected as autistic people age.

== See also ==
- Monotropism – Cognitive strategy in autism
- Conditions comorbid to autism – Medical conditions more common in autistic people
