= Caetextia =

Context blindness as a symptom of autism

Caetextia (from the Latin word caecus, meaning "blind" and contextus, meaning "context") is a term and concept first coined by psychologists Joe Griffin and Ivan Tyrrell to describe a chronic disorder that manifests as a context blindness in people on the autism spectrum. It was specifically used to designate the most dominant manifestation of autistic behaviour in higher-functioning individuals. Griffin and Tyrell also suggested that caetextia "is a more accurate and descriptive term for this inability to see how one variable influences another, particularly at the higher end of the spectrum, than the label of 'Asperger's syndrome'".

Caetextia presents itself as the inability to adjust behaviour appropriately to deal with interacting variables. People with caetextia may fail to consider the context surrounding the behaviour. This can result in people with caetextia experiencing elevated levels of frustration, anger, and anxiety when faced with a situation that requires giving attention to more than one interacting variable or factor at a time. This can be attributed to the inability to unconsciously draw upon the contextual information presented in a given situation as well as evaluate the significance of change with regards to the surrounding environment.

Caetextia can also exist in a temporary form prompted by stress, anxiety, or depression.

== In autism spectrum disorder ==
Many of the symptoms observed in patients with Asperger's can be attributed to caetextia. In order for someone to be considered contextually aware, they must be able to attach attention to and detach it from the interacting variables in a given situation. This implies active integration of sensory information gathered from the situation. It has been found that patients differ in their ability to perform these functions based on the dominant hemisphere of their brain.

Some areas that are affected by ASD are the ability to understand and use non-verbal and verbal communication, behave in socially appropriate ways, flexible thinking, and under or over sensitivity to sensory stimuli.

Context blindness has been speculated as having a relationship with other prominent neurocognitive theories of autism spectrum disorder (ASD) such as theory of mind, empathizing–systemizing, social coherence and executive function.

== Related concept: context blindness (Vermeulen) ==
Independently of Griffin and Tyrrell, the Flemish clinical educationalist Peter Vermeulen developed a closely related concept under the name context blindness (Dutch: contextblindheid), which he used in Dutch-language work from 2007 onwards, in the book Autism as Context Blindness (2012), and in a peer-reviewed synthesis in Focus on Autism and Other Developmental Disabilities in 2015.

Where Griffin and Tyrrell frame caetextia primarily in terms of the ability to maintain and switch between separate streams of attention, Vermeulen situates context blindness in the tradition of weak central coherence theory of Uta Frith and Francesca Happé, and defines it as a reduced spontaneous use of context in deriving meaning from stimuli, language, behaviour and situations. In later work, Vermeulen has linked context blindness to predictive processing accounts of the brain, drawing on the free energy principle of Karl Friston.

The empirical status of Vermeulen's context-blindness hypothesis is mixed. A study by Souza and colleagues found that individuals with high-functioning autism spectrum disorder did make use of contextual information in visual short-term memory tasks, which the authors interpreted as evidence against a strict version of the hypothesis.

== Evolutionary importance ==
Occurring through the whole autism spectrum is the inability to read context. Through evolutionary psychology, the importance of context when making decisions and performing behaviours can be seen in mammals. Mammals had to develop the ability to store memories of previous information and use this information to influence future encounters more efficiently. This enabled them to perform a risk analysis of different events. They had to make decisions based on the specific circumstances or context that they found themselves in as their survival may depend on it.

To see context, we need to be able to see events from different viewpoints. It was previously believed that mammals simply responded mechanically to stimuli, however, research has concluded that there is a cognitive component involved in their response which involves prior experience. Mammals formed a mechanism capable of gauging risk by processing multiple streams of information whilst at the same time, unconsciously comparing similar, previous experiences. This is called 'parallel processing'.

The ability to effortlessly switch between separate streams of information can only be achieved when the brain can dissociate. This enables the individual to review what they know about something from previous experience whilst also paying attention to the present.

== Alternative theories ==
The theory of social coherence suggests that, when carrying out tasks, autistic people fail to process information for context-dependent meaning. This is prevalent in storytelling tasks. If an autistic person is asked to retell a story, they are likely to focus on the small details but will miss the overarching idea, meaning or metaphor. They fail to recognise the main themes as they are not recognising context. If someone who is not on the autism spectrum is asked to recall a story, they can give an overview or the central meaning of the story.

Another theory to explain ASD is the lack of ‘theory of mind’ introduced by Baron-Cohen. Some researchers propose that in ASD, there is a reduced ability to read other people's minds and use this to predict other people's behaviour. Baron-Cohen suggests that thinking about what others are thinking is essential for engaging in social activity as it underpins our ability to learn from each other and cooperate. Research suggests that theory of mind is either absent or delayed in autistic individuals and this can explain their difficulty with social interactions.

However, some 21st-century studies have shown that the results of some studies of theory of mind tests on autistic people may be misinterpreted based on the double empathy problem, which proposes that rather than autistic people specifically having trouble with theory of mind, autistic people and non-autistic people have equal difficulty understanding one-another due to their neurological differences. Studies have shown that autistic adults perform better in theory of mind tests when paired with other autistic adults as well as possibly autistic close family members. Academics who acknowledge the double empathy problem also propose that it is likely autistic people understand non-autistic people to a higher degree than vice-versa, due to the necessity of functioning in a non-autistic society.

== See also ==
- Perspective-taking
- Monotropism
- Integrative complexity
