= Dinah Murray =

Educator and campaigner (1946–2021)

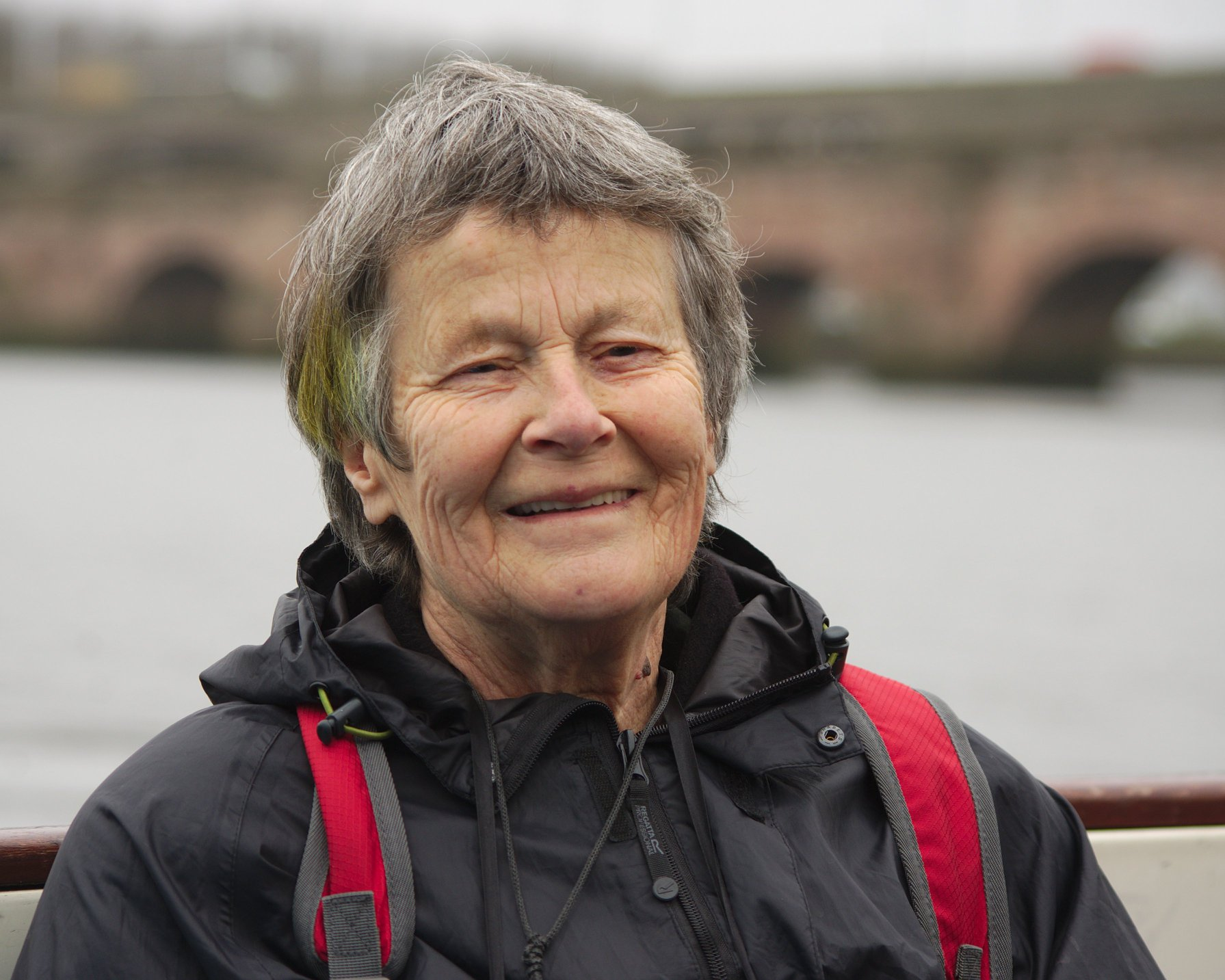
- Dinah at 71
- Born: 27 May 1946; Hampstead, London, England
- Died: 7 July 2021 (aged 75)
- Education: North London Collegiate School
- Alma mater: University College London
- Occupations: Autism advocate and campaigner
- Awards: Lifetime Achievement Award by the National Autistic Society

Dinah Karen Crawshay Murray (27 May 1946 – 7 July 2021) was a writer, educator and campaigner for autistic people. She collaborated in developing the theory of monotropism as a way of explaining autism in terms of a tendency to focus intensely on a subject.

== Early life ==
Murray was born in Hampstead, London, the daughter of Labour Party politician, Tony Greenwood, who was a member of Harold Wilson's cabinet. Her mother Jill Greenwood, was a writer who created and illustrated the pamphlet Make Do and Mend, published during World War II, and was co-founder of the Campaign for Nuclear Disarmament. Murray's godfather was the Labour Prime Minister of the time, Clement Attlee. Murray attended Byron House school in Highgate and the North London Collegiate School. She worked for Penguin Books as a copy editor before attending University College London, where she earned a degree in Linguistics and Anthropology in 1969.

== Career ==
Murray was autistic, and spent most of her career researching, campaigning and working with autistic individuals. She went on to gain a PhD in linguistics from University College London in 1986. She was a tutor at Birmingham University's distance learning course on autism, WebAutism, from 1996 to 2013.

In the 1990s she was a community support worker in London, an experience which led her to found APANA (Autistic People Against Neuroleptic Abuse), highlighting the overuse of tranquillisers given to intellectually disabled people.

During those years, Murray collaborated with autistic associates Wenn Lawson and Mike Lesser, to develop the theory of "monotropism", an attempt to explain autism in terms of a tendency to focus on a single subject at a time. Seeing advantages of computers as communication tools for autistic people, she and Lesser founded the campaigning organisation, Autism and Computing. Their work contributed to the passage of the Mental Capacity Act 2005.

Her work included teaching and research, presenting at conferences, online and in person. In 2017, Murray was given a Lifetime Achievement Award by the National Autistic Society. She contributed to an online communications technology application, AutNav, which achieved funding from Scottish Autism just before she died.

== Personal life ==
In 1970, she married David Murray, a philosopher and music critic, who died in 2016. They had three children of their own, as well as a foster child. After the 2019 United Kingdom general election returned a Conservative majority, she moved to Dalgety Bay in Fife, Scotland.
