= Weak central coherence theory =

Theory on autism

The weak central coherence theory (WCC), also called the central coherence theory (CC), suggests that a specific perceptual-cognitive style, loosely described as a limited ability to understand context or to "see the big picture", underlies the central issue in autism and related autism spectrum disorder. Autism is a neurodevelopmental disorder characterized by impaired social interaction and communication, repetitive behaviours, restricted interests, and sensory processing issues.

Uta Frith of University College London first advanced the weak central coherence theory in the late 1980s. Frith surmised that autistic people typically think about things in the smallest possible parts. Her hypothesis is that autistic children actually perceive details better than non-autistic people, but "cannot see the wood for the trees." The weak central coherence theory attempts to explain how some autistic people can show remarkable ability in subjects like mathematics and engineering, yet have trouble with language skills and tend to live in an isolated social world. Recent researchers have found the results difficult to reproduce in experimental conditions and autistic researchers have criticised the overall base assumptions as contradictory and biased.

== Support and criticism ==
Since the 1990s, this theory has been a topic in many studies in which the central coherence skills of autistic individuals are compared to those of control samples.

1. Results in which these skills are measured with visuospatial tasks confirm the theory to a large extent. Autistic individuals performed tasks where a design or a figure had to be divided into their constituent parts faster than control individuals. For example, autistic individuals perceived the constituent blocks in an unsegmented condition of a Block Design Task more easily. In addition, they performed Embedded Figures Tasks in which hidden shapes in drawings have to be found as quickly as possible, better than control individuals.
2. Results in which central coherence skills are measured with perceptual or verbal-semantic tasks revealed that autistic individuals have a tendency for fragmented perception, and that they benefit less from the context of meaning in sentences, narratives and memory tests

However, there is currently no consensus about the validity of the weak central coherence theory. There are researchers who find results that refute the WCC theory.

In 1994, Sally Ozonoff, David L. Strayer, William M. McMahon and Francis Filloux compared information processing skills in high-functioning autistics and controls:

"The performance of high-functioning autistic children was compared with that of two matched control groups, one with Tourette Syndrome and the other developmentally normal. Autistic subjects performed as well as controls on tasks requiring global-local processing and inhibition of neutral responses."

Laurent Mottron, Jacob A. Burack, Johannes E. A. Stauder and Philippe Robaey (1999) conclude that:

"Contrary to expectations based on the central coherence and hierarchisation deficit theories, [our] findings indicate intact holistic processing among persons with autism."

In 2003, Mottron and Burack did another study which confirmed their earlier findings and in which they conclude:

"Conclusions: [Our] findings are consistent with other reports of superior performance in detecting embedded figures (Jolliffe & Baron-Cohen, 1997; Shah & Frith, 1983), but typical performance in global and configural processing (Mottron, Burack et al., 1999; Ozonoff et al., 1994) among persons with high-functioning autism. Thus, the notions of local bias and global impairment that are part of WCC may need to be reexamined."

Also in 2003, Beatriz López, Susan R. Leekam conclude their study:

"Conclusions: [Our] findings demonstrate that children with autism do not have a general difficulty in connecting context information and item information as predicted by weak central coherence theory. Instead the results suggest that there is specific difficulty with complex verbal stimuli and in particular with using sentence context to disambiguate meaning."

Natasja van Lang gives the following explanation for these contradictory results:

"Results in which central coherence skills are measured with perceptual or verbal-semantic tasks revealed that autistic individuals have a tendency for fragmented perception (Jarrold & Russell, 1997; Happé, 1996), and that they benefit less from the context of meaning in sentences, narratives and memory tests (Happé, 1994b; Jolliffe & Baron-Cohen, 1999). However, some studies failed to replicate these findings (Brian & Bryson, 1996; Ozonoff et al., 1991; Ropar & Mitchell, 1999). This inconsistency may be explained on the basis of how weak central coherence was measured in terms of an inability to process globally versus the preference for processing locally. Recent studies suggest that people with autism are able to process globally when they are instructed to do so, however they process information locally when no such instructions are offered (Mottron et al., 1999; Plaisted et al., 1999; Rinehart et al., 2000)."

== Related concept: context blindness ==
The term context blindness has been used by the Flemish clinical educationalist Peter Vermeulen to describe a closely related but distinct construct within autism research. Vermeulen argues that the weak central coherence account focuses primarily on perceptual integration — a detail-oriented processing style with reduced spontaneous global integration — while the phenomenon of context blindness concerns the meaning-making stage: the extent to which context, prior experience and implicit cues are spontaneously incorporated into the interpretation of stimuli, utterances and situations. He therefore presents context blindness not as a replacement of the weak central coherence theory, but as an accent on an aspect of the same broader cognitive style.

More recently, this account has been connected to predictive processing models of the brain, drawing on the free energy principle of Karl Friston, in which perception is understood as an inferential process in which sensory input is continuously supplemented by prior experience, expectation and context. The concept of context blindness has also been used, under the Latin term caetextia, by Joe Griffin and Ivan Tyrrell in work independent of Vermeulen's. Empirical studies have produced mixed results, with some authors arguing that a strict version of the context-blindness hypothesis is not supported by task-based evidence.

== See also ==
- Asperger syndrome
- Sensory processing disorder
- Theory of mind
