= Mike Lesser =

British philosopher

- Born: Michael John Lesser; 28 September 1943; Hampstead, London, England
- Died: 1 July 2015 (aged 71); Barnet, London, England

Michael John Lesser (28 September 1943 – 1 July 2015) was a mathematical philosopher and political activist.

== Early life ==
The youngest member of the Committee of 100, he was sent, aged 16, to Wormwood Scrubs Prison along with most of the committee. He served two spells as contributor to London's underground journal International Times.

He was active in May 1968 in France.

== Career ==
In 1992 he was the co-author, with Prof A. Wuensche, of the book The Global Dynamics Of Cellular Automata, published in the Santa Fe Institute's Reference Volumes. The book is an atlas of emergent forms evolving from the apparently chaotic product of a set of iterated logical operations.

He was assistant to the Directing Professor, P. Allen, at the Institute for Ecotechnological Research at Cranfield University. He is the co-author of several scientific papers on dynamical systems theory with Allen.

He worked on super computers at NASA's Goddard Jet Propulsion Lab and at the Rutherford Appleton Laboratories in Oxon, UK.

He published papers on autism with Dinah Murray, with whom he co-founded Autism and Computing, a non-profit organization.

In 2009 he founded The International Times Archive, a free archive of every page of International Times from its first issue in 1966 to its last in 1994.

A biographical interview may also be found in the style magazine Dazed & Confused. A more complete autobiography may be found in The Times.

== Death ==
Lesser died in London in 2015 at the age of 71. In December 2015, coroner Andrew Walker at Barnet Coroners Court ruled that Lesser died from asphyxiation. Evidence was given that Lesser had suffered from depression for "many years". He had a heart bypass in 1999 and in June 2015 had been told that he had terminal lung cancer. He left a note for his wife and friends.
