= High-functioning autism =

Historical autism classification

- Other names: Sukhareva syndrome
- Specialty: Psychiatry
- Symptoms: Trouble with social interaction, impaired communication, restricted interests, repetitive behavior
- Complications: Social isolation, employment problems, family stress, bullying, self-harm
- Usual onset: By age two or three
- Duration: Lifelong
- Causes: Genetic and environmental factors
- Diagnostic method: Based on behavior and developmental history
- Differential diagnosis: Asperger syndrome, attention deficit hyperactivity disorder, Tourette syndrome, anxiety disorder, bipolar disorder, obsessive–compulsive disorder, major depressive disorder
- Management: Behavioral therapy, speech therapy, psychotropic medication

High-functioning autism (HFA) was historically an autism classification to describe a person who exhibited no intellectual disability but otherwise showed autistic traits, such as differences in social interaction, communication, and sensory processing. The term was typically applied to verbal autistic people of at least average intelligence. However, many in medical and autistic communities have called to stop using the term, finding it simplistic and unindicative of the difficulties some autistic people face.

HFA has never been included in either the American Psychiatric Association's Diagnostic and Statistical Manual of Mental Disorders (DSM) or the World Health Organization's International Classification of Diseases (ICD), the two major classification and diagnostic guidelines for psychiatric conditions. The DSM-5-TR subtypes autism into three levels based on support needs. Autism Level 1 has the least support needs and corresponds most closely with the "high-functioning" identifier.

== Characterization ==
The term "high-functioning autism" was used in a manner similar to Asperger syndrome, another outdated classification. The defining characteristic recognized by psychologists was a significant delay in the development of early speech and language skills, before the age of three years. The term Asperger syndrome typically excluded a general language delay. Other differences were noted in features of high-functioning autism and Asperger syndrome in a study of 112 children in Germany.

HFA is not a recognised diagnosis by the American Psychiatric Association or the World Health Organization; however, HFA was previously used in clinical settings to describe cases of autism spectrum disorder where indicators suggested an intelligence quotient (IQ) of 70 or greater.

=== Comorbidities ===
With the notable exception of intellectual disabilities, which were not part of HFA, comorbidities found in HFA populations reflected those found in autism. Between 40 and 55% of individuals with autism also have an intellectual disability. Studies that looked specifically at HFA have examined anxiety, bipolar disorder, Tourette syndrome, attention deficit hyperactivity disorder (ADHD), and obsessive–compulsive disorder (OCD). Both HFA and OCD have abnormalities associated with serotonin.

== See also ==
- Autism therapies
- Causes of autism
- Diagnosis of autism
