= Double empathy problem =

Psychological theory regarding individuals on the autism spectrum

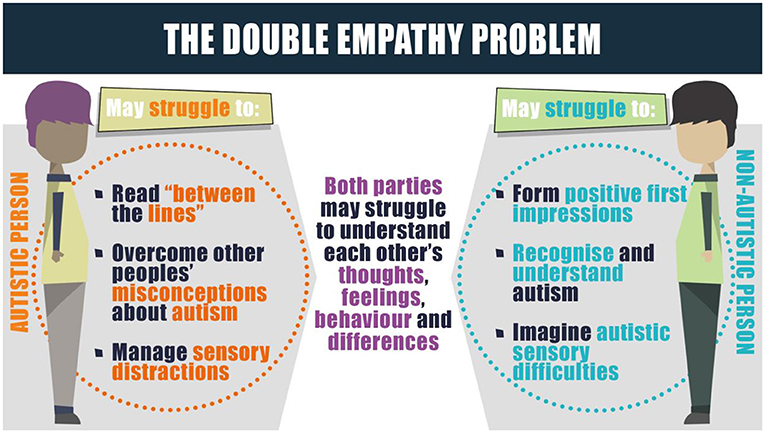
Both autistic and non-autistic people can find it difficult to empathize with each other. The fact that both people in the interaction have trouble understanding and empathizing is why the theory is called the "double empathy problem".

The double empathy problem is a psychological and sociological theory first coined in 2012 by Damian Milton, an autistic autism researcher. This theory proposes that many of the difficulties autistic individuals face when socializing with non-autistic individuals are due, in part, to mismatch and a lack of mutual understanding between the two groups, meaning that most autistic people struggle to understand and empathize with non-autistic people, whereas most non-autistic people also struggle to understand and empathize with autistic people. This lack of mutual understanding may stem from bidirectional differences in dispositions (e.g., communication style, social-cognitive characteristics), and experiences between autistic and non-autistic individuals, as opposed to always being an inherent deficit. It has been suggested that it is the mutual responsibility of autistic and non-autistic individuals to overcome the two-way empathy and communication challenges.

Apart from findings that generally demonstrated mismatch effects (e.g., in empathy and mentalizing/theory of mind/mind-reading), some studies have provided evidence for matching effects between autistic individuals, although findings for matching effects with experimental methods are more mixed with both supportive and non-supportive findings. Some studies from the 2010s and 2020s have shown that most autistic individuals are able to socialize and communicate effectively, empathize or mentalize adequately or effectively, (Note: Attributed to multiple sources:) build better rapport, and display social reciprocity with most other autistic individuals. A 2025 systematic review of 52 papers found that most autistic people have generally positive interpersonal relations and communication experiences when interacting with most autistic people, and autistic-autistic interactions were generally associated with better quality of life (e.g., mental health and emotional well-being) across various domains. This theory and subsequent findings challenge the commonly held belief that the social skills of all autistic individuals are inherently and universally impaired across contexts, as well as the theory of "mind-blindness" proposed by prominent autism researcher Simon Baron-Cohen in the mid-1990s, which suggested that empathy and theory of mind are universally impaired in autistic individuals.

In recognition of the findings that support the double empathy theory, Baron-Cohen positively acknowledged the theory and related findings in multiple autism research articles, including a 2025 paper on the impact of self-disclosure on improving empathy of non-autistic people towards autistic people to bridge the "double empathy gap" as well as a 2026 empirical study that partially supports double empathy theory, as well as on podcasts and a documentary since the late 2010s. In a 2017 research paper partly co-authored by Milton and Baron-Cohen, the problem of mutual incomprehension between autistic people and non-autistic people was mentioned.

The double empathy concept and related concepts such as bidirectional social interaction have been supported by or partially supported by a substantial number of studies in the 2010s and 2020s, with mostly consistent findings in mismatch effects as well as some supportive but also mixed and non-supportive findings in matching effects between autistic people. The theory and related concepts have the potential to shift goals of interventions (e.g., more emphasis on bridging the double empathy gap and improving intergroup relations to enhance social interaction outcomes as well as peer support services to promote well-being) and public psychoeducation or stigma reduction regarding autism. (Note: Attributed to multiple sources:)

== History ==
=== Development and spread of mind-blindness theory ===
Earlier studies on autism regarding theory of mind and empathy had concluded that a lack of theory of mind was one of the core deficits of autism. The most popular of these studies were those led by Simon Baron-Cohen in the 1980s and 1990s, who used the term "mind-blindness" to describe his theory in an attempt to empirically explain the tendency of autistic people to avoid eye contact, proposing a homogeneous explanation of autism as due to either a lack of theory of mind or developmental delay in theory of mind in early childhood. Some have additionally described the supposed social impairment present in autistic people as "an extreme form of egocentrism with the resulting lack of consideration for others".

Mind-blindness implies an inability to make sense of and predict another person's behavior, and to attribute mental states such as knowledge, beliefs, desires, emotions, and intentions to oneself and others. The claim that autistic people lack theory of mind is taught across a wide range of psychology textbooks and promoted by over 75% of the top 500 scholarly articles indexed for "theory of mind" and "autism" on Google Scholar, serving as one of psychology's widely promoted topics throughout psychological literature, practice, and instruction. Mind-blindness has also been embraced by scholars in other disciplinary areas such as sociology, philosophy, economics, anthropology, robotics, and narratology.

=== Problems with earlier studies on theory of mind and empathy in autism ===
The mind-blindness hypothesis, in addition to being questioned shortly after its publication, has faced a great deal of criticism from the scientific community over the years, in response to the replication studies (mostly the false-belief tasks) that have failed to reveal significant differences in theory of mind between autistic and non-autistic participants, as well as the growing body of evidence for the high degree of heterogeneity in autistic brains at a neurobiological level.

There have been developments of new theory-of-mind measures when existing measures were perceived by some researchers as inadequate. There have been some successful replications demonstrating differences in theory of mind and empathy with some measures such as the Frith–Happé Animations Test, Baron-Cohen's "Reading the Mind in the Eyes" task, and self-report empathy questionnaires – which have been criticized for being vague and imprecise as well as not considering social interaction contexts, reference groups, and the substantially lowered social-desirability bias of autistic individuals. In addition, several independent teams have repetitively failed to replicate highly cited and widely taught findings with picture-sequencing tasks and false-belief tasks such as the Sally–Anne test. Such mixed and inconsistent findings with many different measures have raised doubts regarding the generalizability and validity of the mind-blindness theory of autism.

Furthermore, autism intervention research based on theory of mind has shown little efficacy, and theory-of-mind experiments typically fail to take into account the fact that autistic people have different sensory experiences, which vary between autistic individuals, than non-autistic people. Academics have also noted that many autistic children and adults pass some theory-of-mind tasks but performances vary substantially between diverse tasks and between autistic individuals; hence, Baron-Cohen's earlier repeated assertion of mind-blindness being a universal characteristic of autism across contexts has also been called into question by other researchers since the 1990s. While Baron-Cohen has revised his understanding, his well-powered and large-sample studies have found substantial heterogeneity in empathy and theory of mind among autistic people, with lower performances or scores in theory-of-mind and empathy tasks among autistic people on average, but also a substantial proportion (around 40–60%) of autistic people showing "unimpaired" or even above-average performances in some rather controversial theory-of-mind and empathy measures. Similar results have been consistently demonstrated by other research teams.

Additionally, it has been argued that many professionals and, likewise, parents seem to have neglected that reciprocity needs to be mutual and symmetrical. For example, John Constantino's Social Responsiveness Scale, a 2002 quantitative measure of social reciprocity in children which has since been used extensively in autism research, consisted of the item that asks whether the child "is regarded by other children as odd or weird", which, although seeming to indicate a lack of social or emotional reciprocity in the regarder, is used instead to indicate a lack of social or emotional reciprocity in the target child. Several other items in the questionnaire, such as the one that asks whether the child "is not well coordinated in physical activities", seem completely unrelated to reciprocity.

=== Counter-theory to mind-blindness ===
Around the early 2010s, academics began to suggest that some studies of theory-of-mind and empathy tests may have misinterpreted autistic people having difficulty understanding non-autistic or neurotypical people as being an intrinsic social-cognitive deficit present in autistic individuals. They argued that it seemed more likely that autistic people were specifically having trouble understanding neurotypical people in some contexts, due to differences in experiences, interaction/communication style, and social cognition between the two groups. The theory of the double empathy problem was coined in 2012 by Damian Milton as a counter-theory to mind-blindness in an effort to explain this phenomenon of mutual misunderstanding, defined as follows:

The "double empathy problem": a disjuncture in reciprocity between two differently disposed social actors which becomes more marked the wider the disjuncture in dispositional perceptions of the lifeworld – perceived as a breach in the "natural attitude" of what constitutes "social reality" for "non-autistic spectrum" people and yet an everyday and often traumatic experience for "autistic people".

The claim that autism is characterized by a lack of social or emotional reciprocity has become a truism in academia; for instance, in a 2004 research article examining a hypothesized autism susceptibility gene, the opening line simply stated, without any scientific citations or supporting data, that "impaired reciprocal social interaction is one of the core features of autism". The double empathy theory, subsequent findings, and findings in the broader theory of mind and empathy literature in the 21st century contest common assumptions about autistic people in the fields of psychology and psychiatry, which are often riddled with information regarding autism and theory of mind (e.g., autistic people are universally deficient in empathy or theory of mind) that is outdated, overgeneralized, empirically questionable with inconsistent findings, and potentially societally harmful, but still often assumed by some researchers, educators, students, and practitioners as factual.

While concepts or ideas similar to double empathy had existed in prior publications (e.g., a 1988 letter to the editor by autistic self-advocate Jim Sinclair), Milton named and significantly expanded on it. Since 2015, there has been an increasing number of research studies, including experimental studies, qualitative research, and real-life social interaction studies, many of which are emerging under the banner of critical autism studies and neurodiversity paradigm, supporting or partially supporting the double empathy theory.

The double empathy theory has been supported or positively recognized by various autism researchers, including Catherine Crompton, Morton Ann Gernsbacher, Baron-Cohen himself, Elizabeth Pellicano, and Sue Fletcher-Watson, the editor-in-chief of the academic journal Autism. The theory has also been approached by research projects in various disciplinary areas, including but not limited to psychology, sociology, philosophy, neuroscience, linguistics, film studies, and design.

== Double empathy and bidirectional social-interaction or communication studies ==
=== Interpersonal rapport, empathy, and social-interaction or communication effectiveness ===
It has been suggested that non-autistic people tend to have a poor understanding of autistic people and lack emotional empathy for autistic people, just as autistic people may have a poor understanding of non-autistic people. Whilst autistic people sometimes have difficulties in understanding non-autistic people and struggle to socialize with non-autistic people, it is likely that most non-autistic people often hold negative stereotypes, views, and/or biases regarding autistic differences, and also struggle to understand autistic people's communication, emotions, and intentions, resulting in and contributing to this "double empathy problem". Some studies have found that non-autistic individuals may have an implicit bias against autistic individuals when evaluating recorded conversations and narrations, and will typically rate non-autistic individuals in such conditions more favorably.

Studies from the 2010s and 2020s that have used autistic-autistic pairs to test interpersonal rapport, empathy, and communication effectiveness in adults have shown that autistic adults generally perform better in empathy, rapport, and communication effectiveness when paired with other autistic adults, that interpersonal rapport may be stronger in autistic-autistic interactions than in those between autistic and neurotypical people, and that autistic people may be able to understand and predict each other's thoughts and motivations better than neurotypical people as well as possibly autistic close relatives.

=== The importance of social reciprocity ===
One major factor influencing communication effectiveness is social reciprocity. Research from the 1980s and 1990s has indicated that when professionals, peers, and parents are taught to act reciprocally to autistic children, non-autistic children are considerably more likely to reciprocate with autistic children, who end up becoming more responsive. Non-autistic children can demonstrate reciprocity via imitation, which improves social responsiveness in all children, including autistic children; when a random person imitates an autistic child engaging in object manipulation by manipulating a duplicate object in the same way that the child does, the child makes longer and more frequent eye contact with the person. Similarly, when mothers imitate their autistic children's manipulation of toys, the children not only gaze longer and more frequently at their mothers, but also engage in more exploratory and creative behavior with the toys, on top of showing considerably more positive affect. Finding common ground between autistic and non-autistic individuals, such as through literature, can bridge the "double empathy" gap and create a "double empathy understanding."

In contrast, in a 1992 study on reciprocal interactions, non-autistic preschoolers, called "peer tutors", were taught to prompt for the verbal labels of preferred toys from autistic target children; the peer tutors were told to "wait for the target child to initiate a request for a toy", "ask the target child for the label of the toy", "give the toy to the target child when he labeled it", and "praise the correct answer". None of the autistic children maintained their initiation with the peer tutors even after the training sessions were completed, which was likely because their interaction was neither mutual nor symmetrical. When social interaction is neither mutual nor symmetrical between autistic and non-autistic peers, a double empathy problem occurs, which is likely exacerbated through professionals, peers, and parents neglecting the reciprocal nature of reciprocity.

=== Bullying and subsequent masking ===
Some researchers have argued that autistic people likely understand non-autistic people to a higher degree than vice versa, due to the frequency of masking – i.e., the conscious or subconscious suppression of autistic behaviors and the compensation of difficulties in social interaction by autistic people with the goal of being perceived as neurotypical. Masking begins at a young age as a coping strategy, partly to avoid harassment and bullying, which are highly common experiences for autistic children and adults. High rates of peer victimization are also seen in autistic children and adults.

Whilst many health professionals and researchers have argued from time to time that autism is characterized by a lack of social or emotional reciprocity, the bullying and victimization targeted at autistic people by non-autistic people, along with the problem of ableism in autism research, has been viewed as a demonstration of non-autistic people's lack of social or emotional reciprocity towards autistic people, further suggesting what Milton has described to be a "disjuncture in reciprocity" (i.e., the presence of a "double empathy gap") between autistic and non-autistic people.

=== Anthropomorphism and understanding for animals ===
An area of social-cognitive strength in autistic people centers upon anthropomorphism. A 2018 study has shown that autistic people are likely more prone to object personification, suggesting that autistic empathy may be more complex and all-encompassing, contrary to the popular belief that autistic people lack empathy. Whilst neurotypical participants have outperformed autistic participants in the Reading the Mind in the Eyes test designed by Baron-Cohen in 2001, autistic participants have outperformed neurotypical participants in a cartoon version of the said test in a 2022 study, supporting the view of social-cognitive differences rather than deficits in the autistic population.

Some autistic people also appear to possess a heightened understanding, empathy, and sensitivity towards animals, once again suggesting social-cognitive differences in autistic people, but not global deficits.

== Autistic perspectives and dehumanizing research ==
Autistic theory of mind, argued to have facilitated the release of cognitive resources, is typically based on the use of rules and logic and may be modulated by differences in thinking. If autistic people were inherently poor at theory of mind and social communication, an interaction between a pair of autistic people would logically be more challenging than one between an autistic and neurotypical person.

Many autistic activists and a growing number of autism researchers have shown support for the double empathy concept, and have argued that some past studies and articles regarding theory of mind and empathy in autism (especially the universal core deficit version by Baron-Cohen from the 1980s to 2011) have served to stigmatize autistic people, place the responsibility for autistic-neurotypical misunderstandings solely on autistic people, and dehumanize autistic people by portraying them as unempathetic. Many autistic activists have advocated for the inclusion of autistic people in autism research, promoting the slogan "nothing about us without us". In addition, autistic individuals may tend to have a reliable and scientific understanding of autism that is also less stigmatizing, contrary to the implication that autistic people lack the ability to infer to their selves.

Research has shown that autistic people are more likely to be dehumanized by non-autistic people, and first-hand accounts of autism research, including autoethnographies, blogs, commentaries, and editorials, have described autism research to often be dehumanizing to autistic people. Furthermore, autistic people are said to be "less domesticated" at morphological, physiological, and behavioral levels, and have integrity equivalent to that of non-human animals. Autism has been described as an epidemic, and in some cases, lack of empathy is used to link autism with terrorism. Autistic people are also said to be an economic burden, and extensive arguments supporting the use of eugenics in autism have been published, with exceptions being made only for those who are economically productive and normative enough to not make others uncomfortable.

As a result of this dehumanization, the lack of understanding and resultant stigma and marginalization felt by autistic people in social settings may negatively impact upon their mental health, employment, accessibility to education and services, and experiences with the criminal justice system. Autistic people have increased premature mortality rates and one of the leading causes of death in autistic people is suicide, which is likely exacerbated by this stigma and marginalization. Additionally, many autistic people often feel trapped by the stereotypes this largely non-autistic society has of autism, and have reported changing their behavior (i.e., masking) as a result of those stereotypes. Because a lack of theory of mind is believed to impair autistic people's understanding of their selves and other people, the claim that autistic people lack theory of mind is seen to dispute their autonomy, devalue their self-determination, and undermine their credibility.

== Limitations and future directions ==
The literature on double empathy is still relatively young, and the generalizability of double empathy and bidirectional interaction findings to younger autistic children as well as autistic people with an intellectual disability, speech-language impairment, and/or higher support needs is very uncertain, may be confounding, and will require further research. Another limitation is most studies on double empathy and bidirectional social interaction are based on western samples, and studies with non-western samples will be worthwhile.

Milton agrees that there currently remain large gaps in this area of research. The vast majority of studies on double empathy, bidirectional communication, and socialization so far have not included autistic children and autistic people who are nonspeaking or have an intellectual disability. There exists a high degree of comorbidity between autism and intellectual disability; roughly 30% of autistic people have an intellectual disability, while just roughly 1–3% of the global population or lower has an intellectual disability. In addition, roughly 20–30% of autistic children are either nonspeaking or minimally speaking. Glass & Yuill (2023) found support for the presence of similar or higher social synchrony between autistic pairs compared to non-autistic pairs under certain conditions, with participants including autistic children and autistic people who are nonspeaking or minimally speaking.

Moreover, double empathy and bidirectional communication studies typically fail to take into account the vast individual variations (heterogeneity) of autistic people and factors like masking, which may possibly interfere with autistic people's ability to communicate and empathize with one another. Acknowledging these differences which may affect communication within and between autistic and non-autistic groups, Gillespie-Smith et al. (2024) suggested a need to (re)frame the double empathy problem to be understood as a "spectrum of understanding", which sees double empathy in the context of a continuum of neurocommunicative learning, situated between poles of understanding and misunderstanding. In this sense, the spectrum of understanding simply illustrates that as individuals learn more about each other from direct interaction, their relationships tend to deepen, their comprehension of each other increases, and they become more able to empathize with each other.

Conceptual replications and further studies on double empathy are needed in different groups, including siblings of autistic people, non-autistic pupils in schools including autistic peers, late-diagnosed autistic adults, parents of autistic children, and autism service providers.

Emphasizing that empathy and reciprocity are a "two-way street", Milton and many other researchers propose that further autism research should focus on bridging the double empathy gap by empowering autistic individuals, building rapport and appreciation for their worldview, educating non-autistic people about what being autistic means, and moving towards a more continuous understanding of neurodiversity. It has also been suggested that the medical model of autism – the traditional and dominant model of autism in which autism is viewed as a disorder and deficit – is problematic due to its approach being too narrow, individualistic, and deficit-based, as well as how its messaging could contribute to ableism, prejudice, and stigma towards autistic people, further widening this double empathy gap.

== Triple empathy problem ==
Autistic individuals are more likely to face significant health disparities, including a higher prevalence of co-occurring health conditions and a lower life expectancy compared to their neurotypical peers, and thus are more likely to use emergency services. Despite increased awareness of these health inequities, many autistic people encounter substantial barriers when accessing healthcare services. Shaw et al. (2023) conducted a qualitative study involving 1,248 autistic adults to investigate these challenges, revealing a complex interplay of factors that contribute to adverse health outcomes. Key themes emerged from the participants' experiences, such as early barriers to care, communication mismatches, feelings of doubt from both patients and healthcare providers, a sense of helplessness and fear in navigating the system, and a tendency toward healthcare avoidance – each contributing to significant health risks.

Shaw et al. (2023) constructed a model illustrating a chronological journey that outlines how barriers to healthcare access can lead to detrimental health outcomes for autistic individuals. Their work emphasizes the necessity of amplifying autistic voices in discussions about healthcare and highlights the relevance of the double empathy problem within medical contexts, thereby proposing the concept of a "triple empathy problem". The triple empathy problem situates the double empathy problem into a medical context. Several participants in the study additionally indicated struggles with a lack of predictability, environmental and sensory challenges, and diagnostic overshadowing as reasons for healthcare avoidance.

This expanded framework, further elaborated by Josefson (2024), encompasses:

- the difficulty neurotypical people have relating to or understanding the needs of neurodivergent people,
- the difficulty neurodivergent people have relating to or understanding the needs of neurotypical people, and
- the difficulty urban planners and other designers, whether of products, services, technology, places, systems or processes etc., have finding solutions that equitably balance the needs of all community members.

Triple empathy is associated with the concept and principles of universal design, which aims to create environments and services that are accessible and beneficial to everyone, regardless of their neurotype. Fostering neuroinclusive design not only accommodates but actively embraces the diverse perspectives and experiences of all individuals.

== Quadruple empathy problem ==
The transition through menopause can be particularly difficult for autistic people, exacerbating existing communication barriers and experiences of misunderstanding in medical contexts. Participants from a study by Brady et al. (2024) described profound communication challenges that echoed their earlier experiences during puberty and menarche, periods in which they also struggled to articulate their needs and experiences due to their neurodivergent perspectives. Brady et al. (2024) coined the term "quadruple empathy problem" to not only reflect the challenges autistic individuals face in communicating their needs but also emphasize the impact of medical misogyny – i.e., systemic biases in healthcare that may dismiss or undermine the experiences of neurodivergent women, who may find themselves navigating a healthcare landscape lacking in appropriate levels of support and understanding, further leading to feelings of desperation and the need for self-advocacy, such as seeking private healthcare or educating medical personnel about their unique experiences.

== See also ==
- Discrimination against autistic people
- Empathy gap
- Epistemic injustice
- Inclusion (disability rights)
- Intercultural communication
- Medical model of disability
- Perspective-taking
- Social model of disability
- The Fox and the Stork
