= Robert Chapman (philosopher) =

English philosopher and writer

- Born: 1989 or 1990

Academic background
- Education: University of Essex (Ph.D., 2018)
- Thesis: Autism, Neurodiversity, and the Good Life: On the very possibility of autistic thriving

Robert Chapman is an English philosopher, teacher and writer, best known for their work on neurodiversity studies and the philosophy of disability. They were the world's first assistant professor of critical neurodiversity studies, working in that role at Durham University between 2023 and 2026.

== Early life and education ==
Chapman was born in 1989 or 1990. During their childhood, they lived in low-income housing in London and, later, elsewhere in England. They struggled with learning problems and dropped out of school at age 15. After living with friends, Chapman became homeless for a time. Due to struggling outside in winter conditions, Chapman entered the foster care system.

During the 2000s, Chapman studied philosophy at the University of Southampton. In 2013, after learning they are autistic, they completed their master's degree and began their doctorate at the University of Essex with a focus on neurodiversity as a theory, developing a concept of autistic thriving. In 2018, they defended their thesis, Autism, Neurodiversity and the Good Life, which was funded by the Shirley Foundation.

== Career ==
Prior to obtaining their doctorate, Chapman worked in a number of manual labour and factory jobs. Following their doctorate at the University of Essex, they worked at Bristol University as a temporary lecturer, then as a Vice Chancellor's Research Fellow at the University of Bristol (2019), working on neurodiversity and well-being. From 2021, Chapman then served as a senior lecturer in education at Sheffield Hallam University. They have also worked at King's College London. In 2023, they were invited as a Visiting Fellow at the Institute for Advanced Studies in the Humanities at the University of Edinburgh. In September of that year, they became the world's first assistant professor of critical neurodiversity studies, at Durham University, where they worked until 2026.

In 2023, Chapman published their first book, Empire of Normality: Neurodiversity and Capitalism, which focuses on developing a Marxist perspective on neurodiversity. With Sue Fletcher-Watson they co-authored Neurodiversity (2026) for Oxford University Press's Very Short Introductions series. Chapman's third book, Pure Fantasies: The Rise of Health Fascism, will be published in 2027. Along with a range of academic publications, Chapman has written on the neurodiversity paradigm and movement for popular publications including Psychology Today and Boston Review.

== Positions ==
=== Neurodiversity ===
Chapman defines the neurodiversity movement as a social justice movement that aims to change the way mental disability and neurodevelopmental conditions are observed with the goal of being perceived in a socio-ecological approach to disability. They make frequent references to authors such as Nick Walker and Judy Singer and those authors' proposals for conceptualizing neurodiversity. Chapman argues that, historically, neurodiversity as a movement has had a political approach based on identity, which, from their perspective, is a liberal view.

Chapman argues that the correct interpretation of the concept of neurodiversity contributes to the further development of its theoretical and practical side, and that its multiple definitions are evolving over time. Much of their work has been on the fundamental concepts of neurodiversity as they pertain to philosophy of science, most notably their development of an ecological model of mental functioning and analysis of the metaphysics of diagnosis. They have also discussed the relationship of neurodiversity to explanatory models of disability, such as the social model of disability and the value-neutral model proposed by philosopher Elizabeth Barnes.

Gerald Roche has argued that Chapman's definition of neurodivergent Marxism is “an intersectional approach to analysing how capitalism produces and maintains multiple forms of oppression, to ensure that new sites of extraction can be constantly identified and exploited in the endless pursuit of capital accumulation.” Awais Aftab has said that Chapman's work “has had a substantial impact on my own thinking, and their writings have consistently forced me, and many others, to rethink long-standing assumptions related to pathology and medical care.” Julie Dind stated in a review of the book Neurodiversity Studies: A New Critical Paradigm, which included Chapman's writings, that one of their essays successfully challenges the tragic perspective on autism promoted by medicine. In 2023, Tiago Abreu argued that Chapman's work manages to provide an effective state-of-the-art and historical contextualization of neurodiversity.

=== Psychiatry ===
In various articles and especially in their book Empire of Normality: Neurodiversity and Capitalism, Chapman has criticized how psychiatrists and the field of psychiatry deal with the issue of mental health and disability. In this book, they build on existing work that urges the need for alternatives to psychiatry and clinical psychology, led by and for neurodivergent people alongside those who identify as mad, psychiatric survivors, and disabled. They also note radical psychiatrists who have influenced their approach, such as Franco Basaglia and Franz Fanon.

Chapman has also critiqued the libertarian right Szaszian tradition, which follows the work of Thomas Szasz, in anti-psychiatry and critical psychiatry. In 2022, Chapman said that “a lot of critical psychiatry today is about emphasizing how people with mental health diagnoses are not 'really' disabled–not like 'really' disabled people–because mental health is a political issue rather than a medical issue. For me, however, all issues concerning health and disability are political issues; so, that is a false binary". Chapman has also emphasized how Szasz saw himself as a proponent of Hayekian neoliberalism.

John Cromby, for Mad in the UK, responded critically to Chapman's approach in Empire of Normality, arguing that the work “misrepresents antipsychiatry” in terms of historical context and use of the term, and argued that it “tends towards idealism.” Sam Fellowes for Philosophy of Medicine described Chapman's discussion of anti-psychiatry as “nuanced and helpful”, providing a balanced view of anti-psychiatry which distinguishes between different ideologies in the tradition, and acknowledges that even those the author opposes raised important issues.

== Personal life ==
Chapman is non-binary and uses they/them pronouns.

== Books ==
- Chapman, Robert (20 November 2023). Empire of Normality: Neurodiversity and Capitalism. Pluto Press. ISBN 978-0-7453-4866-7.
- Chapman, Robert; Fletcher-Watson, Sue (26 March 2026). Neurodiversity: A Very Short Introduction. Oxford: Oxford University Press. ISBN 9780198876519.
- Chapman, Robert (April 2027). Pure Fantasies: The Rise of Health Fascism (PDF). Pluto Press. ISBN 978-0-7453-5354-8.
