= Rosqvist =

Rosqvist is a Swedish surname. People with this surname include:

- Ewy Rosqvist-von Korff (1929–2024), Swedish rally driver
- Hanna Bertilsdotter Rosqvist, Swedish academic
- Karl Rosqvist, Swedish drummer
- Matilda Rosqvist (born 1989), Swedish footballer
