= Yergeau =

Yergeau is a surname. Notable people with the surname include:

- M. Remi Yergeau (born 1984), American academic in the fields of rhetoric, composition, and neurodiversity studies
- Pierre Yergeau (born 1957), Canadian novelist
