= Neurodiversity and labor rights =

Intersection of mental functions and occupational practices

Neurodivergent people present distinct issues in labor rights. They may individually or as a demographic have occupational preferences or requests for accommodation which differ from neurotypical workers. While some neurodivergent people may need workplace support in a medical model of disability, other people may only want cultural understanding in a social model of disability.

== Demographics ==
The earliest examined groups of neurodivergent workers were people with attention deficit hyperactivity disorder and autistic people. Later studied conditions include developmental coordination disorder and dyslexia. After occupational researchers began to consider these conditions collectively, it became easier to include other kinds of neurological modes in workplace considerations. One model for discussing all of these groups is to ask individuals how they identify and want to be known. Another model is simply thinking of some people as "neurominorities", and not trying to get more detail, so long as people have what they need to do their work effectively.

A 2022 report estimated that 22% of workers are neurodivergent.

Historically, neurodivergent people have experienced unemployment much more often than neurotypical people.

== Advantages ==
Neurodivergent people as a demographic may have advantages and skills which neurotypical people do not have. A common advantage is difference of perspective; because the demographic has a different lived experience, individuals in that demographic can speak for themselves to share opinions which often differ from neurotypical people.

It also can happen that certain individuals or groups of neurodivergent people develop uncommon skillsets which manifest when they get workplace accommodation.

== Accommodation ==
In the mid-2010s various large multinational corporations began developing policy on occupational neurodiversity. Previously, organizations either did not discuss the issue, or if they addressed it, then it was a sort of disability accommodation. The changing practice was to practice cultural understanding for neurodiversity as a social difference or personal identity. In this framing, neuroatypical conditions could be recognized as another form of diversity comparable to gender, sexual orientation, or race. Pilot programs began in advocacy for autistic workers, because there was already an identified labor pool of job candidates who were autistic and could work effectively with support.

In the United States, workers become eligible for reasonable accommodation through the Americans with Disabilities Act of 1990 after they disclose to their employer that they have a particular medical condition. Because neuroatypical conditions are often not understood or recognized, employers may not provide neurodiversity accommodations.

In 2015 Ernst & Young established a program to recruit autistic workers.

Common accommodations include providing single-person offices, giving workers control over the lighting of the room in which they work, and providing options for the employee to avoid being in a crowd or to take breaks alone in a quiet place.

== See also ==
- Autism-friendly
- Discrimination against autistic people
- Employment of autistic people
- Neurodiversity In Tech
