= Nick Walker (scholar) =

American scholar and author

Academic background
- Education: Berkeley City College (AA); California Institute of Integral Studies (BA, MA, PhD)
- Thesis: Transformative Somatic Practices and Autistic Potentials: An Autoethnographic Exploration (2019)
- Doctoral advisor: Alfonso Montuori
- Other advisors: Ian J. Grand; Shoshana Simons; M. Remi Yergeau

Academic work
- Discipline: Psychology; Queer theory; Psychedelic studies
- Institutions: California Institute of Integral Studies
- Notable works: Neuroqueer Heresies

Nick Walker is an American scholar, author, webcomic creator, and aikido teacher, known for contributing to the development of the neurodiversity paradigm, establishing the foundations of neuroqueer theory, and writing the essay collection Neuroqueer Heresies and the urban fantasy webcomic Weird Luck. Walker is a professor of psychology and psychedelic studies at California Institute of Integral Studies.

== Early life and education ==
Walker grew up in a low-income housing project in New Jersey, spent portions of his young adulthood homeless, and began attending college in his thirties. He received an Associate of Arts in liberal arts from Berkeley City College and then attended California Institute of Integral Studies, where he received a Bachelor of Arts in interdisciplinary studies, a Master of Arts in counseling psychotherapy, and a Doctor of Philosophy in transformative studies.

Walker began practicing aikido at the age of 12, inspired by Samuel R. Delany's novella Babel-17. He started teaching aikido while still in his late teens, and continued to practice and teach even during periods of homelessness.

== Career ==
Walker is a professor at California Institute of Integral Studies, where he teaches in the Bachelor of Science in Psychology program––the curriculum of which he helped to design––as well as the Somatic Psychology MA program. In 2024, CIIS announced that Walker would be one of the principal architects and founding faculty members of their new Bachelor of Science program in Psychedelic Studies.

Walker teaches aikido at the Aiki Arts Center in Berkeley, California, and holds a 7th degree black belt.

Walker is managing editor of the worker-owned independent publishing house Autonomous Press, and a consulting editor for the journal World Futures. His scholarly work focuses on the "edges and intersections" of somatic psychology, transpersonal psychology, queer theory, neurodiversity, transformative learning, and creativity.

=== Writing ===
Walker initially began writing about neurodiversity and developing his conceptualization of the neurodiversity paradigm in 2003, in online autistic activist forums. His first piece on the neurodiversity paradigm to appear in print was the essay “Throw Away the Master’s Tools: Liberating Ourselves from the Pathology Paradigm”, published in 2012. From 2013 to 2017, Walker published a series of essays on neurodiversity on his website (initially titled Neurocosmopolitanism and later retitled Neuroqueer), before shifting to publishing his work in more traditional academic venues.

In 2021, Walker published his book Neuroqueer Heresies: Notes on the Neurodiversity Paradigm, Autistic Empowerment, and Postnormal Possibilities, collecting his existing essays along with 120 pages of new material reflecting the subsequent evolution of his views.

Walker has also written and published speculative fiction stories set in the same universe as the Weird Luck webcomic, and co-edited multiple volumes of the annual Spoon Knife story anthology for Autonomous Press.

=== Weird Luck ===
Walker writes an urban fantasy webcomic called Weird Luck, co-written by speculative fiction author Andrew M. Reichart and illustrated by artist Mike Bennewitz.

Weird Luck is set in the city of Tal Sharnis, an "interdimensional urban disaster zone" where reality itself is unstable. The protagonist, Tyger Sojac, is an agent of the Reality Patrol, an organization dedicated to "maintaining the integrity of reality". Though highly capable, Sojac suffers from a condition called Chronic Synchronicity Syndrome, also known as Weird Luck, which causes improbable events to occur around her.

=== Paratheatrical research ===
From 1996 through 2015, Walker was a core member of Paratheatrical Research, a Jungian-informed experimental physical theatre group run by director Antero Alli. He has observed that for sufficiently experienced practitioners, Alli's ritual theatre techniques "can produce peak experiences … that are as intensely psychedelic as any LSD or psilocybin trip".

Walker appears in several of the underground films Alli directed and produced during these years, including Orphans of Delirium (2004), The Greater Circulation (2005), The Mind Is a Liar and a Whore (2007), To Dream of Falling Upwards (2011), and dreambody/earthbody (2012).

=== Neurodiversity paradigm ===
Walker has been a significant contributor to the development of the neurodiversity paradigm. According to Walker, the neurodiversity paradigm has three foundational principles:

1. "Neurodiversity—the diversity among minds—is a natural, healthy, and valuable form of human diversity."
2. "There is no 'normal' or 'right' style of human mind."
3. "The social dynamics that manifest in regard to neurodiversity are similar to the social dynamics that manifest in regard to other forms of human diversity."

He distinguishes the neurodiversity paradigm from what he calls the pathology paradigm, in which prevailing cultural norms of cognitive functioning are equated with health, and divergence from those norms is assumed to represent pathology.

Walker emphasizes that his formulation of the neurodiversity paradigm does not reject the idea of framing certain forms of neurodivergence as pathological and seeking to treat them. He opposes framing autism as a pathology on the grounds that approaching it as if it were a pathology does not effectively serve the goal of promoting autistic well-being. He names traumatic brain injury as one example of a form of neurodivergence that is appropriately viewed through a medical lens.

According to British philosopher and neurodiversity scholar Robert Chapman, Walker's formulation of the neurodiversity paradigm enabled "a broader analysis that goes far beyond autism", and "offered not just hope to countless neurodivergent people, but also an ideal to collectively work toward".

=== Neuroqueer theory ===
Walker originally coined the term neuroqueer in 2008, in a paper written for a graduate course in somatic psychology. The term was intended to encapsulate Walker's insight that neuronormativity was socially constructed and instilled like heteronormativity, and that "neuronormativity and heteronormativity are fundamentally entwined with one another, and therefore any significant queering of neuronormativity is also inevitably a queering of heteronormativity" and vice versa.

Walker's formulation of neuroqueer theory developed over time, and in 2014 was influenced by conversations with fellow scholars Athena Lynn Michaels-Dillon, who had also come up with the term neuroqueer independently, and M. Remi Yergeau, who had been exploring similar concepts and using the term neurological queerness. Walker wrote the first formal definition of neuroqueer in an essay titled "Neuroqueer: An Introduction", which he published on his website in 2015.

Yergeau's book Authoring Autism: On Rhetoric and Neurological Queerness (2018) made extensive use of the concept of neuroqueer. In 2021, Walker provided a comprehensive articulation of neuroqueer theory and its premises in an essay titled "A Horizon of Possibility: Some Notes on Neuroqueer Theory", which appears as the final and longest chapter of his book Neuroqueer Heresies.

According to Walker, "Neuroqueer Theory applies the framework of Queer Theory to the realm of neurodiversity, and expands the scope of Queer Theory to encompass gender, sexuality, and neurodiversity, as well as the intersections of gender and sexuality with neurodiversity." Drawing on the work of post-essentialist queer theorists like Judith Butler who frame binary cisheteronormative gender roles as modes of socially enforced performance, Walker argues that there's no such thing as a "neurotypical brain", and that neurotypicality is a socially learned and enforced performance entwined with the performance of cisheteronormativity.

Although the term neuroqueer has come into popular usage as an identity label, Walker maintains that this was never his intention, that neuroqueer "is not a mere synonym for neurodivergent, or for neurodivergent identity combined with queer identity", and that neuroqueer theory is "an approach to neurodiversity that radically departs from essentialist identity politics". He emphasizes that "neuroqueer is first and foremost a verb. Neuroqueering is a practice, or more accurately, a continually emergent and potentially infinite array of practices––modes of creatively subversive and transformative action in which anyone can choose to engage."

Robert Chapman writes that Walker's conceptualization of neuroqueering "has provided a new tool for combatting neuronormativity from within the constraints imposed by history and current material conditions. By queering the social world, new possibilities are carved out for the future, helping us not just challenge aspects of the current order but to start collectively imagining what a different world could be like."

=== Psychedelics ===
Walker has mentioned his history of psychedelic drug use, LSD in particular, and has presented on the intersection of somatic practices and psychedelic experience. In his writings on neurodiversity he has noted that long-term alterations in cognitive functioning induced by "heavy usage of psychedelic drugs" can be considered a form of acquired neurodivergence.

From 2012 to 2018, Walker collaborated with the Multidisciplinary Association for Psychedelic Studies (MAPS) on a double-blind placebo-controlled clinical study of the efficacy of MDMA-assisted psychotherapy for treating social anxiety in autistic adults. The study, which Walker helped to design, produced clinically significant positive results, with participants who received MDMA experiencing substantially greater reduction in anxiety symptoms, an improvement which was found to have persisted or increased at the six-month follow-up point. The study results were published in 2018 in the Swiss journal Psychopharmacology, in an article Walker co-authored with the MAPS research team.

Walker is a principal architect and founding faculty member of the Bachelor of Science program in Psychedelic Studies at California Institute of Integral Studies, the first accredited degree program in the world to offer Psychedelic Studies as a major for undergraduates.

== Personal life ==
Walker is married to fellow aikido teacher Azzia Walker; his father-in-law is psychologist Ofer Zur.

Walker has described himself as queer and written about exploring his femininity; he has used feminine pronouns in some of his past writings, but in early 2025 announced on social media that he was returning to the use of masculine pronouns professionally. He has written about being autistic and about his experiences of synesthesia.

== Publications ==
=== Books written ===
- Walker, Nick. Neuroqueer Heresies: Notes on the Neurodiversity Paradigm, Autistic Empowerment, and Postnormal Possibilities. Autonomous Press, 2021.

=== Books edited ===
- Walker, Nick, and Andrew M. Reichart, eds. Spoon Knife 3: Incursions. NeuroQueer Books, 2018.
- Reichart, Andrew M., Dora M. Raymaker, and Nick Walker, eds. Spoon Knife 5: Liminal. NeuroQueer Books, 2021.
- Walker, Nick, and Mike Jung, eds. Spoon Knife 7: Transitions. NeuroQueer Books, 2023.
- Walker, Nick, and Phil Smith, eds. Spoon Knife 8: Smoke and Mirrors. NeuroQueer Books, 2024.

=== Book chapters ===
- Walker, Nick. On Being Slippery. Towards an Archeology of the Soul, edited by Antero Alli. Vertical Pool, 2003.
- Walker, Nick. Throw Away the Master's Tools: Liberating Ourselves from the Pathology Paradigm. Loud Hands: Autistic People, Speaking, edited by Julia Bascom. Autistic Press, 2012.
- Walker, Nick. Foreword. Defiant, by Michael Scott Monje. Autonomous Press, 2015.
- Walker, Nick. This Is Autism. The Real Experts: Readings for Parents of Autistic Children, edited by Michelle Sutton. Autonomous Press, 2015.
- Walker, Nick. What Is Autism? The Real Experts: Readings for Parents of Autistic Children, edited by Michelle Sutton. Autonomous Press, 2015.
- Walker, Nick. Calvin and Clay, the Protective Manipulations of the Unconscious, and Friends of Ambiguous Ontological Status. Afterword. Imaginary Friends, by Michael Scott Monje. NeuroQueer Books, 2016.
- Walker, Nick. Somatics and Autistic Embodiment. Diverse Bodies, Diverse Practices: Toward an Inclusive Somatics, edited by Don Hanlon Johnson. North Atlantic Books, 2018.
- Walker, Nick, and Bonnie Burstow. Autistic and Mad. The Revolt Against Psychiatry: A Counterhegemonic Dialogue, edited by Bonnie Burstow. Palgrave Macmillan, 2019.
- Walker, Nick.The Use of Transformative Somatic Practices in Processes of Collective Imagination and Collaborative Future-Shaping. Routledge Handbook for Creative Futures, edited by Gabrielle Donnelly and Alfonso Montuori. Routledge, 2023.

=== Articles ===
- Walker, Nick, and Alicia Danforth. Treating Social Anxiety in Autistic Adults with MDMA-Assisted Psychotherapy. MAPS Bulletin, vol. 24, no. 1, Spring 2014, pp. 7–9.
- Danforth, Alicia, Charles S. Grob, Christopher Struble, Allison A. Feduccia, Nick Walker, Lisa Jerome, Berra Yazar-Klosinski, and Amy Emerson. Reduction in Social Anxiety After MDMA-Assisted Psychotherapy with Autistic Adults: A Randomized, Double-Blind, Placebo-Controlled Pilot Study. Psychopharmacology, vol. 235, no. 11, June 2018, pp. 3137–3148.
- Walker, Nick, and Dora M. Raymaker. Toward a Neuroqueer Future. Autism in Adulthood, vol. 3, no. 1, March 2021, pp. 5–10.
- Pukki, Heta, et al. Autistic Perspectives on the Future of Clinical Autism Research. Autism in Adulthood, vol. 4, no. 2, June 2022, pp. 93–101.
- Natri, Heini M., Carolyn R. Chapman, Síofra Heraty, Patrick Dwyer, Nick Walker, et al. Ethical Challenges in Autism Genomics: Recommendations for Researchers. European Journal of Medical Genetics, vol. 66, no. 9, September 2023, 104810.
- Botha, Monique, Robert Chapman, Morénike Giwa Onaiwu, Steven K. Kapp, Abs Stannard Ashley, and Nick Walker. The Neurodiversity Concept Was Developed Collectively: An Overdue Correction on the Origins of Neurodiversity Theory. Autism, March 2024, https://doi.org/10.1177/13623613241237871.
