= Vikram Jaswal =

American Developmental psychologist

- Occupation: Professor of Psychology

Academic background
- Education: Columbia University (BA) University of Edinburgh (MSc) Stanford University (MA, PhD)

Academic work
- Discipline: Psychology, Autism
- Sub-discipline: Developmental Psychology, Cognitive Psychology
- Institutions: University of Virginia

Vikram Kenneth Jaswal is a developmental psychologist known for his work on autism, particularly augmentative communication supports for nonspeaking autistic people. He holds the position of Professor of Psychology at the University of Virginia.

== Biography ==
Jaswal earned his B.A. in psychology from Columbia University in 1995. He then attended graduate school at the University of Edinburgh where he obtained his MSc in neuroscience. He then attended Stanford University, where he received his M.A. in psychology in 2000, and his PhD in developmental psychology in 2003. As a graduate student, Jaswal's research focused on word learning in young children. Jaswal's dissertation focused on how three and four-year-old children process linguistic labels assigned to anomalous objects, for which he received the National Institute of Mental Health National Research Service Award predoctoral research grant.

After receiving his PhD, Jaswal moved to the University of Virginia in 2003. His early research focused on cognitive development, particularly in the context of young children's learning. Sometime later, his daughter was diagnosed with autism, prompting Jaswal to change his research focus to studying the condition, particularly communication in non-speaking autistic people.

During his career, Jaswal has received funding from the Social Sciences and Humanities Research Council, the Jacobs Foundation, the Eunice Kennedy Shriver National Institute of Child Health and Human Development, and the National Institute of Mental Health.

In 2016, Jaswal and Tauna Szymanski wrote in The Washington Post that they decided to educate their daughter in the community rather than send her back to public school after learning that, for a third consecutive year, she would spend a least half of each school day in a segregated, self-contained classroom. They cited research supporting inclusive education for students with disabilities, including findings that students in regular classrooms can have greater access to learning opportunities, grade-level material, and connection to the school community when appropriate supports are provided.

== Research ==
Jaswal's initial research focused on learning in typically developing preschool-age children. Some of his early research provided evidence that sad children learn better than happy children. He began researching autism when his daughter was diagnosed with the condition.

Jaswal's recent research focuses on communication and social interaction in autism, including assisted and augmentative communication for nonspeaking autistic people. He has argued that the assumptions that speech is superior to other forms of communication, or that nonspeaking people do not think, reflect ableist views.

Psychologist Stuart Vyse critiques Jaswal's 2020 eye-tracking study of assisted autistic communication, stating that it was descriptive and did not rule out assistant influence. Vyse noted that the assistant held the letterboard during the sessions and questioned why the letterboard could not instead be placed on a table or easel. Vyse states "In my opinion, the evidence they offer is not compelling. As a result, they have not met the burden of proof incumbent on them."

Kathrine Beals, affiliated with the Autism Program at Drexel University's School of Education, argued that Jaswal's eye-tracking study "is based on faulty assumptions that undermine both its rationale and its conclusions." Beals criticized the study because it did not use a double-blind message-passing test However, Jaswal has argued that messaging-passing tests may underestimate or misrepresent ability when they do not account for the developmental history and testing conditions of nonspeaking autistic people.

Jaswal and his research team used eye-tracking technology during a familiar communication activity to study the visual-motor patterns of nonspeaking autistic participants. The researchers reported that participants looked at most letters before pointing to them, made few spelling errors, and showed timing patterns that the authors interpreted as evidence of agency in assisted autistic communication among the participants studied.

The eye-tracking study also raises an important contrast between prompting for movement initiation and cueing that determines letter selection. Some nonspeaking autistic people may experience problems initiating actions and may need external prompts to begin movement. In that context, a prompt from a letterboard assistant does not necessarily mean that the assistant authored the message. Jaswal and colleagues reported that autistic participants often shifted their eye gaze to the next target letter before pointing to it. This matters because it suggests that the autistic participant's eye gaze was leading the next letter selection while the assistant was tracking and recording letters already touched. Although subtle cues may occur earlier, the eye-tracking findings make simple assistant guidance at the moment of pointing less sufficient as an explanation. This qualification is relevant because claims about earlier cuing assume that autistic participants could detect and use indirect or peripheral cues during rapid letter selection; however, studies have reported differences in peripheral vision in autism, including a narrower functional field of view and reduced sensitivity in the peripheral visual field.

In 2019, Jaswal and Nameera Akhtar of the University of California, Santa Cruz published a research article in Behavioral and Brain Sciences arguing that some autistic behaviors, including low eye contact, infrequent pointing, motor stereotypies, and echolalia, are often misinterpreted as evidence of low social interest. This article was published with open peer commentaries from more than 30 scholars. According to a UC Santa Cruz report, nearly all commenters endorsed Jaswal and Akhtar's approach, while some had concerns it could minimize important differences in autistic cognition and social motivation. Jaswal and Akhtar argued in a related opinion essay that the assumption that autistic people are uninterested in socializing dehumanizes them.

Jaswal's work challenges assumptions that non-speaking autistic people have less intelligence, a lack of social motivation, and cannot think for themselves. His work has highlighted the experiences of non-speaking autistic people, building an insider-based challenge to the negative assumptions about non-speaking autistic people.

His work also provides alternative explanations of autism. In 2013, Jaswal and Akhtar co-edited a special section of the journal Developmental Psychology on the debate over whether autistic children's development should be changed to fit current developmental norms, or embraced as a naturally occurring part of the human condition. The idea that autism does not need to be "corrected" is the foundation of the Neurodiversity movement.

== Representative publications ==
- Jaswal, Vikram K.; Neely, Leslie A. (September 2006). "Adults Don't Always Know Best: Preschoolers Use Past Reliability Over Age When Learning New Words". Psychological Science. 17 (9): 757–758. doi:10.1111/j.1467-9280.2006.01778.x. PMID 16984291. S2CID 41301338.
- Akhtar, Nameera; Jaswal, Vikram K. (2013). "Deficit or difference? Interpreting diverse developmental paths: An introduction to the special section". Developmental Psychology. 49 (1): 1–3. doi:10.1037/a0029851. PMID 23316772.
- Jaswal, Vikram K. (July 2017). "Rethinking Autism's Past, Present, and Future". The American Journal of Psychology. 130 (2): 243–249. doi:10.5406/amerjpsyc.130.2.0243.
- Jaswal, Vikram K.; Akhtar, Nameera (2019). "Being versus appearing socially uninterested: Challenging assumptions about social motivation in autism". Behavioral and Brain Sciences. 42 e82. doi:10.1017/S0140525X18001826. PMID 29914590. S2CID 49305763.
- Jaswal, Vikram K.; Wayne, Allison; Golino, Hudson (12 May 2020). "Eye-tracking reveals agency in assisted autistic communication". Scientific Reports. 10 (1): 7882. Bibcode:2020NatSR..10.7882J. doi:10.1038/s41598-020-64553-9. PMC 7217901. PMID 32398782.
