= Rita Jordan =

Autism researcher

- Education: University of Birmingham
- Scientific career
- Thesis: An empirical and theoretical investigation of pronominal development in individuals with autistic spectrum disorders (1998)

Rita Ruth Jordan is a British academic and researcher in the field of autism. She worked with children with special educational needs and started training programmes for their parents before moving into academia.

== Education and career ==
Jordan has a B.Sc. from University College London, an M.Sc. in child development, and an M.A. in linguistics. She earned her Ph.D. from the University of Birmingham in 1998. She trained teachers at the University of Hertfordshire before moving to the University of Birmingham. She started the Autism Centre for Education and Research at the University of Birmingham along with Glenys Jones. Jordan was the founding editor for Autism along with Patricia Howlin. Jordan retired from the University of Birmingham and is now an emeritus professor.

== Autism work ==
Jordan's work focused on improving the educational support for children on the autism spectrum. She published a review on existing educational interventions for the Department for Education along with her colleagues at Birmingham in 1998. She has authored several books on autism, many of these have been translated into different languages. Her publications cover topics in the field of autism and education, including books such as Autism with Severe Learning Difficulties, Autism and Learning, and Understanding and Teaching Children with Autism. Her journal articles raised issues to consider in the development of provision and practice for individuals on the autism spectrum.

== Awards and honors ==
Jordan's awards include an OBE in 2007. She presented the Gulliford Lecture at the University of Birmingham in 2007. In 2014 she received a lifetime achievement award from the National Autistic Society, and in a 2014 interview, Jordan describes this as a positive moment in her career.
