= Patricia Howlin =

English psychiatrist

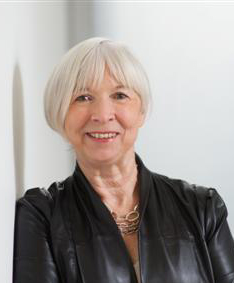
- Patricia Howlin in February 2013
- Occupation: professor

Patricia Howlin is Professor of Clinical Child Psychology at the Institute of Psychiatry, London, whose principal research interests focus on autism and developmental disorders including Williams syndrome, developmental language disorders and Fragile X. Howlin had a specific interest in the adult outcomes for individuals with autism. She published and presented on this subject extensively.

Howlin is a Fellow of the British Psychological Society, who has served as Chair of the UK Association of Child Psychology and Psychiatry and the Society for the Study of Behavioural Phenotypes She, along with Rita Jordan, were founding editors of the journal Autism.

== Selected publications ==
- Howlin, Patricia (2004). Autism and Asperger syndrome : preparing for adulthood. Routledge. ISBN 9780415309684.
- Howlin Patricia; Goode Susan; Hutton Jane; Rutter Michael (2004). "Adult outcome for children with autism". Journal of Child Psychology and Psychiatry. 45 (2): 212–229. doi:10.1111/j.1469-7610.2004.00215.x. PMID 14982237.
- Howlin, Patricia; Baron-Cohen, Simon; Hadwin, Julie (1999). Teaching children with autism to mind-read : a practical guide for teachers and parents. Wiley. ISBN 9780585334424.
- Howlin Patricia; Moore Anna (1997). "Diagnosis in Autism A Survey of Over 1200 Patients in the UK". Autism. 1 (2): 135–162. doi:10.1177/1362361397012003. S2CID 145414617.
