= Sue Fletcher-Watson =

British developmental psychologist

Sue Fletcher-Watson FRSE CPsychol
- Other name: Susan

Academic background
- Education: Durham University (PhD, MA); University of St Andrews (BSc)
- Thesis: Understanding social attention in adults with and without autism spectrum disorders (2008)
- Doctoral advisor: Susan Leekam

Academic work
- Discipline: Psychologist
- Sub-discipline: Neurodivergence
- Institutions: University of Edinburgh; Newcastle University

Sue Fletcher-Watson is a British developmental psychologist, academic, and author. She is currently the personal chair of development psychology at the University of Edinburgh, and she was awarded a Fellowship of the Royal Society of Edinburgh in 2026.

== Early life and education ==
Fletcher-Watson studied psychology at the University of St Andrews. In 2003, she graduated with a Bachelor of Science.

Later, Fletcher-Watson attended Durham University. In 2004, she obtained a Master of Arts in developmental psychopathology. Under the supervision of Susan Leekam, Fletcher-Watson was conferred Doctor of Philosophy in 2008, for her research in spontaneous social attention of autistic and non-autistic adults.

== Career ==
Upon graduation, Fletcher-Watson was a postdoctoral research fellow at Newcastle University.

In 2010, Fletcher-Watson was awarded a Nuffield Foundation New Career Development Fellowship at the University of Edinburgh, which funded a study on a technology-based early intervention for social communication skills in preschoolers. In 2014, she was appointed as a Chancellor's Fellow, and in 2019, she was appointed as director of the Salvesen Mindroom Research Centre, and personal chair of developmental psychology.

In 2022, Fletcher-Watson was appointed editor-in-chief for Autism. In 2024, she stepped down as director of the Salvesen Mindroom Research Centre, and became dean of equity, inclusion and community of the College of Medicine and Veterinary Medicine. In 2026, Fletcher-Watson was elected a Fellow of the Royal Society of Edinburgh, in the discipline of biomedical and cognitive sciences.

== Research ==
Fletcher-Watson's research is on the development of children, with a focus on neurodivergence. As part of the Nuffield Foundation-funded study, she led an application development to develop social skills for children with severe autism. In January 2012, she told BBC News that touchscreen technology was crucial in early intervention, as mice and keyboards were usually not available for young children.

In September 2017, in a study looking into fictional portrayals of autistic people, such as Sheldon Cooper, she said that more autistic characters need to shown on to "deepen public understanding of autism spectrum disorders", and the characters should "reflect the diversity we see in real life".

To date, Fletcher-Watson has authored or co-authored over 100 publications.

== Personal life ==
Fletcher-Watson is pansexual and cisgender. She is married, and has two children.

== Selected publications ==
=== Books ===
- Fletcher-Watson, Sue; Happé, Francesca (25 February 2019). Autism: A New Introduction to Psychological Theory and Current Debate (2nd ed.). London: Routledge. doi:10.4324/9781315101699. ISBN 9781138106123. LCCN 2018053243. OCLC 1073035060.
- Davis, Rachael; O'Neill, Claire; Fletcher-Watson, Sue, eds. (22 December 2025). It Takes All Kinds of Minds: Fostering Neurodivergent Thriving at School. Speechmark (1st ed.). London: Routledge. doi:10.4324/9781003493044. ISBN 9781040634066. LCCN 2025036885. OCLC 1552151576.
- Chapman, Robert; Fletcher-Watson, Sue (12 January 2026). Neurodiversity: A Very Short Introduction. New York: Oxford University Press. doi:10.1093/9780191987915.001.0001. ISBN 9780198876519. LCCN 2025938821. OCLC 1566294845.

=== Journal articles ===
- Fletcher-Watson, Sue; Findlay, John M; Leekam, Susan R; Benson, Valerie (1 January 2008). "Rapid Detection of Person Information in a Naturalistic Scene". Perception. 37 (4). SAGE Publishing: 571–583. doi:10.1068/p5705. eISSN 1468-4233. ISSN 0301-0066.
- Fletcher-Watson, S.; Leekam, S. R.; Benson, V.; Frank, M. C.; Findlay, J. M. (29 July 2008). "Eye-movements reveal attention to social information in autism spectrum disorder". Neuropsychologia. 47 (1). Pergamon Press: 248–257. doi:10.1016/j.neuropsychologia.2008.07.016. eISSN 1873-3514. ISSN 0028-3932. OCLC 01759703. CODEN NUPSA6.
- Fletcher-Watson, Sue; McConnell, Fiona; Manola, Eirini; McConachie, Helen (21 March 2014). Cochrane Developmental, Psychosocial and Learning Problems Group (ed.). "Interventions based on the Theory of Mind cognitive model for autism spectrum disorder (ASD)". Cochrane Database of Systematic Reviews. 2020 (2). doi:10.1002/14651858.CD008785.pub2. PMC 6923148. PMID 24652601.
- Fletcher-Watson, Sue; Adams, Jon; Brook, Kabie; Charman, Tony; Crane, Laura; Cusack, James; Leekam, Susan; Milton, Damian; Parr, Jeremy R; Pellicano, Elizabeth (10 August 2018). "Making the future together: Shaping autism research through meaningful participation". Autism. 23 (4). SAGE Publications: 943–953. doi:10.1177/1362361318786721. eISSN 1461-7005. ISSN 1362-3613. LCCN 97641074. OCLC 41550873. PMC 6512245. PMID 30095277.
- Crompton, Catherine J; Ropar, Danielle; Evans-Williams, Claire VM; Flynn, Emma G; Fletcher-Watson, Sue (20 May 2020). "Autistic peer-to-peer information transfer is highly effective". Autism. 24 (7). SAGE Publications: 1704–1712. doi:10.1177/1362361320919286. eISSN 1461-7005. ISSN 1362-3613. LCCN 97641074. OCLC 41550873. PMC 7545656. PMID 32431157.}
