= Neuroinclusive design =

Neurodiversity-friendly design approach

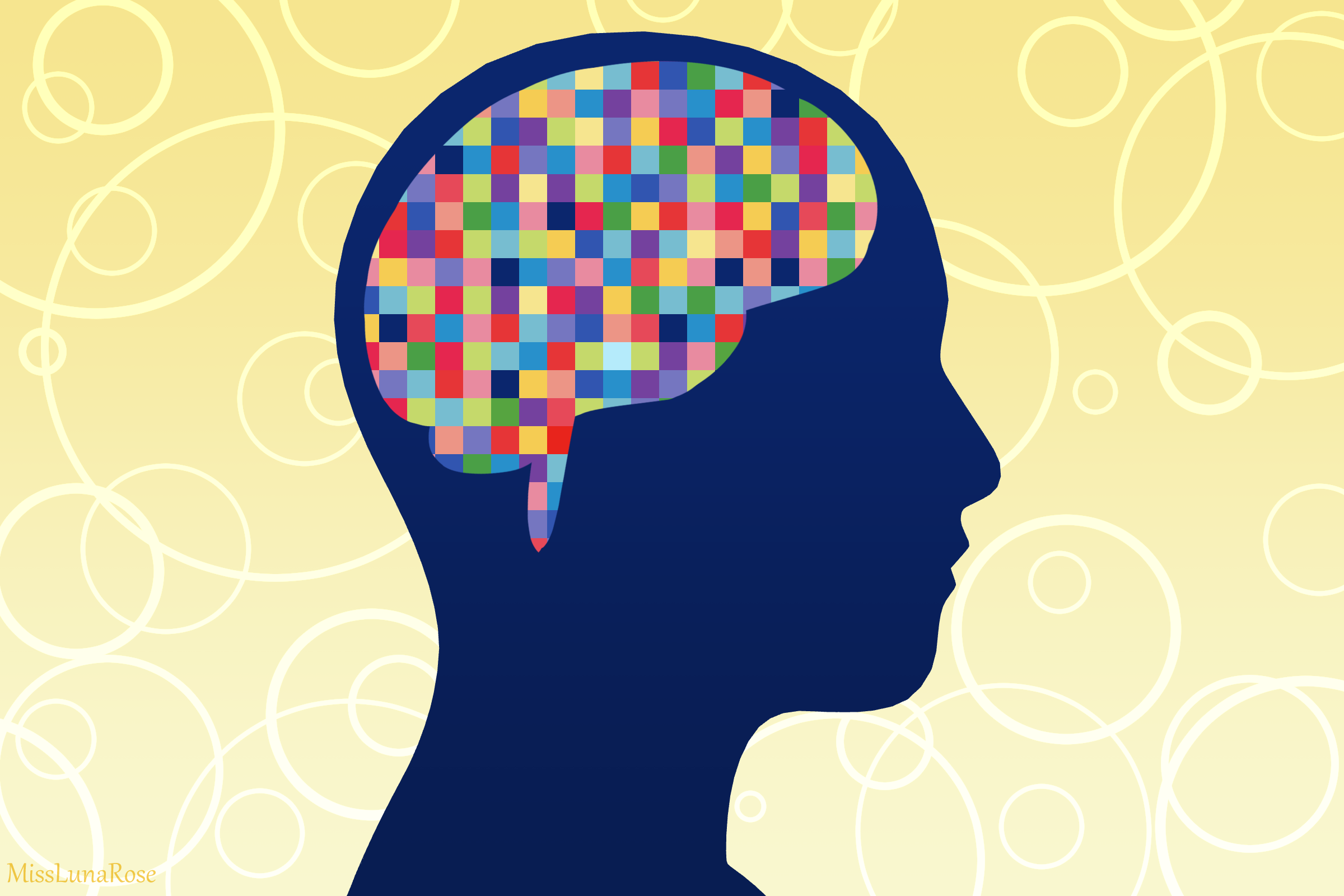
Each individual harbors their own perspectives and values, which stem from having unique functionalities in their brain. Members of neurodivergent communities, in particular, have high potential to strengthen society if properly accommodated.

Neuroinclusive design, or neuro-inclusive design, references a human-centered approach of designing products, services, or environments in a manner that enables individuals of all sensory profiles to coexist within the same space. Neuroinclusive design creates spaces and experiences that are accessible and user-friendly for everyone, covering the entire neurodiversity spectrum.

== Spectrum nature of neurodevelopmental disabilities ==
Neurodevelopmental disabilities exist on spectrums, leading to variations in behavioral patterns between individuals with the same disability. Therefore, different individuals often harbor unique environmental preferences, specifically concerning volume, color, spatial availability, simplicity, and pressure from societal interactions. Over recent years, an increasing attentiveness towards neuroinclusivity has encouraged companies and academic institutions to modify products and workspaces to accommodate the neurodivergent community.

== Design models used in education ==
According to the United Nations Department of Economic and Social Affairs, a key goal for sustainability includes offering equal educational opportunities for all humans. This sustainability issue connects neuroinclusive design directly to improving academic support systems to provide proper accommodations for neurodivergent individuals across spectrums.

Many institutions use foundational academic neuroinclusive design structures to guide students' education. One of the more commonly known models includes the strength-based model or strength-based practice. The strength-based model focuses on an individual's capabilities rather than their weaknesses, allowing individuals to control their improvement in specific areas. Higher education facilities often merge a strength-based model with specializations, customizing accommodations based on the students' academic interests. On one hand, researchers explain that the strength-based model retains limitations, especially when supporting neurodivergent students. The strength-based model's emphasis on specialization may contribute to the misconception that all neurodivergent individuals display exceptional capabilities within specific fields (e.g., foreign language inquisition or mathematical analysis). These notions can decrease the strength-based model's effectiveness while also potentially making educational accommodations more burdensome for neurodivergent students.

Some institutions also focus on improving physical learning environments to promote equal educational opportunities for the neurodivergent community. An approach that advances these goals includes the Autism SPACE Framework, a system that outlines specific conditions that designers must consider prior to workspace or product development. Within the Autism SPACE Framework, the acronym "SPACE" refers to sensory needs, predictability, acceptance, communication, and empathy as five essential principles in an area that provides strong support for autistic individuals. Additionally, the core values represented through the Autism SPACE Framework encourage further advancements in neuroinclusive design outside the classroom setting, including office workspaces or communal social spaces, to support neurodivergent individuals beyond those who are autistic.

== Technology ==
Following the increasing use of interactive technology, more facilities (e.g. businesses, workspaces, and educational institutions) have prioritized adjusting design features to accommodate individuals across the neurological spectrum. Some companies focus on improving human-computer interactions (HCI), a specific interdisciplinary design technique that personalizes digital interfaces to meet the user's preferences. Other techniques used to improve neuroinclusive design on a digital scale include crip technoscience, neuroqueer technoscience, digital ethnography, and participatory design (PD).

Research-backed models aiming to improve neuroinclusive design in educational settings share overlapping principles with design recommendations for creating accommodating user interfaces (UI). For example, designers recommend flexible customization features that allow users to adjust text sizes, color themes, and fonts according to their respective environmental needs. Designers also emphasize the importance of applying components that promote easy navigation, including pages with structured layouts that retain consistent feedback mechanisms. These features in particular correlate with the core principles from the SPACE framework relating to sensory needs and predictability, demonstrating how design models apply to multiple fields.

Some concerns that surround HCI research in particular include the neurodivergent community's limited involvement in the design process. These limitations may contribute to framing neurodivergent behaviors as atypical rather than natural variations in human behavior. Therefore, the resulting technological designs may not fully embrace the emotional and practical needs of neurodivergent users.

== See also ==
- Universal design
