= Neurodiversity In Tech =

Online community

- Abbreviation: ND In Tech, NDIT
- Formation: 2023
- Founder: Hayley Witherell
- Type: Online community
- Purpose: Network for neurodivergent technology professionals
- Members: 700 (2026)
- Website: nd-in-tech.org

Neurodiversity In Tech (ND In Tech or NDIT) is an online community for neurodivergent professionals in the technology industry. Founded in 2023, the group aims to foster connections and advocate for inclusion. It primarily operates through Slack. Members use the community for professional networking, career discussions, and peer support.

== Activities ==
Social activities have included monthly online happy hours and coffee chats. Members use its discussion channels to exchange career advice and resources, share memes, and connect with one another. Discussions at events have covered neurodivergent experiences, job resources, and continuing education.

The ND Tech Talks series includes talks on career paths in technology, autistic perspectives on leadership, and the value of neurodiversity in technology. Its website also provides a public community events calendar.

== Career and workplace resources ==
The community has produced advice for employers on inclusive hiring and workplace practices, including personalized job interview feedback, advance interview topics, meeting transcripts, and written instructions. Its website also links to external peer communities and job-search services, and employers can submit job opportunities through a form on the site.

Career-related activity includes discussions of job resources and the sharing of job postings. Members have also supported one another during job searches, connected on LinkedIn, and shared talent spotlights.

== See also ==
- Neurodiversity and labor rights
- Virtual community
