= M. Remi Yergeau =

American academic (born 1984)

- Born: 1984 (age 41–42)
- Occupation: Assistant professor

Academic background
- Education: Geneva College (BA, 2005); DePaul University (MA, 2007); Ohio State University (PhD, 2011)
- Thesis: Disabling Composition: Toward a 21st-Century, Synaesthetic Theory of Writing (2011)
- Doctoral advisor: Brenda Brueggemann; Cynthia Selfe
- Other advisor: H. Lewis Ulman

Academic work
- Discipline: Rhetoric and Composition
- Sub-discipline: Disability Studies
- Notable works: Authoring Autism

M. Remi Yergeau (formerly Melanie Yergeau, born 1984) is an American academic in the fields of rhetoric and writing studies, digital studies, queer rhetoric, disability studies, and theories of mind. As of 2025, Yergeau is an associate professor in Communication and Media Studies and Canada Research Chair in Critical Disability Studies and Communication at Carleton University.

Yergeau received a Bachelor of Arts in writing from Geneva College in 2005, a Master of Arts in writing from DePaul University in 2007, and a Doctorate of Philosophy in English from the Ohio State University in 2011. After receiving their Ph.D., Yergeau became an assistant professor with the Department of English at the University of Michigan. They were promoted to associate professor in 2017.

Yergeau published their first book, Authoring Autism, in 2018. The book won the 2017 Modern Language Association First Book Prize, the 2019 CCCC Lavender Rhetorics Book Award, and the 2019 Rhetoric Society of America Book Award. Further, the book has been reviewed in several academic and public venues, including American Literature, Disability & Society, Feminist Formations, GLQ, the Journal of Literary and Cultural Disability Studies, the Los Angeles Review of Books, philoSOPHIA, Rhetoric Society Quarterly, and Public Books.

Yergeau is autistic and uses they/them pronouns.

== Accolades ==
Awards for Yergeau's scholarship
Year	Text	Award	Result	Ref.
2009	"Expanding the Space of f2f"	Kairos Best Webtext Award	Winner	
2010	"aut(hored)ism"	Kairos Best Webtext Award	Honorable mention	
2015	"Clinically Significant Disturbance"	Kathleen Ethel Welch Outstanding Article Award	Honorable mention	
2017	Authoring Autism	Modern Language Association First Book Prize	Winner	
2019	Authoring Autism	CCCC Lavender Rhetorics Book Award for Excellence in Queer Scholarship	Winner	
2019	Authoring Autism	Rhetoric Society of America Book Award	Winner	

== Publications ==
=== Articles ===
- Yergeau, M. Remi; Wozniak, Kathryn (August 15, 2008). "Expanding the Space of f2f: Writing Centers and Audio-Visual-Textual Conferencing". Kairos: A Journal of Rhetoric, Technology, and Pedagogy. 13 (1).
- Yergeau, M. Remi (Spring 2009). "aut(hored)ism". Computers and Composition Online.
- Yergeau, M. Remi (2010). "Circle Wars: Reshaping the Typical Autism Essay". Disability Studies Quarterly. 30 (1). doi:10.18061/dsq.v30i1.1063. ISSN 2159-8371.
- Heilker, Paul; Yergeau, M. Remi (May 2011). "Autism and Rhetoric". College English. 73 (5): 485–497. doi:10.58680/ce201114900. hdl:10919/25792. ISSN 0010-0994.
- Yergeau, M. Remi; Brewer, Elizabeth; Kerschbaum, Stephanie L.; Oswal, Sushil; Price, Margaret; Salvo, Michael J.; Selfe, Cynthia L.; Howes, Franny (August 15, 2013). "Multimodality in Motion: Disability and Kairotic Spaces". Kairos: A Journal of Rhetoric, Technology, and Pedagogy. 18 (1).
- Yergeau, M. Remi (September 5, 2013). "Clinically Significant Disturbance: On Theorists Who Theorize Theory of Mind". Disability Studies Quarterly. 33 (4). doi:10.18061/dsq.v33i4.3876. ISSN 2159-8371.
- Yergeu, M. Remi (Spring 2014). "Disability Hacktivism". In Sayers; Hocks (eds.). Hacking the Classroom: Eight Perspectives. Computers and Composition Online.
- Yergeau, M. Remi; Selfe; Brewer (Fall 2014). "Creating a Culture of Access in Composition Studies". Composition Studies. 42 (2).
- Boyle, Casey; Vie, Stephanie; Micciche, Laura; Yergeau, M. Remi; Dadas, Caroline; Morris, Janine; Smith, Christian; Blankenship, Lisa (June 1, 2015). "e.pluribus plures: DMAC and its Keywords". Computers and Composition. CIWIC, DMAC, and Technology Professional Development in Rhetoric and Composition. 36: 1–15. doi:10.1016/j.compcom.2015.04.004. ISSN 8755-4615.
- Eyman, Douglas; Ball, Cheryl E.; Boggs, Jeremy; Booher, Amanda K.; Burnside, Elkie; DeWitt, Scott Lloyd; Dockter, Jason; Dolmage, Jay; Gardner, Traci (January 1, 2016). "Access/ibility: Access and Usability for Digital Publishing". Kairos: A Journal of Rhetoric, Technology, and Pedagogy. 20 (2).
- Yergeau, M. Remi; Huebner, Bryce (September 2017). "Minding Theory of Mind". Journal of Social Philosophy. 48 (3): 273–296. doi:10.1111/josp.12191. ISSN 0047-2786.
- Gernsbacher; Yergeau, M. Remi (2019). "Empirical Failures of the Claim that Autistic People Lack a Theory of Mind". Archives of Scientific Psychology. 7 (1): 102–118. doi:10.1037/arc0000067. PMC 6959478. PMID 31938672.
- Ho, Ai Binh T.; Kerschbaum, Stephanie L.; Sanchez, Rebecca; Yergeau, M. Remi (2020). "Cripping Neutrality: Student Resistance, Pedagogical Audiences, and Teachers' Accommodations". Pedagogy. 20 (1): 127–139. doi:10.1215/15314200-7879120. ISSN 1533-6255.
- Yergeau, M. Remi (May 26, 2020). "Cassandra Isn't Doing the Robot: On Risky Rhetorics and Contagious Autism". Rhetoric Society Quarterly. 50 (3): 212–221. doi:10.1080/02773945.2020.1752132. ISSN 0277-3945.

=== Books ===
- Ashkenazy, Elesia; Yergeau, M. Remi, eds. (February 20, 2013). "Handbook: Relationships and Sexuality" (PDF). The Arc Autism Now.
- Yergeau, M. Remi (2018). Authoring autism: on rhetoric and neurological queerness. Thought in the act. Durham London: Duke University Press. ISBN 978-0-8223-7218-9. JSTOR j.ctv1168bxt.

=== Book chapters ===
- Blackburn; Yergeau, Melanie (2017). "Mine, Yours, and Ours: Developing Collaborative Relationships in the Academic Sphere". In Davis, Andrea; Webb, Suzanne (eds.). Metamorphosis: The Effects of Professional Development on Graduate Students. Fountainhead Press.
- Yergeau, M. Remi. "Design". In Heilker, Paul; Vandenberg, Peter (eds.). Keywords in Writing Studies. University Press of Colorado.
- Yergeau, M. Remi. "Production". In Heilker, Paul; Vandenberg, Peter (eds.). Keywords in Writing Studies. University Press of Colorado.
- Yergeau, M. Remi (2016). "Occupying Autism: Rhetoric, Involuntarity, and the Meaning of Autistic Lives". In Block, Pamela; Kasnitz, Devva; Nishida, Akemi; Pollard, Nick (eds.). Occupying Disability: Critical Approaches to Community, Justice, and Decolonizing Disability. SpringerLink.
- Yergeau, M. Remi (2018). "Wandering Rhetoric, Rhetoric Wandering". In Wysocki, Rick; Sheridan, Mary P. (eds.). Making Future Matters. Computers and Composition Digital Press. ISBN 978-1-60732-899-5.

== See also ==
- Hanna Bertilsdotter Rosqvist
- Neuroqueer theory
- Nick Walker (scholar)
