= Hanna Bertilsdotter Rosqvist =

Swedish academic

Academic background
- Education: Umeå University (PhD, 2007)

Academic work
- Discipline: Social work, sociology, neurodiversity studies
- Institutions: Lund University; Umeå University; Karlstad University; Södertörn University

Hanna Bertilsdotter Rosqvist is a Swedish academic in sociology and social work. Although her initial research focused on sex and gender, she has shifted her focus toward neurodiversity studies. Bertilsdotter Rosqvist has held positions at Lund University, Karlstad University, Umeå University, and Södertörn University. She co-edited Different Childhoods (2018), Neurodiversity Studies (2020), The Palgrave Handbook of Research Methods and Ethics in Neurodiversity Studies (2024), and Exploring Autistic Sexualities, Relationality, and Genders (2025). She was previously the chief editor of the Scandinavian Journal of Disability Research.

== Biography ==
Bertilsdotter Rosqvist received a Doctor of Philosophy in sociology from Umeå University in 2007. Her dissertation focused on male bisexuality.

Bertilsdotter Rosqvist has held positions at Lund University, Karlstad University, Umeå University, and Södertörn University, while being housed in gender studies, sociology, and social work. Her research initially explored gender normativity, though in 2008, she began focusing on disability, with primary interest in autism and critical autism studies, later moving toward neurodiversity studies. Around this time, she recognized herself as autistic.

Bertilsdotter Rosqvist was previously the chief editor of the Scandinavian Journal of Disability Research.

In addition to other scholarly works, Bertilsdotter Rosqvist has co-edited four collections, primarily related to neurodiversity. In 2018, Lindsay O'Dell, Charlotte Brownlow, and Bertilsdotter Rosqvist co-edited Different Childhoods: Non/Normative Development and Transgressive Trajectories. The book, which asserts that "children's' development is partial, contextual, and relational", explores topics related to childhood development, including autism, gender, masculinity, domestic violence, immigration, and more. Along with Nick Chown and Anna Stenning, Bertilsdotter Rosqvist co-edited Neurodiversity Studies, published with Routledge in 2020. The collection proposed neurodiversity studies as a new field of critical theory, expanding from the related field of critical autism studies to account for a broader range of experiences related to neurodivergence. The following year, Bertilsdotter Rosqvist co-edited Aktionsforskning – möjligheter, utmaningar och variationer (Action research – opportunities, challenges and variations) with Magdalena Elmersjö and Lisa Kings. The book explores topics related to action research. In 2024, Bertilsdotter Rosqvist and David Jackson-Perry co-edited The Palgrave Handbook of Research Methods and Ethics in Neurodiversity Studies. The following year, Routledge published Exploring Autistic Sexualities, Relationality, and Gender, which Bertilsdotter Rosqvist co-edited with Anna Day and Meaghan Krazinski.

== Books ==
- O'Dell, Lindsay; Brownlow, Charlotte; Bertilsdotter-Rosqvist, Hanna, eds. (2018). Different Childhoods: Non/Normative Development and Transgressive Trajectories. Routledge. ISBN 978-1-138-65404-4.
- Bertilsdotter Rosqvist, Hanna; Chown, Nick; Stenning, Anna, eds. (2020). Neurodiversity Studies: A New Critical Paradigm. Routledge. ISBN 978-0-367-33831-2.
- Bertilsdotter-Rosqvist, Hanna; Elmersjö, Magdalena; Kings, Lisa, eds. (2021). Aktionsforskning – möjligheter, utmaningar och variationer. Lund.
- Bertilsdotter Rosqvist, Hanna; Jackson-Perry, David, eds. (2024). The Palgrave Handbook of Research Methods and Ethics in Neurodiversity Studies. Palgrave Macmillan. doi:10.1007/978-3-031-66127-3. ISBN 978-3-031-66126-6.
- Bertilsdotter Rosqvist, Hanna; Day, Anna; Krazinski, Meaghan, eds. (2025). Exploring Autistic Sexualities, Relationality, and Genders: Living Under a Double Rainbow. Routledge. ISBN 978-1-032-57611-4.
