= Social Responsiveness Scale =

- Purpose: Measure autistic traits

The Social Responsiveness Scale, developed by John Constantino in 2002 and expanded upon by Constantino et al. in 2003, is a quantitative measure of autistic traits in 4–18 year olds. Its correlation with behaviour problems and autism spectrum disorder symptoms has been studied. It can be assessed with an 18 question survey filled out by the child's parents or teacher.

In 2012, the Social Responsiveness Scale, Second Edition (SRS-2), an updated 65-item version of the test, was published. The test uses separate forms for preschool, school-age, and adult populations.

The list of questions is subject to copyright.

== See also ==
- Child Behavior Checklist
