= Damian Milton =

British autism researcher and advocate

- Born: August 1973 (age 53)
- Citizenship: British
- Education: University of Reading (BA); University of London (MA); London South Bank University (MA); University of Birmingham (PhD)
- Known for: Autism research, double empathy problem
- Scientific career
- Fields: Psychology; sociology
- Workplaces: University of Kent
- Thesis: Educational Discourse and the Autistic Student: A Study Using Q-sort Methodology (2015)

Damian Elgin Maclean Milton (born August 1973) is a British sociologist and social psychologist who specialises in autism research and is an autism rights advocate. He is a lecturer at the University of Kent as well as a consultant for the United Kingdom's National Autistic Society and has academic qualifications in sociology, psychology, philosophy, and education.

Milton's interest in autism began when his son was diagnosed as autistic in 2005 at two years old. Milton himself was diagnosed with Asperger syndrome in 2009 at the age of 36.

Milton is best known for his "double empathy problem" theory first published in 2012, which is the idea that, contrary to what previous studies in the late 20th century had concluded, autistic people are not inherently deficient in empathy but rather that autistic and non-autistic people bidirectionally struggle with empathy and communicating with one another. While the concept had existed in earlier discourse, dating back to arguments voiced by activists like Jim Sinclair since the 1990s, Milton named and significantly expanded on it.

Milton has co-authored over 250 publications related to autism. His work is influenced by the social model of disability, and many of his publications deconstruct and critically analyse past theories. For example, he has argued that self-stimulatory behavior (stimming) should be viewed positively and may help autistic people achieve flow states. His work has been favourably received by the academic as well as the autistic community.

He has spoken out against the Spectrum 10K project, questioning whether it truly was contributing to the well-being of autistic people.

== Selected works ==
=== Journal articles ===
- 2012: On the ontological status of autism: the 'double empathy problem'
- 2012: The normalisation agenda and the psycho-emotional disablement of autistic people
- 2013: Autistics speak but are they heard?
- 2014: Autistic expertise: A critical reflection on the production of knowledge in autism studies
- 2016: How is a sense of well-being and belonging constructed in the accounts of autistic adults?
- 2018: Making the future together: Shaping autism research through meaningful participation
- 2018: Redefining Critical Autism Studies: a more inclusive interpretation

=== Books ===
- Milton, Damian; Ridout, Susy; Martin, Nicola; Mills, Richard; Murray, Dinah (2020). The Neurodiversity Reader: Exploring Concepts, Lived Experience and Implications for Practice. Shoreham by Sea, West Sussex: Pavilion Publishing and Media Limited. ISBN 978-1912755394. OCLC 1294123540.
- Milton, Damian (2017). A Mismatch of Salience: Explorations from the Nature of Autism from Theory to Practice. Hove, East Sussex. ISBN 978-1-911028-76-5. OCLC 1019482019.
