= Matilda Rosqvist =

Swedish footballer

Personal information
- Date of birth: 16 October 1989 (age 37)
- Place of birth: Stockholm, Sweden
- Height: 1.75 m (5 ft 9 in)
- Position: Midfielder

Team information
- Current team: AIK

Youth career
- IFK Österåker

Senior career*
Years	Team	Apps	(Gls)
2009–2012	Djurgården	68	(5)
2013–2014	Sunnanå	47	(7)
2015	Djurgården	21	(3)
2016–	AIK	114	(19)
- * Club domestic league appearances and goals as of 20 August 2019 (UTC)

Matilda Rosqvist (born 16 October 1989) is a Swedish football midfielder who currently plays for AIK. She has played Damallsvenskan football for Sunnanå SK and Djurgårdens IF. She currently plays for AIK Fotboll in the Swedish Elitettan.

== Career ==
Rosqvist started her youth career in IFK Österåker.
