= Critical autism studies =

Interdisciplinary research field led by autistic people

Critical autism studies (CAS) is an interdisciplinary research field within autism studies led by autistic people. This field is related to both disability studies and neurodiversity studies.

CAS as a discipline is led by autistic academics, and many autistic people engage with the discipline in nonacademic spaces. The point of this field's existence is to give power to the voices of autistic people in autism research, but there is critique of the field for failing to represent the depth of how intersectionality affects autistic people. The field of critical autism studies was created for the purpose of creating a better life for autistic individuals through the challenging of the medical model of disability, discrimination against autistic people, and harmful stereotypes about autism. Many CAS scholars are from fields in the social sciences and humanities.

The primary components of this field of research are how autism as a label is impacted by power relations between autistic and non-autistic scholars, challenges against the medical model of disability and deficit narratives in relation to autism, and how autism as an identity is highly individualized. Two other components that have been proposed but have not been widely accepted within CAS are whether autism diagnoses are valid given the way that autism as a label has been created by non-autistic people and what the value of an autism diagnosis is.

== History ==
- Key themes of CAS as a field can be traced back to Jim Sinclair in 1993.
- CAS as we know it now originates from a workshop by Joyce Davidson and Michael Orsini in 2011.
- Larry Arnold released the first journal for CAS in 2012.
- The first book on the theoretical work of CAS was published in 2016.

== Theoretical works ==
- Autonomy: The Critical Journal of Interdisciplinary Autism Studies emerged as the first CAS journal in 2012 and ran until 2019.
- Ought: The Journal of Autistic Culture emerged as a CAS journal in 2019 and is still running. One of the editors of this journal, Robert Rozema, says that the journal is a space for dialogue about the field and that CAS as a field should include creative works from autistic individuals.
- Books on the theoretical work of CAS include War on Autism: On the Cultural Logic of Normative Violence (2016) by Anne McGuire, Authoring Autism: On Rhetoric and Neurological Queerness (2018) by M. Remi Yergeau, and All the Weight of Our Dreams: On Living Racialized Autism (2017) by Morénike Giwa Onaiwu.
