= Judy Singer =

Australian sociologist

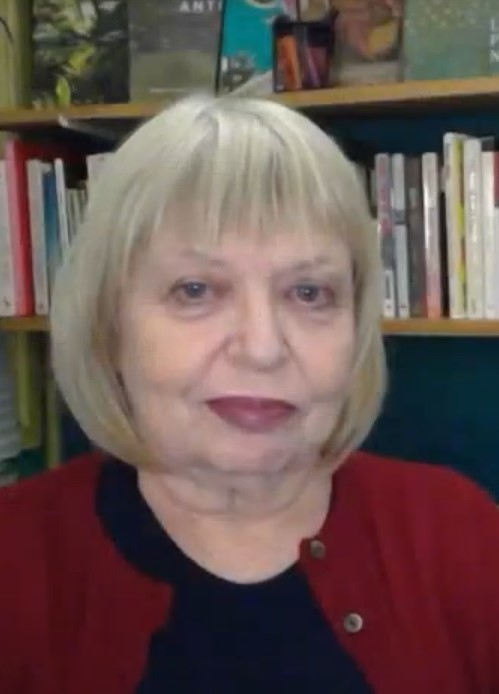

Education
- Education: University of Technology Sydney

Philosophical work
- School: Disability studies
- Notable ideas: Neurodiversity

Judy Singer is an Australian sociologist who popularized the term "neurodiversity". After working as a computer consultant, Singer studied sociology at the University of Technology Sydney, where she was influenced by disability studies and Lorna Wing's conception of autism as a spectrum.

Singer's 1999 thesis, Odd People In: The Birth of Community Amongst People on the Autism Spectrum, proposed understanding neurological differences as analogous to biodiversity, as more neutral and less pathologizing than traditional understandings of disabilities. Based on her thesis, she contributed a chapter to Disability Discourse. She later founded the Australian support group ASpar and published Neurodiversity: The Birth of an Idea (2016).

== Biography ==
Judy Singer, born in Hungary to a Jewish mother who survived World War II, grew up in Australia. For years, she worked in computing and later became a single mother. Singer noticed traits in her daughter that resembled the social difficulties of her mother. Later, Singer's daughter was diagnosed with Asperger syndrome. Singer has also described herself as "likely somewhere on the autistic spectrum". After reaching out to the Autism Association of Australia, she became influenced by British psychologist Lorna Wing's work treating autism as a spectrum.

Before the diagnosis, Singer began studying sociology at the University of Technology Sydney and delved into British and American disability studies. At university, Singer made connections on online mailing lists, such as Independent Living on the Autism Spectrum, where she met journalist Harvey Blume who would spread her ideas in the New York Times. Singer's 1999 thesis, Odd People In: The Birth of Community Amongst People on the Autism Spectrum argued for a model of cognitive disorders analogous to biodiversity, as more neutral and less pathologizing than traditional understandings of disabilities. Based on this work, she contributed a chapter to Disability Discourse covering society and human rights.

Following the accreditation of the origin of the term "neurodiversity" to Singer by Steve Silberman in his book NeuroTribes, Singer is often credited with coining the term neurodiversity to represent both the idea of neurological diversity and to think about the existence of a social movement of neurological minorities that would also include the autism rights movement. Later scholarship has treated the concept as a collective development. Singer has distanced herself from the expansion of the term beyond her original focus on "high functioning" autism awareness.

In Australia, Singer also created ASpar, a group to support families of autistic people. In 2016, she published the book Neurodiversity: The Birth of an Idea. Since 2005, Singer has worked in public housing advocacy, was appointed to Social Housing Tenants Advisory Committee as a delegate for Sydney for two terms, and was elected director of the housing non-profit Shelter NSW for 3 terms.

== Publications ==
- Neurodiversity: The birth of an Idea (2016)
