= Spectrum 10K =

UK autism genetic cohort study launched in 2021

Spectrum 10K was a cancelled study of autistic people intended to be the largest of its kind in the United Kingdom. The name refers to the autism spectrum and the putative number of subjects. Led by Simon Baron-Cohen under the aegis of the Autism Research Centre (ARC), the study (an outgrowth of the defunct Human Genome Project) included researchers at the University of Cambridge, the Wellcome Sanger Institute, and the University of California at Los Angeles (UCLA). Participants (including adults and minors with parental consent) were asked to contribute their DNA samples via swabs of saliva, as well as information on their overall mental and physical health. Overall, 10,000 autistic people and their families were to be involved in the study, which aimed to study genetic and environmental factors contributing to autism and co-occurring conditions.

== Reaction ==
The project, which was anticipated to run for a decade, was controversial from the outset, in part, because the study was led by Baron-Cohen, who is criticised by many autism rights activists due to a proposed "extreme male brain" theory of autism and the idea that autistic people have a reduced "theory of mind". Additionally, many in the autism rights movement have criticised the lack of consultation with autistic people or their families, and raised privacy, scientific ethics and eugenics concerns due to fears of sharing genetic data. This led to the formation of the autistic-led Boycott Spectrum 10K group and hashtag, as well as a Change.org petition against the project. As a result of the backlash, the project was paused on 27 September 2021. However, autistic self-advocacy groups have continued to picket centres involved in the project.

As a result of the protest, a second ethics review was conducted. The second ethics review found that the first ethics review was correctly decided and that the study should continue. In January 2025 the project was cancelled, citing among other reasons the availability of genetic samples now available from other databases since the study was paused. The centre now stated an intention to research "ways to promote good health and prevent and treat ill health in autistic people."
