= John Constantino =

American child psychiatrist

- Occupation: Child psychiatrist
- Awards: George Tarjan Award, American Academy of Child and Adolescent Psychiatry, 2015

Academic background
- Education: Cornell University; Washington University in St. Louis

Academic work
- Institutions: Washington University in St. Louis; Children's Healthcare of Atlanta; Emory University

John N. Constantino is a child psychiatrist and expert on neurodevelopmental disorders, especially autism spectrum disorders (ASD). Constantino is the inaugural System Chief of Behavioral and Mental Health at Children's Healthcare of Atlanta. He is a Professor of Pediatrics, Psychiatry and Behavioral Sciences and Genetics at the Emory University School of Medicine.

Constantino is best known for developing the Social Responsiveness Scale (SRS), a diagnostic rating scale used to distinguish autism spectrum disorder from other child psychiatric conditions by identifying the presence and extent of social impairments. The SRS, published in 2005, includes parent-, teacher-, self-, and spouse-report rating forms. It has been used to assess social-behavioral characteristics indicative of the broader autism phenotype. The SRS is a widely used tool to help clinicians identify social impairments in individuals both with and without a diagnosis of ASD.

Constantino received the 2014 Irving Philips Award and the 2015 George Tarjan Award from the American Academy of Child and Adolescent Psychiatry, respectively for lifetime contributions in prevention and developmental disabilities. In 2013, he received the Alumni Achievement Award from the Washington University School of Medicine.

== Biography ==
Constantino earned his B.A. at Cornell University in 1984. Constantino completed his medical degree at Washington University School of Medicine in 1988. After completing a 5-year combined residency in pediatrics, general psychiatry and child psychiatry at the Albert Einstein School of Medicine, Constantino joined the faculty of Washington University School of Medicine where he held the appointment of the Blanche F. Ittelson Chair and Chief of the Division of Child and Adolescent Psychiatry from 2009 to 2022 and co-led its Intellectual and Developmental Disabilities Research Center (IDDRC). His research program at the IDDRC was funded through numerous grants from the National Institutes of Health.

Constantino was appointed the Liz and Frank Blake Chair of Behavioral and Mental Health at Children's Healthcare of Atlanta in 2024, following his move to Atlanta in 2022 to lead a large-scale effort to model system transformation and parity in child mental health there and the vice chair and professor in the department of pediatrics at Emory University School of Medicine.

== Research ==
Constantino's research program focuses on developmental disabilities and social development from infancy through early adulthood. Some of his most influential work has used twin studies to examine the prevalence of autistic traits in the general population (also referred to as the broader autism phenotype) and in at-risk groups including individuals with attention deficit hyperactivity disorder who have heightened rates of autistic traits.

As a member of the Autism Genome Project Consortium, Constantino was involved in genetic linkage studies of autism risk. His laboratory linked familial risk for autism to early variations in visual social engagement, motor coordination and activity level. Other research has examined patterns of familial aggregation in multiplex autism, defined as instances where two or more individuals in the same family are affected; knowledge gained from these studies helped specify the impact of combined influences of independently inherited traits on early childhood social development His work has also elucidated opportunities to resolve enduring disparities in developmental outcomes of minority children affected by autism. His research contributions have also addressed environmental influences on antisocial development including prospects for its prevention through parenting education and the prevention of maltreatment in early childhood.

== Representative publications ==
- Constantino, J. N.; Zhang, Y. I.; Frazier, T.; Abbacchi, A. M.; Law, P. (2010). "Sibling recurrence and the genetic epidemiology of autism". American Journal of Psychiatry. 167 (11): 1349–1356.
- Constantino JN, Gruber CP (2012) The Social Responsiveness Scale Manual, Second Edition (SRS-2). Los Angeles, CA: Western Psychological Services.
- Constantino, JN (2018). "Prevention of child maltreatment: strategic targeting of a curvilinear relationship between adversity and psychiatric impairment". World Psychiatry. 17 (1): 103–104. doi:10.1002/wps.20495. PMC 5775142. PMID 29352551.
- Constantino, JN (2019). "Early behavioral indices of inherited liability to autism". Pediatr Res. 85 (2): 127–133. doi:10.1038/s41390-018-0217-3. PMC 6353672. PMID 30356093.
- Constantino, JN; Charman, T; Jones, EJH (Sep 2020). "Clinical and Translational Implications of an Emerging Developmental Substructure for Autism. Annu Rev Clin Psychol. 2021 May 7;17:365-389 Broder-Fingert S, Mateo CM, Zuckerman KE. Structural Racism and Autism". Pediatrics. 146 (3): e2020015420.
