= Autism (journal) =

Academic journal for autism research

- Discipline: Psychiatry
- Language: English
- Edited by: Sue Fletcher-Watson

Publication details
- History: 1997–present
- Publisher: SAGE Publications
- Frequency: 8/year
- Open access: Hybrid
- Impact factor: 6.684 (2021)

Standard abbreviations
- ISO 4: Autism

Indexing
- ISSN: 1362-3613 (print); 1461-7005 (web)
- LCCN: 97641074
- OCLC no.: 41550873

Links
- Journal homepage; Online access; Online archive

Autism is a peer-reviewed academic journal covering research on autism. It is published eight times a year by SAGE Publications in association with the National Autistic Society. The journal was established in 1997 and the editor-in-chief is Sue Fletcher-Watson (University of Edinburgh).

The cover originally contained a puzzle piece but this was removed in 2018 after the journal decided that it evoked a negative public perception.

== Editors-in-chief ==
The following persons are or have been editor-in-chief:

- Rita Jordan (University of Birmingham, 1997–2006)
- Patricia Howlin (Institute of Psychiatry, 1997–2007)
- Dermot M. Bowler (City, University of London, 2006–2012)
- David Mandell (University of Pennsylvania School of Medicine, 2012–2022)
- Sue Fletcher-Watson (University of Edinburgh, 2022–present)

== Abstracting and indexing ==
The journal is abstracted and indexed in:

- CINAHL
- CSA databases
- Current Contents/Social and Behavioral Sciences
- EBSCO databases
- Education Resources Information Center
- Embase
- FRANCIS
- Index Medicus/MEDLINE/PubMed
- PASCAL
- ProQuest databases
- PsycINFO
- Social Sciences Citation Index
- Scopus

According to the Journal Citation Reports, the journal has a 2021 impact factor of 6.684.
