= Neuroqueer theory =

Framework intersecting neurodiversity and queer theory

Neuroqueer theory is a framework that intersects the fields of neurodiversity and queer theory. It examines the ways society constructs and defines normalcy, particularly concerning gender, sexual orientation, and dis/ability, and challenges those constructions. It critiques the pathologization of neurodivergent individuals and the ways in which it intersects with the marginalization of queer individuals. Neuroqueer theory is reliant on a deep understanding of intersectionality, the way in which people's social, cultural, and political identities combine and result in unique combinations of privilege and discrimination.

The term neuroqueer can be used as a verb, adjective, or identity label. As a verb, it refers to the act of challenging neuronormativity and heteronormativity, as well as advocating for recognition and celebration of diverse experiences and identities. As an adjective, neuroqueer describes phenomena, theories, or identities that challenge neuronormativity and heteronormativity, emphasizing the intersections and diversity of queer and neurodivergent identities and experiences. Individuals who identify as neuroqueer are often neurodivergent and queer, though this is not a necessity. Nick Walker, who initially coined the term, has indicated that neurotypical, cisgender, heterosexual individuals may also identify as neuroqueer if they are actively challenging neuronormativity and heteronormativity, especially if they are challenging the existing categorizations of gender, dis/ability label, or sexual orientation. Recent studies have suggested the existence of a relationship between queerness and neurodivergence: where neurodivergent people are more likely than their neurotypical peers to identify as LGBTQIA+, and gender diverse people are more likely to be neurodivergent than their cisgender peers. At the present time, the reason for the connection between queerness and neurodivergence is not known, though several hypotheses exist, they each require further investigation.

== Definition ==
Neuroqueer was initially conceptualized as a verb—neuroqueering—as a way of "queering [...] neurocognitive norms as well as gender norms". Walker has indicated that, as a verb, neuroqueer "refers to a broad range of interrelated practices", and "as an adjective, it describes things that are associated with those practices or that result from those practices".

Nick Walker, Athena Lynn Michaels-Dillon, and Remi Yergeau established the following eight integral components:

1. As an adjective, neuroqueer can refer to people who are "both neurodivergent and queer, with some degree of conscious awareness and/or active exploration around how these two aspects of one's being entwine and interact".
2. As an adjective, neuroqueer means "embodying and expressing one's neurodivergence in ways that also queer one's performance of gender, sexuality, ethnicity, and/or other aspects of one's identity".
3. As a verb, neuroqueer means "engaging in practices intended to undo and subvert one's own cultural conditioning and one's ingrained habits of neuronormative and heteronormative performance, with the aim of reclaiming one's capacity to give more full expression to one's uniquely weird potentials and inclinations".
4. As a verb, neuroqueer means "engaging in the queering of one's own neurocognitive processes (and one's outward embodiment and expression of those processes) by intentionally altering them in ways that create significant and lasting increase in one's divergence from prevailing cultural standards of neuronormativity and heteronormativity".
5. As a verb, neuroqueer means "approaching, embodying, and/or experiencing one's neurodivergence as a form of queerness".
6. As a verb, neuroqueer means "producing literature, art, scholarship, and/or other cultural artifacts that foreground neuroqueer experiences, perspectives, and voices".
7. As a verb, neuroqueer means "producing critical responses to literature and/or other cultural artifacts, focusing on intentional or unintentional characterizations of neuroqueerness and how those characterizations illuminate and/or are illuminated by actual neuroqueer lives and experiences".
8. As a verb, neuroqueer means "working to transform social and cultural environments in order to create spaces and communities— and ultimately a society— in which engagement in any or all of the above practices is permitted, accepted, supported, and encouraged".

Although these core concepts have been described, Walker and others argue that the neuroqueer community often "actively resist[s] any authoritative definition". As such, any "conceptualization should not be viewed as comprehensive or definitive. Never static, the term neuroqueer is fluid, shifting, and always adapting".

== History ==
Neuroqueer theory grew from the existing fields of disability studies and queer theory. The former arose as a field of scholarship in the 1970s following the disability rights movement and sought to center the perspectives of disabled people, as well as challenge existing understandings of disability. This resulted in the social model of disability, which views disability as a societal failure rather than an individual deficit. For example, the social model of disability argues that a deaf person is disabled not by their inability to hear but rather by societal structures that privilege hearing; as such, to reduce barriers, society should provide greater access for deaf people, such as access to sign language interpreters and audio captioning, rather than asking the deaf person to use hearing aids and cochlear implants.

Since the rise of disability studies and the disability rights movement, both scholars and disabled people have critiqued the lack of focus on mental disability and chronic illness. This resulted in the development of mad studies and other disciplines. The term neurodivergence arose in the 1990s to challenge narratives that described mental disabilities as deficits, especially relating to autism. The term has also been used to facilitate discussions on the diversity of neurological function and performance. Further, many advocates and scholars have argued against using person-first language (e.g., "person with autism") when referring to neurodivergent people, as they view neurodivergence in the context of identity and not pathology and believe it should not be separated from one's personhood.

Queer theory emerged in the 1990s to analyze and challenge heteronormativity. Queer theorists have often used the verb to queer to refer to the act of idealizing and inventing an ever-evolving future through new methods of examining the world and how we live in it.

Nick Walker coined the term neuroqueer in 2008, though Athena Lynn Michaels-Dillon had also independently coined the phrase, and Remi Yergeau had been considering the concept, as well, referring to it as neurological queerness. Walker used the term in relation to queer theory to "examin[e] how socially-imposed neuronormativity and socially-imposed heteronormativity were entwined with one another, and how the queering of either of those two forms of normativity entwined with and blended into the queering of the other one." The word neuroqueer first appeared in print on the back cover of Michaels-Dillon's novel Defiant (2015) and in Yergeau's Authoring Autism (2018).

The use of neuroqueer has since grown to refer to a field of academic study, as well as an identity label. Some people argue that because ableism has defined what is considered "normal", where neurodivergent and queer people are deemed "atypical", recognition of person-first language and "celebrated differences" do not shift ableist constructions of neurological functioning. These same scholars and activist say that people who identify as neuroqueer actively reject ableist assimilation practices; by embracing their selfhood and refusing to conform, they are queering their existence, actions, and behaviors in social spaces.

== Applications ==
Neurodivergence has been pathologized and associated with various conditions, including autism, attention deficit-hyperactivity disorder, and specific learning differences, among others. Neuroqueer theory aims to depathologize such differences and as such, has implications across diverse sectors, including education and research.

=== Education ===
Because neurodivergence has been pathologized, educational institutions generally view neurodivergence as a deficit and focus on what students are not able to do or learn. Therefore, educational institutions tend to take steps to "correct" the ways students act, behave, and learn in schools that do not fit into the social expectations, in line with rehabilitative, behaviorist and interventionist approaches. Similarly, educational research regarding neurodivergent individuals, based on discrete measures of performance, regularly points to evidence-based practices and strategies as a means to help students improve their academic skills throughout different content areas. Neuroqueer theory rejects the pathologization of neurodivergence and thus pedagogical and research approaches which focus on "fixing" students, so they fit into the standards set by their neurotypical peers. Within education, neuroqueer theory aims to serve students with intersecting identities related to gender, sexuality, and dis/ability, by reframing educational spaces. By reframing educational spaces, neuroqueer theory aims to center and better serve students who have historically been not centered or recognized for their contributions. By centering neuroqueer voices and neuroqueering educational spaces, neuroqueer theory hopes make future pedagogical approaches and research inquiries more radically inclusive.

=== Intersections of gender, sexuality, and disability ===
Neuroqueer theory is reliant on an understanding of intersectionality.

Through popular media and research, disabled people are often viewed as asexual and agender, especially when they do not conform to expectations on how gender is "typically" performed, as is common for neurodivergent people. This not only leads to the infantilization of dis/abled people but can also restrict access to certain communities, resources, and support; this is especially of concern for individuals who also identify as 2SLGBTQ+.

==== Relationship between queerness and neurodivergence ====
While there is no definite explanation as to why there is a relationship between being neurodivergent and queer, there are several hypotheses that seek to explain the connection. One hypothesis is that neurodivergent people, especially autistic individuals, are less influenced by societal norms, and therefore less likely to feel the need to conform to societal expectations of gender and sexuality and more likely to express themselves without the fear of judgement. The experiences of neurodivergent, queer, and neuroqueer individuals are not monolithic, this includes how and to what degree individuals experience the fear of judgement. Another hypothesis suggests prenatal mechanisms, like sex steroid hormones, which shape the brain's development, including the development of autism and other neurodevelopmental conditions, also contributes to gender role behavior, yet more research is needed to better understand this potential connection.

==== Prejudice based on intersectional identities ====
Neuroqueer theory is reliant on the idea of intersectionality, where the various identities an individual holds cannot be separated from each other as the ways they interact produce unique experience of privilege and discrimination. Holding a multiple minority status can contribute to greater levels and unique forms of prejudice and discrimination. Having membership in multiple minority identity communities can contribute to isolation within both communities as a result of holding traits from multiple groups simultaneously.

Both queer and neurodivergent identity communities face a lack of support and understanding. Individuals within queer and neurodivergent communities are more likely than their neurotypical, heterosexual, and cisgender peers to engage in self-harm, suicidal ideation, and suicidal behaviors.

Individuals can also be discriminated against for holding a specific identity. In one study, one third of autistic participants reported they had been repeatedly questioned about their gender identity, due to prejudice against their diagnosis, which questioned their competence and understanding of self. For neurodivergent individuals, neurodiversity is often closely linked with their sense of identity and can inform how they understand their identities.

== Scholars ==
- M. Remi Yergeau
- Nick Walker (scholar)

== See also ==
- Disability and LGBTQ identities
- Queer studies
- Alison Kafer
- Autism and LGBTQ identities
- Crip theory
- Queer Crips
- Homosexuality and psychology
