= Neurodiversity =

Non-pathological explanation of mental function variations

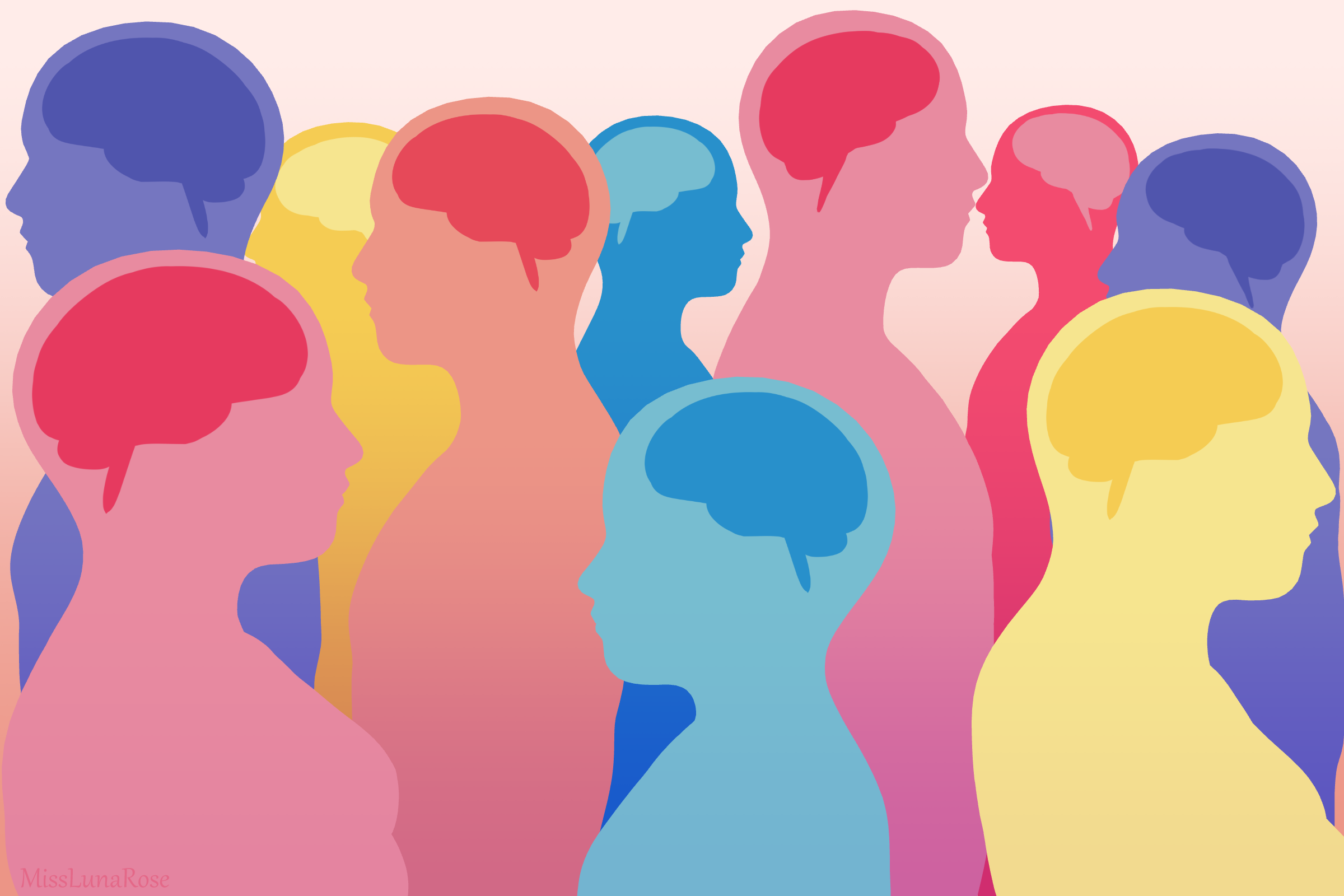
Autistic art depicting the natural diversity of human minds

The neurodiversity paradigm is a framework for understanding human brain function that considers the diversity within sensory processing, motor abilities, social comfort, cognition, and focus as neurobiological differences. This diversity falls on a spectrum of neurocognitive differences. The neurodiversity movement views autism and other neurodivergences as a natural part of human neurological diversity—not diseases or disorders, just "difference[s]".

Neurodivergences include autism, attention deficit hyperactivity disorder (ADHD), bipolar disorder, developmental prosopagnosia, developmental speech disorders, dyslexia, dysgraphia, dyspraxia, dyscalculia, dysnomia, intellectual disability, obsessive–compulsive disorder (OCD), sensory processing disorder, synesthesia, Tourette syndrome, and more.

The neurodiversity movement started in the late 1980s and early 1990s with the start of Autism Network International. Much of the correspondence that led to the formation of the movement happened over autism conferences, namely the autistic-led Autreat, penpal lists, and Usenet. The framework grew out of the disability rights movement and builds on the social model of disability, arguing that disability partly arises from societal barriers and person-environment mismatch (e.g. the double empathy problem theory by Damian Milton), rather than attributing disability purely to inherent deficits. It instead situates human cognitive variation in the context of biodiversity and the politics of minority groups. Some neurodiversity advocates and researchers, including Judy Singer and Patrick Dwyer, argue that the neurodiversity paradigm is the middle ground between a strong medical model and a strong social model.

Neurodivergent individuals face unique challenges in education, in their social lives, and in the workplace. The efficacy of accessibility and support programs in career development and higher education differs from individual to individual. Social media has introduced a platform where neurodiversity awareness and support has emerged, further promoting the neurodiversity movement.

The neurodiversity paradigm has been controversial among disability advocates, especially proponents of the medical model of autism, with opponents arguing it risks downplaying the challenges associated with some disabilities (e.g., in those requiring little support becoming representative of the challenges caused by the disability, thereby making it more difficult to seek desired treatment), and that it calls for the acceptance of things some wish to be treated for. In recent years, to address these concerns, some neurodiversity advocates and researchers have attempted to reconcile what they consider different seemingly contradictory but arguably partially compatible perspectives. Some researchers, such as Patrick Dwyer, Ari Ne'eman and Sven Bölte, have advocated for mixed, integrative or combined approaches that involve both neurodiversity approaches and biomedical approaches, for example teaching functional communication (whether verbal or nonverbal) and treating self-injurious behaviors or co-occurring conditions like epilepsy and depression with biomedical approaches.

== History and developments ==
The word neurodiversity first appeared in publication in 1998, in an article by American journalist Harvey Blume, as a portmanteau of the words neurological diversity, which had been used as early as 1996 in online spaces such as InLv to describe the growing concept of a natural diversity in humanity's neurological expression. The same year, it was published in Judy Singer's sociology honors thesis, drawing on discussions on the independent living mailing list that included Blume. Singer has described herself as "likely somewhere on the autistic spectrum".

Blume was an early advocate who predicted the role the Internet would play in fostering the international neurodiversity movement. In a New York Times piece on June 30, 1997, Blume described the foundation of neurodiversity using the term neurological pluralism. Some authors also credit the earlier work of autistic advocate Jim Sinclair in laying the foundation for the movement. Sinclair's 1993 speech "Don't Mourn For Us" emphasized autism as a way of being, claiming "it is not possible to separate the person from the autism."

The neurodiversity movement grew largely from online interaction. The internet's design lent well to the needs of many autistic people. People socialized over listservs and IRCs. Some of the websites used for organizing in the neurodiversity movement's early days include sites like Autistics.Org and Autistic People Against Neuroleptic Abuse. Core principles were developed from there. Principles such as advocating for the rights and autonomy of all people with brain disabilities with a focus on autism. The main conflicts from the beginning were about who the real experts on autism are, what causes autism, what interventions are appropriate, and who gets to call themselves autistic. During the 2000s, people started blogs such as Mel Baggs' Ballastexistenz and Kevin Leitch's Left Brain Right Brain. Eventually, Autistic Self Advocacy Network (ASAN) was started by Ari Ne'eman and Scott Robertson to further align the neurodiversity movement with the greater disability rights movement. ASAN led the Ransom Notes Campaign to successfully remove stigmatizing disability ads posted by the NYU Child Study Center. This was a massive turning point for the neurodiversity movement.

From there, the neurodiversity movement continued to grow with the formation of more organizations in the early 2010s such as Autistic Women & Nonbinary Network and The Thinking Person's Guide to Autism. More autistic people were appointed to federal advisory boards like Interagency Autism Coordinating Committee and National Council on Disability. There were various campaigns like the ongoing #StopTheShock related to the use of aversive treatment at Judge Rotenberg Center and various protests against Autism Speaks. Various flashblogs popped up during the 2010s to support campaigns. Annual traditions were formed such as Disability Day of Mourning and Autistics Speaking Day.

Damian Milton notes that, in 2014, Nick Walker attempted to define neurodiversity, the neurodiversity movement, and the neurodiversity paradigm. Walker tied neurodiversity to the idea that "all brains are to a degree unique". She also defined the movement as a rights movement, and the paradigm as a broader discussion of diversity, cultural constructions and social dynamics.

An important question is which neurodivergences traditionally viewed as disorders should be depathologized and exempt from attempts to remove them. Autistic advocate Nick Walker suggested preserving "forms of innate or largely innate neurodivergence, like autism" while conditions like epilepsy or traumatic brain injury could be removed from the person without fundamentally changing the person because these are not pervasively linked to the individual's personality or perception of the world.

== Scientific debates, research findings, and neurodiversity-based reforms ==
In recent years, the concept of neurodiversity and many related findings that challenged traditional knowledge and practices in the autism field have gained traction among many members of the scientific and professional communities, who have argued that autism researchers and practitioners have sometimes been too ready to interpret differences as deficits and such deficit-oriented and neuronormative approaches may cause harm. It has also been suggested that there are both ethical issues and practical risks in attempting to reduce or suppress some autistic traits (e.g. some stimming behaviors that do not cause harm to self or others, focused interests) that can sometimes be adaptive or instilling neurotypical social behaviors (e.g. eye contact, body language) through interventions. Researchers and advocates are concerned about such issues and risks as most recent studies and multiple systematic reviews have indicated that higher levels of masking, passing as neurotypical, or camouflaging are generally associated with poorer mental health outcomes including depression, clinical anxiety, and suicidality among autistic people (including children, adolescents, and adults) and across various regions or cultures. (Note: See the following:) In addition, three reviews published in 2024 and 2025 indicated some forms of repetitive behaviors can be adaptive for sensory regulation and emotional regulation of some autistic people, and masking or suppressing some autistic repetitive behaviors that can be adaptive may risk worsening mental health and well-being. One multiple-year longitudinal study found that autistic children who showed decrease in repetitive behaviors experienced more severe and worsening in mental health symptoms, whereas autistic children who showed increase in repetitive behaviors experienced less severe mental health challenges. Relatedly, qualitative studies have shown some forms of applied behavioral interventions increase camouflaging or masking of autistic traits (e.g. stimming) for some autistic people, with negative effects on mental health. In addition, quantitative evidence regarding adverse effects (e.g. in terms of trauma, worsened mental health or mental health hospitalizations, reinforcement of masking or making autistic people "look normal") of some applied behavioral interventions is emerging, and appears widespread (with roughly 40–80% of autistic participants reporting such negative experiences across multiple studies). Apart from studies on adverse effects of early behavioral interventions, multiple dozens of qualitative studies, including studies systematically reviewed by Brede et al. (2022) have shown negative experiences accessing and receiving mental health services (e.g. lack of accurate understanding from clinicians, iatrogenic harm) are common and reported by most autistic participants.

Descriptive statements of autism
	Disordered	Intrinsic disability	Intrinsic impairment	Social determinism	Superpower
	autism is a disorder	disability is intrinsic to an individual	impairment is intrinsic to an individual	disability is an impairment unaccommodated by society	autism is largely positive, with little negative implications
Social model	abstains	disagrees	agrees	agrees	disagrees
Neurodiversity movement	disagrees	varying views	agrees	agrees	varying views
Medical pathology paradigm	agrees	agrees	agrees	disagrees	disagrees

Moreover, researchers have found that psychoeducation based on the medical model is associated with higher stigma. Another study found that endorsements of normalization and curative goals (goals of some medical models) are associated with heightened stigma. Similarly, some researchers and advocates also argue that a medicalizing approach can contribute to stigma and ableism, and that the persistent focus on biological research in autism based on deficit-based medical model is at odds with the priorities of those in the autism community.

The neurodiversity paradigm is controversial in autism advocacy. A prevalent criticism is that autistic people with higher support needs would continue to have challenges even if society was fully accommodating and accepting of them. Some critics of the neurodiversity paradigm, such as family members that are responsible for the care of such an autistic individual, think it might lead to overlooking or downplaying these challenges. In response, it has been stated that neurodiversity does not deny disability and support needs and that not having certain abilities or needing support is not intrinsically a bad thing, because notions of normal functioning are culturally and economically relative and historically contingent and there are cultures in which questions like "Will my child ever be able to live independently?" or "Who will care for my child after I die?" do not arise because support is provided by other members of the community as a matter of course.

Prescriptive statements on autism
	Participatory interventions	Integrationary interventions	Environmental modifications	Participatory research
	interventions should prioritize outcomes deemed important by the autistic person	interventions should give autistic people the skills to appear closer to a species-norm	an autistic person's environment should be modified to better suit them	every stage of autism studies should involve autistic input
Social model	agrees	disagrees	agrees	agrees
Neurodiversity movement	agrees	varying views	agrees	agrees
Medical pathology paradigm	disagrees	agrees		

Some scholars have noted points of contact between the neurodiversity movement and evolutionary psychiatry and evolutionary psychology. A 2024 perspective in Autism Research argued that evolutionary psychiatry can, in some contexts, support neurodiversity's goals by framing certain neurocognitive traits as part of human variation while remaining agnostic about clinical management or rights‑based advocacy. Related commentaries in psychiatric journals have encouraged careful evaluation of evolutionary accounts of autism alongside neurodiversity perspectives.

Autistic self-advocate and researcher Ari Ne'eman has suggested a trait-based approach, where elements of the medical (or pathology) model can be applied in treating certain traits, behaviors, or conditions that are intrinsically harmful (e.g. self-injury behaviors, epilepsy, or other co-occurring health conditions), while neurodiversity approaches can be applied to non-harmful or sometimes adaptive autistic traits (e.g. some stimming behaviors that do not result in self-injury, intense interests) of the same individual. Relatedly, some neurodiversity researchers, as well as autistic people, advocates and researchers, have advocated for application and sometimes integration or combination of both neurodiversity approaches and biomedical research plus practice.

In recent years, researchers, providers of various support services, and neurodivergent people have advocated for more neurodiversity-affirming support services/therapies, with both new therapy strategies being developed and advancements or reforms of existing therapy strategies (e.g. social skills programs, applied behavior analysis (ABA) interventions, occupational therapy) informed by experiences, strengths, interests, preferences, and feedback of autistic people as well as neurodiversity approaches and findings, with some evidence for beneficial effects. In addition, some researchers and advocates have called for more neurodiversity-affirming and lived-experience informed psychoeducation and stigma reduction methods.

== Neurodivergent and neurotypical/neuroconforming ==
According to Kassiane Asasumasu, who coined the terms in the year 2000, neurodivergent/neurodivergence refers to those "whose neurocognitive functioning diverges from dominant societal norms in multiple ways". She emphasized that it should not be used to exclude people but rather to include them and therefore intended for these terms to apply to a broad variety of people, not just people with neurodevelopmental differences, such as autism, attention-deficit hyperactivity disorder, and dyslexia. It is also used as an umbrella term to describe people with atypical mental and behavioral traits, such as mood, personality, sensory processing, and eating disorders. However, people with some neurological conditions, such as cerebral palsy, Parkinson's disease, and multiple sclerosis, are normally excluded.

Under the neurodiversity framework, these differences are often referred to as neurodivergences, in an effort to challenge the medical model of disability (sometimes referred to in the neurodiversity community as the "pathology paradigm"). This term provided activists a way to advocate for increased rights and accessibility for people with atypical neurocognitive functioning, both autistic and non-autistic.

Neurotypical (an abbreviation of neurologically typical, sometimes NT) is a neologism widely used in the neurodiversity movement as a label for anyone who has a neurotype that fits into the norm of thinking patterns. Thus, the term "neurotypical" includes anyone who is not autistic, and does not have ADHD, dyslexia, anxiety, or any other difference that would be considered neurodivergent. The term has been adopted by both the neurodiversity movement and some members of the scientific community.

Neuroscience writer Mo Costandi views terms like neurotypical as not being of use in neuroscience, while others, including Uta Frith and Francesca Happé, use the term freely. Ginny Russell mentions that there is no clear bimodal distribution separating autistic and non-autistic people because many non-autistic people have some autistic traits. Another criticism, that neurotypicality is a dubious construct because nobody can be considered truly neurotypical, has been said by Nick Walker to reflect a misunderstanding of the term because it is meant to describe those who can adapt to society's norms without much effort, not to imply that all neurotypical people's brains are the same.

Early definitions described neurotypicals as individuals who are not autistic. Early uses of NT were often satirical, as in the Institute for the Study of the Neurologically Typical, but it has been adopted by the neurodiversity movement too, and is now used in a serious manner.

In contrast to some of the shortcomings of terms like neurotypical (such as its underlying assumption that neurodivergent experiences are an anomaly, i.e., not typical), a growing group of advocates in the neurodivergent movement prefer other terms such as neuroconforming. The term allistic is also used, meaning 'not autistic'.

Neurodivergent individuals, like those with hyper-sensitive personality, face unique challenges in education, social life, and in the workplace. Career development and higher education programs and support are designed to be person-to-person. Social media has provided a platform where awareness and support for neurodiversity has emerged, further advancing the neurodiversity movement.

== Double empathy theory ==
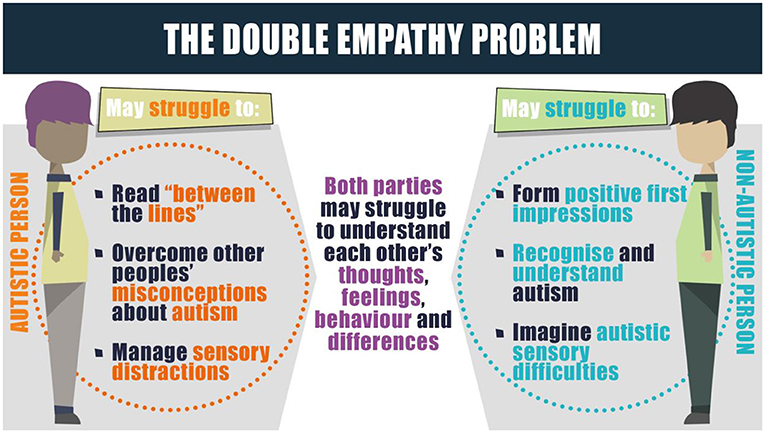
Both autistic and non-autistic people can find it difficult to empathize with each other. The fact that both people in the interaction have trouble with understanding and empathy is why the theory is called the "double empathy problem".

The theory of the double empathy problem argues that autistic people do not inherently lack empathy as often supposed by people who see autism as pathological, but most autistic people may struggle in understanding and empathizing with non-autistic people whereas most non-autistic people also lack understanding and empathy for autistic people. It was originally conceived in 2012 by autistic scholar Damian Milton. The theory argues that characteristics and experiences of autistic and non-autistic people are so different that it is hard for one to understand how the other thinks and empathize with each other; for example, non-autistic people may not understand when an autistic person is overwhelmed.

An increasing number of studies in the 2010s and 2020s have found support for double empathy theory and related concepts such as bidirectional social interaction. One study comparing the conversations and socialization of autistic groups, non-autistic groups, and mixed groups found that autistic people were more able to build rapport with other autistic people than with non-autistic people, and at a level similar to the purely non-autistic group. A systematic review published in 2024 found that most autistic people have good interpersonal relations and social-communication experiences with most autistic people, and interactions between autistic people are associated with better quality of life across multiple domains, including mental health and emotional well-being.

The double empathy problem theory implies there is no simple fix that can help each group better empathize with each other, but it is worthwhile to bridge the double empathy gap through more equal contact and enhancing public understanding and empathy about autistic people based on neurodiversity-affirming approaches. The advantage of the theory is reducing pathologization of autistic people by identifying that most people struggle to empathize with people with different neurotypes. It can also help neurotypical individuals to better understand how neurodivergent people think and empathize and to recognize their own limitations in empathizing with autistic people. Jaswal and Akhtar (2019) highlight the difference between being socially uninterested and appearing socially uninterested, and challenge preconceived notions of a lack of social motivation. For example, testimonies from autistic individuals report that avoiding eye contact serves an important function of helping them to concentrate during conversation, and should not be interpreted as expressing social disinterest.

== Neurodiversity lite ==
The term neurodiversity lite has been used to describe a diluted form of the neurodiversity paradigm that has appeared as the concept has entered mainstream discourse. The phrase is used to refer to applications of neurodiversity language that emphasise difference as a benign or fashionable form of human diversity, but critics argue that these applications omit the paradigm's original grounding in disability rights and structural critiques of ableism.

In this framing, neurodiverse conditions, e.g. autism and ADHD are often associated with positive traits (or "superpowers"), including attention to detail, memory and pattern recognition (autism), as well as calmness under pressure, creativity and risky problem-solving (ADHD). The two sets of strengths can compensate for each other's weaknesses. This perspective has been linked to reductions in stigma, increased self-acceptance, and the promotion of workplace initiatives that seek to recognise neurodivergent strengths.

Commentators have also identified limitations in the concept. Critics note that it may overemphasise exceptional abilities while downplaying the barriers faced by individuals with high support needs, intellectual disabilities, or limited speech. This tendency has been described as particularly evident in corporate and media discourses, where neurodivergence is portrayed as a "superpower" aligned with productivity and innovation, often positioning autistic people as desirable employees in science, technology, engineering, and mathematics fields. Critics argue that such portrayals highlight individuals who can succeed in neurotypical environments with minimal accommodations, while overlooking those who require greater support.

Scholars suggest that by centring traits valued by institutions, such as technical skills or problem-solving ability, neurodiversity-lite may promote forms of inclusion that do not address accessibility or systemic barriers. Some commentators argue that this usage shifts neurodiversity from a rights-based and justice-oriented paradigm toward a branding strategy.

== Within disability rights movements ==
The neurodiversity paradigm was developed and embraced first by autistic people, but has been applied to other conditions such as attention deficit hyperactivity disorder (ADHD), developmental speech disorders, dyslexia, dysgraphia, dyspraxia, dyscalculia, dysnomia, intellectual disability, developmental prosopagnosia, obsessive–compulsive disorder, Tourette syndrome, schizophrenia, bipolar disorder, schizoaffective disorder, synesthesia, Angelman syndrome, sensory processing disorders, and, somewhat more controversially, personality disorders such as antisocial personality disorder. Neurodiversity advocates and organizations like the Autistic Self Advocacy Network (ASAN) do not agree with using medical interventions as a way to remove neurodevelopmental differences that are fundamentally linked to the personality and perception of the world, such as autism. Rather, they promote support systems such as inclusion-focused services, accommodations, communication and assistive technologies, occupational training, and independent living support. The intention is for individuals to receive support that honors human diversity and feel that they are able to freely express themselves. Other forms of interventions may cause them to feel as though they are being coerced or forced to adapt to social norms, or to conform to a behavioral standard or clinical ideal.

Proponents of neurodiversity strive to reconceptualize autism and related conditions in society by acknowledging that neurodivergence is not something that needs to be cured and that the idea of curing it makes no conceptual sense because differences like autism are so pervasive that removing the autistic parts of the person is tantamount to replacing the autistic person by a different person. An important aim is also changing the language from the current "condition, disease, disorder, or illness"-based nomenclature, "broadening the understanding of healthy or independent living", acknowledging new types of autonomy, and giving neurodivergent individuals more control over their interventions, including the type, timing, and whether there should be interventions at all.

The neurodiversity symbol, a rainbow infinity sign, describes the diversity of human brains.

Activists such as Jennifer White-Johnson have helped bring attention to the neurodiversity movement, by creating symbols of protest and recognition, including a combination of the black power fist and infinity symbol.

A 2009 study separated 27 students with conditions including autism, dyslexia, developmental coordination disorder, ADHD, and having suffered a stroke into two categories of self-view: "A 'difference' view—where neurodiversity was seen as a difference incorporating a set of strengths and weaknesses, or a 'medical/deficit' view—where neurodiversity was seen as a disadvantageous medical condition". They found that, although all of the students reported uniformly difficult schooling careers involving exclusion, abuse, and bullying, those who viewed themselves from the "difference" view (41% of the study cohort) "indicated higher academic self-esteem and confidence in their abilities and many (73%) expressed considerable career ambitions with positive and clear goals". Many of these students reported gaining this view of themselves through contact with neurodiversity advocates in online support groups.

A 2013 online survey which aimed to assess conceptions of autism and neurodiversity suggested that conception of autism as a difference, and not a deficit, is developmentally beneficial and "transcend[s] a false dichotomy between celebrating differences and ameliorating deficit".

Neurodiversity advocate John Elder Robison argues that the disabilities and strengths conferred by neurological differences may be mutually inseparable. "When 99 neurologically identical people fail to solve a problem, it's often the 1% fellow who's different who holds the key. Yet that person may be disabled or disadvantaged most or all of the time. To neurodiversity proponents, people are disabled because they are at the edges of the bell curve, not because they are sick or broken."

== Higher education ==
There are several models that are used to understand disability. There is the medical model of disability that views people as needing to be treated or cured. Another model is the social model of disability, which puts emphasis on the way that society treats people with disabilities. Through the social model of disability, the experiences of neurodivergent students in higher education are partially influenced by the reactions and attitudes of other students and the institution itself.

=== Experiences of neurodivergent students ===
The emotional experiences of neurodivergent students in higher education depend on a combination of factors, including the type of disability, the level of support needs, and the student's access to resources and accommodations. A common difficulty for neurodivergent students is maintaining social relationships, which can give rise to loneliness, anxiety, and depression. There is also the added stress and difficulty of transitioning into higher education, as well as the responsibilities and task management required in college. Many neurodivergent students may find that they need added support. As for academics, neurodivergent students may experience difficulties in learning, executive function, managing peer relationships in the classroom or in group work, and other difficulties that can affect academic performance and success in higher education. However, neurodivergent students may find that their differences are a strength and an integral part of their new social roles as adults.

=== Higher education institutions ===
The typical curriculum and format of higher education may pose as a challenge for neurodivergent students, and a lack of support and flexibility from staff may further complicate the university experience. Thus, reasonable adjustments are available to students who disclose their disabilities. However, these adjustments or accommodations may put an emphasis on academics, and less on the various challenges of higher education on neurodivergent students. For instance, neurodivergent students in higher education also report a need for non-academic supports, such as social mentorships and resources for strength-based interventions in order to further assist neurodivergent students in the social aspects of college life. Similarly, career preparation that is specifically targeted for neurodivergent students is lacking. There are several programs, such as supported employment, that exist to help assist neurodivergent individuals in finding and obtaining a job. However, many of these programs do not exist in schools. This can make it difficult for neurodivergent students to find a career path that they feel is attainable for them. Another consideration is the implementation of a universal design for learning approach (UDL) when building learning spaces or communal areas that considers the needs of neurodivergent students. A UDL design incorporates a design that accommodates the needs of all students, including the neurodivergent population.

According to a 2023 article, universities and post-secondary establishments would show more tolerance towards neurodivergent people. A tolerant environment can increase autonomy, leading to kindness and understanding among students. Higher education institutions offer counseling and support services to students. However, neurodivergent students face particular challenges that impair their ability to receive consistent support and care. Additionally, counseling and support services face a lack of funding, personnel, and specialists that can adequately support neurodivergent students. Overall, these services work for some students and not for others.

Nachman and colleagues reviewed several articles published by two-year community colleges and found some discrepancies in the way that they perceived and categorized "disabled" students and "non-disabled" students. They found that all of the articles were attempting to normalize disability. Many of them put a distinct separation between typical and atypical learners as well as their potential academic achievement. Nachman also found that many of the articles showed a lack of autonomy for neurodivergent students. They had little power in regard to academic choices and classroom management.

== In the workplace ==
Neurodivergent individuals are subjected to bias when applying and interviewing for job positions. Specifically, neurodivergent individuals can have their social engagement style compared to neurotypical individuals, which can affect their ability to obtain a job. Stigmas against neurodivergence (especially against autistic individuals) and cognition challenges in social situations can hinder an individual's ability to perform well in a traditional job interview.

Organizations such as Specialisterne aim to use neurodivergent employees' particular skills – such as pattern recognition, detection of deviations, attention to detail, analytical thinking, and extended focus – in the workforce, as well as educate companies on supporting neurodivergent employees. Other organizations focus on specific professions, including Autistic Doctors International, Neurodiversity In Tech, and Neurodiversity in Law.

In a systematic review that considered developmental dyslexia as "an expression of neurodiversity", it was suggested that neurodiversity is not yet an established concept in the workplace, and therefore, support from social relationships and work accommodations is minimal. Furthermore, another systematic review that focused on pharmacological and combined pharmacological/psychosocial interventions for adults with attention deficit hyperactivity disorder found that there were few workplace-based intervention studies, and suggested that additional research needs to be conducted to figure out how to best support neurodivergent employees in the workplace.

=== Military service and conscription ===
Military policies around the world have excluded individuals with autism from service, which neurodiversity advocates argue is a form of discrimination.

In the United States, the Department of Defense officially bars all autistic individuals from joining the military. However, a soldier diagnosed with autism while already on active duty can continue to serve. This often leads to individuals pursuing a diagnosis in secret, as they fear it could jeopardise their careers. Advocates like Cortney Weinbaum argue that the military should embrace neurodiversity to enhance national security and that the U.S. government is wrong to classify neurodivergent individuals as disabled. They recommend systematic reforms, including providing accommodations, updating job descriptions, and training staff.

In Sweden, a policy of excluding autistic individuals from military service has led to legal challenges. While Sweden made changes to allow some individuals with mild ADHD to serve (due to more intense risk-seeking), it has maintained its strict exclusion of those with autism. This has prompted several lawsuits from neurodiversity advocates, who argue the policy is discriminatory. Erik Fenn, who was initially denied enlistment due to his autism diagnosis, successfully sued the government and was deemed eligible for conscription. As of early 2025, Fenn is serving, and the Swedish military is facing multiple lawsuits over its exclusionary policies.

== In social media ==
The increase in representation of the neurodiversity movement in the media came about with changes in the technology of the media platforms themselves. The recent addition of text-based options on various social media sites allows disabled users to communicate, enjoy, and share at a more accessible rate. Social media has a two-fold benefit to the neurodivergent community: it can help spread awareness and pioneer the neurodiversity movement, and it can also allow members of the communities themselves to connect.

=== Social media as a platform ===
Media platforms allow the connection of individuals of similar backgrounds to find a community of support with one another. Online networking and connections enable users to determine their comfort level in interactions, giving them control over their relationships with others. For the neurodivergent community, social media has proven to be a valuable tool for forming relationships, especially for those who find social situations challenging. By connecting neurodivergent users, media platforms provide "safe spaces" that are helpful in forming relationships. Some media developers have created platforms like "Blausm" that are designed specifically to connect neurodivergent users and families.

=== Social media as a driving force ===
Social media also allows users to spread awareness about the neurodiversity movement. Increasing awareness about mental conditions has been shown to increase the amount of factual information spread. The spread of information through social media exposure can assist the neurodiversity movement in educating the public about understanding disabilities such as autism and sifting out misinformation. By sharing neurodivergent experiences from a first-hand perspective, social media can educate the public and destigmatize certain conditions. Still, negative portrayals of neurodivergence can have an obstructive impact on members of the community.

Higher awareness and acceptance through social media can lead people to self-identify as neurodivergent. Generally, self-diagnosis is discouraged in psychiatry because it is thought to be wrong more often than a professional assessment and because it is said that it trivializes challenges by turning them into fashion labels. Robert Chapman, in contrast, questions the reliability of professional autism assessments as they often overlook the experiences of individuals who are not white cisgender male children and states that self-identification is not done for fashion purposes but because it helps understanding one's strengths and challenges. Sue Fletcher-Watson argues that because autism should not be classified as a disorder and no treatment should follow a diagnosis, autistic individuals should have the autonomy to self-identify as autistic, liberating them from the power of medical professionals in defining autism and determining who belongs to the autistic community. A group of researchers created a preliminary self-report questionnaire for autistic people.

=== Challenges within media ===
Although representation of the neurodivergent community has grown with the help of social media platforms, those users are often criticized and misunderstood. Social media has not entirely removed the social barriers that restrict inclusion of neurodivergent people. Some have reported needing to conform to the mainstream view of their disability to be seen as "authentic" users. Doing so has indirectly made it more difficult for neurodivergent users to grow platforms. Non-disabled users assessing the authenticity of neurodivergent individuals based on stereotypes indicates that the neurodiversity movement has not achieved its goal of inclusion.

== Clinical setting ==
=== Medicine and healthcare ===
Medical and healthcare professionals have begun to acknowledge neurodivergence among employees. Specifically, more groups are being created that are centered around advocacy and peer support among medical and healthcare professionals who associate themselves with neurodiversity, such as Autistic Doctors International, created by Dr. Mary Doherty. Another approach is the implementation of a 5-minute video summary (5MVS) for medical learners and physicians who have attention deficit hyperactivity disorder (ADHD). It consists of a 5-minute recorded video summary in which an engaging speaker presents the relevant information from a scientific article about ADHD using a brief PowerPoint presentation shared using videoconferencing technology. The researchers state that providing this educational tool for helping medical learners and physicians with ADHD acquire relevant information from scientific articles could help in addressing their inattention, impulsivity or hyperactivity, and improve their development of critical appraisal skills when working in healthcare.

Similarly, healthcare systems may benefit from hiring neurodivergent individuals to gain a unique perspective when caring for patients. Some healthcare staff agree that inviting neurodivergent individuals to join patient advisory groups or hiring them as staff are essential steps to acceptance and integration in the workforce. Neurodivergent people's unique strengths can be vital to health system innovation and improvement efforts. One example of the push toward this is the Stanford Neurodiversity Project, in which one of their goals is to discover the strengths of neurodivergent individuals and make use of their talents to increase innovation and productivity of their society, such as working in the field of healthcare and medicine.

Neurodiversity has also recently been investigated as a new way of working within neurodevelopmental clinics in the UK. A team of researchers in Portsmouth, England, have created an approach in aiding neurodivergent individuals known as PANDA, or the Portsmouth Alliance Neurodiversity Approach. This approach may help medical and healthcare professionals facilitate understanding, communication and early support for children who may identify as being neurodivergent.

== Therapy ==
Neurodiversity and the role it plays in therapeutic settings has been a central focal point in recent years. Many therapists and mental health professionals have pushed for more inclusive psychotherapeutic frameworks appropriate for neurodivergent individuals. One example is neurodivergence-informed therapy, which reframes dysfunction as interconnectedness among society rather than strictly individual, advocating for acceptance and pride in the neurodiversity community, and the push for therapists to pursue humility regarding the knowledge and education associated with individuals who identify as neurodivergent. Similarly, neurodiversity-affirming therapy supports neurodivergent differences, rather than viewing them as something that should be eliminated, and to offer ways to support the individual with difficult areas, while still appreciating their needs and strengths.

Therapeutic programs and interventions are also being investigated for the neurodivergent community. Self-determination programs that help neurodivergent individuals achieve their goals in life have been found to be successful, with neurodivergent participants finding it to be "appropriate, acceptable, and feasible". Various approaches (e.g., eye-tracking, longitudinal data, computational modeling) in understanding perceptual decision-making in neurodivergent individuals are also being studied and the implications it may have in the therapeutic environment in working with the neurodivergent population.

Another form of therapeutic intervention in that has been investigated in neurodivergent individuals is the use of Naturalistic Developmental Behavioral Interventions (NDBIs). NDBIs have been shown to have positive effects on language and social-communication while, at the same time, respecting individuals' needs and autonomy. One of the key goals in this type of intervention is putting the focus of therapy on the neurodivergent individual themselves in the creation of intervention goals, procedures, and outcomes. In doing so, they are likely to be seen as more acceptable, useful, and effective to that individual.

In addition to support from neurodiversity advocates for affirming therapies, concerns have been raised about the role of certain approaches such as applied behavior analysis. Neurodivergent individuals and activists tend to emphasize that these interventions aim to enforce conformity with expectations of society rather than addressing the needs of the person receiving the intervention. While a large body of research on the role of ABA seems to support its efficacy in cognitive and behavioral outcomes, a meta-analysis by Sandbank et al. challenges the evidence. Additionally, there are concerns regarding long-term mental health impacts and with the measures used in determining social validity by those who have raised these concerns. In addition to advocates from within the neurodivergent community, some behavioral analysts have begun to reconsider the role of these therapies with the context of a neurodiversity framework.

== See also ==
- Autistic Pride Day
- Mad pride
- Neuroqueer theory
- Neuroinclusive design
- Psychiatric survivors movement
