= Misdiagnosis of autism =

Autism, also known as autism spectrum disorder (ASD), is a condition characterized by impairment in social communication and interaction, as well as a need or strong preference for predictability and routine, sensory processing differences, focused interests, or repetitive behaviors, which can be misdiagnosed. In medicine, misdiagnoses or medical errors can occur when a diagnoses of autism is assigned to individuals not meeting the specific criteria, or when attributing an incorrect alternate diagnosis in cases where autism is the accurate condition. Oftentimes, a poor understanding of autism in women is understood to be the reason for this. The frequency of misdiagnosis is unknown, and poorly understood.

== Misdiagnosis ==
Autism can be misdiagnosed for a variety of reasons. Masking, the act of suppressing traditionally autistic behaviours to appear neurotypical, is a common reason for misdiagnosis, especially amongst women. Masking often makes it difficult for the specialist making the diagnosis to correctly understand the person's symptoms, which can lead to misdiagnosis. Almost a quarter of a sample of people who had received an autism diagnosis reported having received a prior mental diagnosis.

Several traits commonly associated with autism are also associated with other conditions, leading to misdiagnosis, such as; hypersensitivity to sounds and touch, often associated with anxiety disorders, and a difficulty recognising tone and other subtleties, often perceived as a lack of empathy.

=== Attention deficit hyperactivity disorder ===
Attention deficit hyperactivity disorder (ADHD) is characterised by inattention, hyperactivity and impulsivity. Although ADHD and autism often coexist, misdiagnosis happens and can be problematic, with a Dutch study showing that an initially incorrect ADHD diagnosis delays a correct autism diagnosis by 1.8 years on average. Overlapping symptoms include communication and social difficulties.

=== Borderline personality disorder ===
Borderline personality disorder (BPD) is a personality disorder characterised by a pervasive pattern of significant interpersonal relationship instability, a distorted sense of self, and intense emotional responses, and misdiagnosis often occurs with women. People with high-functioning autism are at a greater risk of being misdiagnosed as having BPD, and some experts, such as Pernille Darling Rasmussen, suggest that a diagnosis of ASD be thoroughly considered before BPD in such individuals.

=== Obsessive-compulsive disorder ===
Obsessive–compulsive disorder (OCD) has overlapping symptoms with autism, especially the need for routine and repetitive behaviour. However, for people with OCD, this is done to suppress or lessen obsessive behaviours, whereas autistic people do so to for the purpose of self-soothing, along with behaviours such as stimming.

=== Post–traumatic stress disorder ===
Post-traumatic stress disorder (PTSD) and autism have overlapping symptoms which can make it difficult to distinguish the two, especially avoidant and repetitive behaviours. The two conditions can be especially hard to distinguish in children, as it is generally harder to identify trauma in children than adults.

== Consequences ==
A misdiagnosis of autism is especially problematic for children, who may not receive adequate support in school if misdiagnosed.

== See also ==
- Misdiagnosis of borderline personality disorder
- Conditions comorbid to autism – Medical conditions more common in autistic people
