= Mortality of autistic individuals =

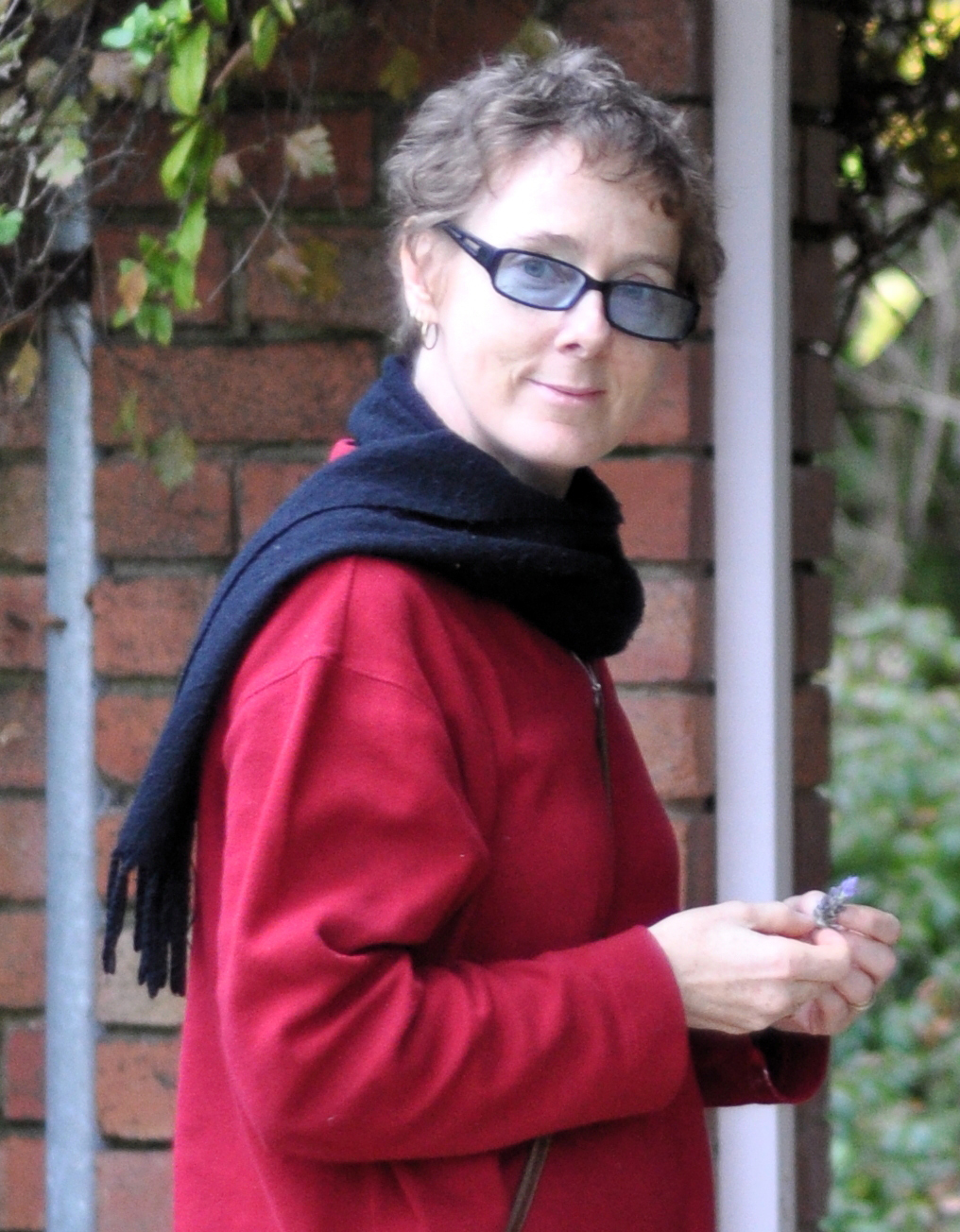
Donna Williams, an autistic woman who died on April 22, 2017, from cancer at the age of 53

There is some correlation between autism and reduced life expectancy, but study results are inconclusive as to whether autism and comorbidities are linked or whether individuals were unable to acquire proper and timely care options as in the neurotypical population. Furthermore, studies are limited to primarily having information about higher-needs populations.

Autistic individuals were once reported to have a significantly reduced life expectancy, on average approximately seventeen years shorter than that of the general population; however, this is no longer accepted in the scientific community as a blanket characteristic of autism due to problems and misrepresentation of the study conclusions.

Mortality rates during childhood and early adulthood can be notably higher. Various health conditions are more prevalent among autistic individuals, including epilepsy, cardiovascular diseases, and elevated suicide rates, particularly among those without co-occurring intellectual or learning disabilities; however, with the lack of study in autism and lack of comprehensive testing and diagnosis for autism, it is impossible to determine whether these comorbidities are related to autism or merely correlation (e.g. people already making regular visits to a doctor are more likely to have a diagnosis than those who have no reason for regular medical visits). Other common causes of death, such as respiratory, infectious, and digestive diseases, are comparable to those of the general population but may be exacerbated by side effects associated with long-term use of neuroleptic medications.

Socioeconomic disparities and a higher incidence of accidental deaths, including drownings, also contribute to increased mortality among higher-needs individuals. Historically, the autistic population have been vulnerable victims to infanticide. Among individuals with learning disabilities, women have the lowest life expectancy, which may be due to increased difficulty to access resources.

Early mortality among autistic individuals has been the subject of research since the 1990s, particularly in the more developed countries of the Anglosphere and Scandinavian countries. Identified as a "hidden crisis" in 2015, this phenomenon is primarily attributed to comorbidities associated with autism spectrum disorder (ASD), limited access to appropriate healthcare, and inadequate recognition and management of pain, especially among non-speaking individuals. Genetic predispositions and environmental factors may also play a role. Social exclusion has been linked to lack of awareness of support, lack of healthcare options, and increased suicide risk; while infanticide has been associated with broader social attitudes. Strategies to reduce early mortality include improved management of epilepsy, prevention of accidental drownings and sudden illnesses, enhanced suicide prevention measures, better communication between autistic individuals and healthcare providers, and promotion of regular physical activity.

== History ==
Research on autism and mortality is a relatively recent field. An elevated risk of accidental drowning among autistic individuals was identified as early as 1996. In 1999, Torben Isager and colleagues published a mortality study involving 381 autistic individuals in Denmark between 1945 and 1980. Among them, twelve had died, representing a higher mortality rate than in the general population. The causes of death included five cases of sudden illness, one additional case suspected to be due to sudden illness, four accidental deaths (three potentially linked to illness or personal difficulties), and two suicides. Half of the deceased individuals had been diagnosed with intellectual disability, while the other half had not.

In 2001, Robert M. Shavelle and colleagues conducted a study on mortality among autistic individuals in California between 1983 and 1997, identifying 202 deaths within a cohort of 13,111 individuals. The study is regarded as significant due to the size of the cohort and the methodology employed. Results indicated a higher mortality rate compared to the general population, particularly among women and individuals with co-occurring intellectual disabilities. The reported life expectancy was 62.5 years for women and 62 years for men. The main causes of death included sudden illness, respiratory diseases, suffocation, and drowning.

In 2008, a Danish study involving 341 individuals, as an update to a 1999 study, found that the mortality rate among autistic individuals was approximately twice that of the general population, with a higher rate observed among women.

In 2010, Christopher Gillberg and colleagues conducted a study on 120 autistic individuals born in Sweden between 1962 and 1984, reporting a mortality rate of 7.5%, which was 5.6 times higher than the general population. The study did not establish whether autism itself was a direct contributor to the observed outcomes. In 2013, Deborah Bilder and colleagues published findings from a study of 305 autistic individuals, identifying 29 deaths. The causes of death were primarily attributed to comorbid conditions rather than autism alone.

At the end of 2015, a study was published based on medical data from over 27,000 autistic individuals in Sweden, including approximately 6,500 with co-occurring intellectual disability. At the time of publication, it was considered one of the most comprehensive and reliable studies on autism and mortality, primarily due to the size and scope of the cohort. According to the researchers:

[...] our findings add to accumulating evidence that autism spectrum disorders result in substantial health loss throughout the lifespan.

— Tatja Hirvikoski, Ellenor Mittendorfer-Rutz, Marcus Boman, and Henrik Larsson

A systematic review and meta-analysis published in 2022 confirmed the elevated mortality risk among autistic individuals compared to the general population. In August 2023, a large-scale study conducted in the Ontario region of Canada examined mortality in relation to socio-economic factors among both autistic and non-autistic individuals.

== Clinical and social observations ==
Autism is classified as a neurodevelopmental disorder in the International Classification of Diseases (ICD-10) and is not considered a degenerative condition. However, it may be associated with comorbidities or perceptual differences that can contribute to reduced life expectancy or an increased risk of accidents, particularly in cases involving learning disabilities. Research indicates that the cognitive abilities of autistic individuals tend to remain stable with age and decline less significantly than in non-autistic individuals. Autism does not typically lead to age-related cognitive deterioration, such as a decline in working memory, although higher levels of disability or dependency may emerge over time. Studies estimate that between 20% and 25% of autistic adults experience a notable decline in cognitive function during adulthood. Many autistic adults also report a low quality of life and high levels of anxiety, which may result in social withdrawal and a perception of social environments as hostile.

=== Life expectancy ===
Autistic individuals have a reduced life expectancy compared to the general population, with estimates indicating a reduction of approximately 16 to 18 years on average. This gap may reach up to 30 years for those with co-occurring intellectual disabilities. Mortality rates among autistic individuals, particularly during childhood and early adulthood, are estimated to be two to ten times higher than in the general population. According to researcher Catherine Barthélémy, mortality between the ages of 2 and 30 is approximately three times higher. Although few studies have analyzed mortality by age group, available data suggest that the disparity decreases with age, with the life expectancy gap narrowing to about three years after age 65.

While mortality rates reported in various studies differ, all consistently indicate elevated mortality among autistic individuals, particularly due to neurological conditions such as epilepsy, and suicide. Data from New South Wales, Australia, based on a cohort of 35,929 individuals, show a mortality rate 2.06 times higher in the autistic population compared to the general population.

Life expectancy for autistic individuals may be improving globally, as medical advancements allow for earlier identification and treatment of conditions that previously led to premature death. Factors contributing to reduced life expectancy include cognitive impairments, increased vulnerability to illness, comorbidities, social exclusion, sensory hypersensitivity, and age-related health challenges.

=== Limitations of studies ===
The studies conducted in this field are primarily American, British, and Scandinavian (Swedish and Danish), and remain relatively limited due to a lack of international research on autistic adults. As Josef Schovanec (2017) points out, the suicide rate among autistic individuals "is one of the taboos of public debate" in France: their mortality is the subject of neither study nor public interest in this country—likely due to a focus on childhood and to practices that certain medical-social institutions seek to conceal (such as overmedication with neuroleptics).

French whistleblower Céline Boussié denounced the deaths of five children in a medico-educational institute (IME) in Gers. The published studies also present certain limitations, such as the inclusion of individuals previously diagnosed with "psychosis," some of whom may be schizophrenic, a condition known to be associated with a high risk of suicide. The available data are further constrained by the disappearance of a significant number of autistic adults from statistics for various reasons (e.g., name changes, relocation). Suicide studies, which are also limited in number, "have generally used small, non-representative samples, lack validated measures, and have not explored risk or protective factors."

Autism was first scientifically described in the 1940s, with the earliest diagnosed individuals reaching approximately 70 years of age by 2015. Research on aging and end-of-life issues in autism remains "almost entirely unexplored" (as of 2008), limiting knowledge of measures to enhance quality of life. Due to the disproportionate focus on autistic children, autistic adults (including the elderly) receive little attention in research and public discourse.

=== Gender differences ===
Since 1985, when Marion Leboyer examined differences in mortality between autistic males and females, studies have reported higher early mortality rates among autistic women compared to men, with some estimates suggesting rates up to four times higher. However, variations in reported gender-based mortality rates indicate measurement imprecision.

One possible explanation is sampling bias, as women are less frequently diagnosed with autism, potentially skewing data toward those with more severe or visible medical conditions. Causes and ages of death are generally similar between genders, though men are more likely to die from nervous and circulatory system disorders, while women have higher mortality from endocrine diseases, congenital malformations, and suicide. A meta-analysis found autistic women have a suicide rate twice that of men, though a review by Magali Segers suggests men are more likely to die by suicide.

Autistic women with learning disabilities have the shortest life expectancy. Among autistic individuals without an intellectual disability, overall mortality is higher among men.

=== Murders ===
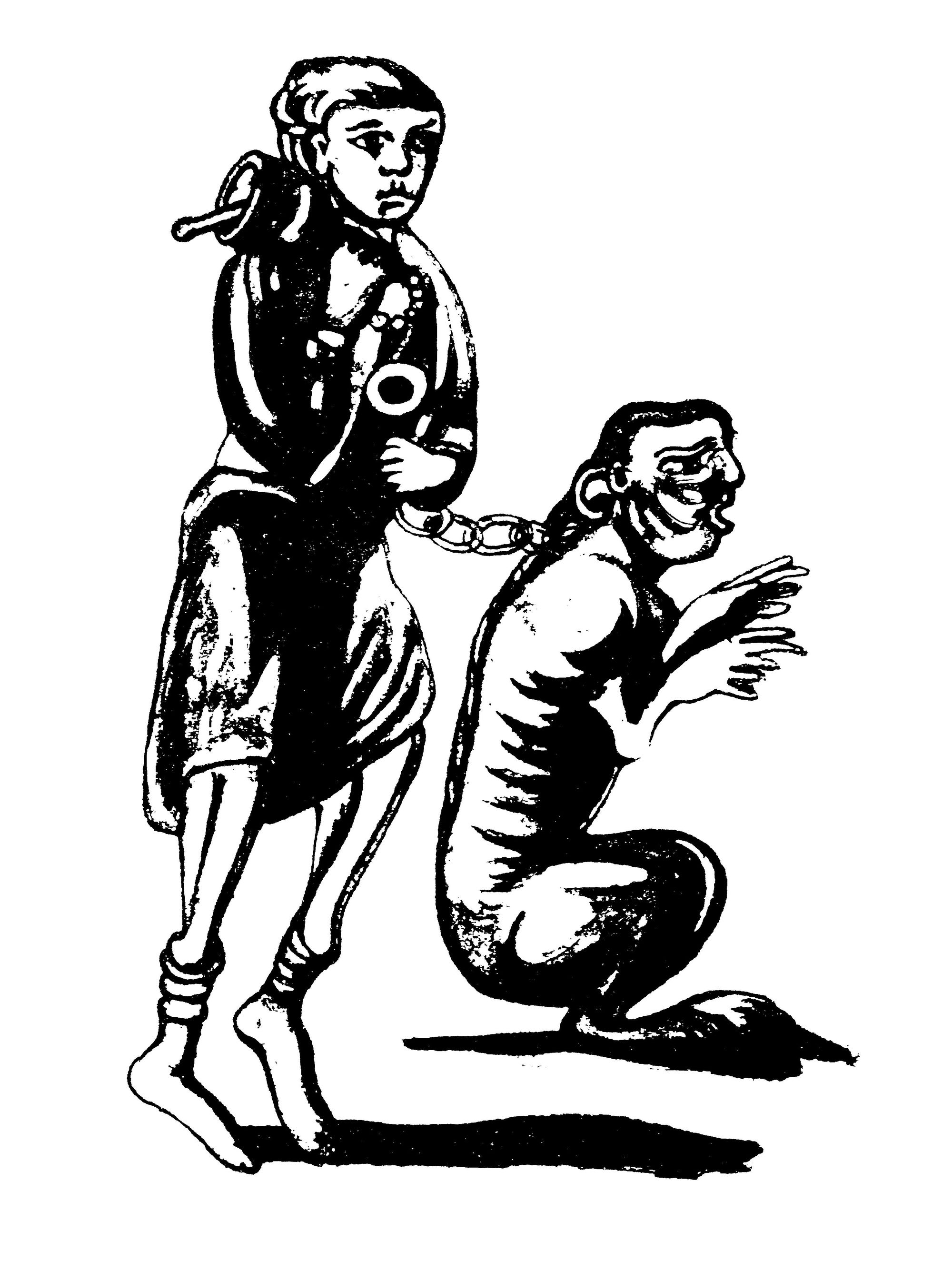
The myth of the changeling was once used to justify the abandonment of autistic babies and children.

Autistic individuals have historically been victims of infanticide. As noted by Lorna Wing and others, the myth of the changeling, present in various cultures, may have contributed to the murder or abandonment of autistic infants and children. The belief that a biological child had been replaced by a supernatural being (such as a fairy, goblin, or demon) allowed some parents to justify the removal of children they perceived as strange or emotionally distant. During the rise of eugenics and Nazism in the 1930s and 1940s, many disabled individuals killed under the Aktion T4 program were likely autistic. It is estimated that approximately 3,500 autistic individuals may have been killed in this context.

No comprehensive statistics exist on the murder or deliberate abandonment of autistic individuals today, but such incidents are frequently reported by media and advocacy groups. The Autistic Self Advocacy Network documented 36 cases involving disabled individuals, predominantly autistic, in 2012. American activist Kathleen Seidel maintained a record of murdered autistic individuals on her blog. Josef Schovanec estimates that approximately 100 autistic individuals are killed annually in France. Anne McGuire notes that while each murder case is treated individually, the commonly cited motive is "autism" or "life with autism."

Murders of autistic individuals are typically committed by a parent or caregiver, most often the mother. Maternal infanticide is often overlooked due to societal beliefs about maternal behavior. Anne McGuire's study of three cases found that an autism diagnosis in children with significant challenges often triggered maternal clinical depression and despair, leading to infanticide. Lower socioeconomic status is a contributing factor, as limited financial resources can restrict access to adequate support for disabled children.

=== Suicides and euthanasia ===
Autistic individuals, both children and adults, exhibit a significantly higher suicide rate compared to the general population. According to a 2018 review by Hedley and Uljarević covering 13 studies, 1% to 35% of autistic individuals had attempted suicide at least once, while 11% to 66% had experienced suicidal thoughts. Additionally, 0.31% of early deaths among autistic individuals are attributed to suicide, a rate notably higher than in the general population.

Suicide is more prevalent among autistic individuals who are not intellectually disabled than those who are and is often linked to other psychiatric conditions, particularly depression. The suicide rate for autistic individuals with no learning disabilities is approximately nine times higher than the general population, making it their second leading cause of death after heart disease. Additionally, 14% of autistic children and adolescents experience suicidal thoughts, a rate 28 times higher than their non-autistic peers.

A 2014 literature review found that 10.5% to 50% of autistic individuals experienced suicidal thoughts or had attempted suicide. A study by Sarah Cassidy and Simon Baron-Cohen involving 374 adults with Asperger syndrome (a since-defunct autism subtype) reported that 66% had suicidal thoughts, with one-third having planned or attempted suicide, and 31% experienced depression, compared to 17% with suicidal thoughts in the general British population. A 2018 study of 185 autistic individuals, including 92 women, found that 49% met the criteria for depression (more prevalent among women) and 36% had suicidal thoughts. Suicide risk was not correlated with the severity of autistic symptoms but was significantly associated with loneliness, lack of social support, and comorbid psychiatric disorders. Depression screening tools designed for the general population may be unsuitable for autistic individuals.

In Belgium and the Netherlands, some autistic adults have sought euthanasia. A notable case in Belgium sparked controversy in 2016. A study of 100 euthanasia requests in Belgium from 2007 to 2011 found that 12% were made by autistic individuals.

== Causes ==
Determining the primary cause of death for autistic individuals is challenging due to imprecise studies that often fail to identify exact causes. Complex interactions, such as child abuse, economic conditions, and environmental factors, may contribute to mortality. Autistic individuals face greater socio-economic risks compared to non-autistic populations, yet most medical databases lack information on patients' socio-economic status.

Mortality factors for autistic individuals are similar to those in the general population, except epilepsy, which has a significantly higher incidence. These health issues occur more frequently across the lifespan of autistic individuals.

Unlike non-autistic individuals with attention deficit hyperactivity disorder (ADHD), whose deaths are primarily linked to accidents and risky behaviors, autistic individuals commonly die from both natural causes (e.g., diseases) and artificial causes (e.g., accidents). Common causes include heart and circulatory diseases, respiratory conditions like pneumonia and asthma, neoplasms (cancer), encephalopathies, nephrotic syndrome, and self-inflicted injuries such as head trauma. Intellectual disability is a risk factor for early mortality. Deaths have also been reported due to nervous system disorders, complications from neuroleptic medications, and medication overdoses. Mortality related to alcohol, tobacco, and drug use is lower among autistic individuals compared to non-autistic peers.

A scientific literature review by Magali Segers identifies key risk factors for suicide among autistic individuals, in order of significance: peer discrimination, behavioral problems, being part of an ethnic minority (Black or Hispanic) in the United States, being male, lower socio-economic status, and low educational attainment. As of 2017, the mechanisms driving suicide in autistic individuals remain poorly understood and may differ from those in non-autistic populations, as suicidal ideation is more prevalent than depression, and gender-related patterns also vary. Difficulty in expressing thoughts and feelings is a significant risk factor. The stress from mental health disorders and high suicide rates in autistic individuals may be linked to minority stigmatization. The review suggests that autism and mental health issues are not inherently connected, and anti-discrimination measures could reduce these risks.

The precise contributions of biological and social factors to mortality among autistic individuals remain unclear, with emotional well-being potentially playing a significant role. Autistic individuals often exhibit lower physical activity levels, less varied diets, and more frequent use of medications, particularly neuroleptics, compared to non-autistic individuals.

=== Medical comorbidities ===
Comorbidities associated with ASD are the primary medical cause of death among autistic individuals. Genetic disorders that often co-occur with autism contribute to physical vulnerabilities. Sudden illnesses, particularly cardiac events or other diseases, are the leading cause of death among autistic individuals with no learning disabilities. Autistic individuals also have a higher incidence of gastrointestinal and digestive disorders, muscular and sensory issues, and increased susceptibility to infectious diseases. A study of 1,507 autistic adults in California found that "almost all medical problems were significantly more common among autistic adults, including immune conditions, gastrointestinal and sleep disorders, seizures, obesity, dyslipidemia, high blood pressure, and diabetes. More serious conditions, such as strokes and Parkinson's disease, were also much more frequent."

==== Epilepsy ====
Instructions for assisting someone having an epileptic seizure (video in Spanish).

Approximately one-third of autistic individuals have epilepsy, resulting in a significantly higher prevalence of epileptic seizures in this population. A 2000 study by K. Patja and colleagues in Finland found that mortality rates among epileptic individuals with intellectual disabilities were significantly higher than among non-epileptic individuals with similar intellectual disabilities.

Autistic individuals with epilepsy face a higher mortality risk compared to non-epileptic autistic individuals, with life expectancy for those without intellectual disability but with epilepsy estimated at 39 years, and a mortality rate 8.3 times higher than non-epileptic autistic individuals. A 2012 scientific literature review concluded that the link between epilepsy and autism has significant health implications.

==== Psychiatric comorbidities ====
Approximately 70% of autistic individuals have at least one psychiatric comorbidity, with 41% having two or more. Social anxiety is the most common, followed by ADHD and various forms of anxiety, particularly among those without intellectual disability. Digby Tantam notes that morbidity related to substance misuse (drugs, medication, alcohol, etc.) is common among people with ADHD. Autistic individuals frequently experience sensory overload throughout their lives.

Anxiety among autistic individuals may contribute to drug and alcohol use, negatively impacting health. Chronic anxiety is also associated with deteriorating arterial health. However, no evidence links anxiety directly to suicide risk in this population.

=== Changes in lifestyle habits ===
Autonomous autistic individuals are likely to encounter the same major life changes as non-autistic individuals, such as the death of a loved one, children leaving home, career transitions, relationship dissatisfaction, physical aging, and the development of chronic health conditions. However, these changes may be more challenging for them to manage. Environmental changes, such as placement in an institution, can result in the accumulation of negative experiences and emotions, with adverse effects on health. Likewise, "for the autistic person, a hierarchical promotion can be disastrous, potentially leading to suicide attempts: a promotion can distance the person from the work they enjoyed, assigning them human management tasks that may be very different."

Autistic individuals may experience comorbid health conditions, such as diabetes and cardiovascular diseases, which can necessitate support from family members. The aging of parents is considered a significant factor in mortality among some autistic individuals, as parents may eventually become unable to provide necessary care. There are no available statistical data to quantify the extent of this issue, which may primarily affect men who have not been institutionalized and who experience a decline shortly after the death of their parents. Several cases have been reported in which autonomous autistic individuals had to acquire basic life skills following the loss of their parents; however, not all possess the capacity or willingness to do so, particularly at an advanced age.

To address this issue, relatives may designate a person or institution to care for the autistic individual after their death. However, finding a solution can be challenging, as other family members may not have a sufficiently close relationship with the individual to assume this responsibility.

=== Social exclusion ===
Autistic individuals may experience significant social and cultural pressures, including bullying in educational or professional settings, pressure to conform by masking difficulties, and social isolation. While suicidal tendencies among autistic individuals previously diagnosed with Asperger syndrome may be associated with depression and comorbid conditions, Simon Baron-Cohen highlights the impact of social exclusion, isolation, and loneliness faced by autistic adults. School bullying can contribute to suicidal ideation in children and adolescents, often leading to self-critical attitudes and negative perceptions of others, stemming from rejection and repeated mockery. The role of peer discrimination in increasing suicide risk has been confirmed.

Autistic individuals often lack protective factors against suicide, including a strong social network, peer social skills, and overall life satisfaction. Communication difficulties and limited social interactions significantly reduce the likelihood of receiving support when experiencing suicidal thoughts.

=== Pain ===
Pain in autistic individuals is considered particularly difficult to assess and manage. The use of neuroleptic medications may increase the risk that pain is neither perceived nor expressed, thereby limiting its function as a warning sign of potential health issues. Several studies conclude that this situation "contributes to increased mortality linked to somatic pathologies in these so-called vulnerable populations, particularly among adults with ASD;" in addition, pain may be perceived in atypical ways.

=== Accidents ===
Accidents represent a significant cause of mortality among autistic children and young adults. A study by Joseph Guan and Guohua Li, based on data from 1,367 deceased autistic individuals in the United States, found that the proportion of accidental deaths is notably higher in the autistic population compared to the general population. The average age at death was 36.2 years, considerably lower than the general population average of 72 years. Among the causes of death, 27.9% were due to injuries, with suffocation being the most common, followed by asphyxia and drowning.

The increased risk of drowning among autistic individuals has been confirmed by two additional studies. Road accidents also represent a common cause of mortality, particularly among those who drive and have comorbid ADHD.

=== Culture of murder ===
The murder of autistic individuals with highly intensive daily support needs has been linked to a "culture of murder" shaped by notions of mercy. Perpetrators often justify their actions by emphasizing the perceived severity of the individual's autism and lifelong dependency, describing the act as "necessary" and the condition as "hopeless." Media coverage of such cases tends to focus on the perpetrator's motives and the narrative of mercy, generating public sympathy for the offender. The rights of the autistic victim are rarely highlighted. This framing can contribute to the minimization of these acts in public discourse and, in some cases, may influence judicial outcomes, including acquittals.

In some English-speaking countries, this situation is reportedly reinforced by works of popular culture in which a character exhibiting traits associated with autism, such as in Of Mice and Men or Flowers for Algernon, requests or receives a mercy killing. Such portrayals may contribute to the persistence of a "culture of murder" that adversely affects public perceptions of autistic individuals. In 1996, a French court acquitted a mother who had killed her autistic child. Following the verdict, the rapporteur of the Chossy Law stated: "Everyone will understand that when one is alone and desperate, sometimes the death of a loved one appears as the gentlest solution. But I want to assert that when there is no longer hope, hope remains."

== Prevention ==
The study conducted by Tatja Hirvikoski and colleagues recommends, as a primary measure, the promotion of autism-related knowledge within the medical field. However, in practice, few initiatives specifically target the prevention of premature deaths among autistic individuals.

Existing prevention efforts primarily address immediate causes of mortality, such as epilepsy, accidents, and sudden death. The specific characteristics of autism can contribute to delays and complications in the treatment of somatic illnesses, potentially leading to fatal outcomes if care is not provided promptly. Access to healthcare is generally more limited for autistic individuals compared to non-autistic peers. In France, for example, "there is a significant delay in the provision of somatic care in hospitals, particularly in the field of dental care, due to the small number of specialized services or facilities ready to accommodate people with autism."

Parents and other individuals who interact regularly with non-speaking autistic individuals are generally considered the most capable of detecting health-related issues. It has been proposed that autistic individuals be provided with improved means of communicating symptoms, such as visual tools like pictograms. Further research on the adult autistic population is also recommended. The British organization, Autistica, advocates for increased study of depression and anxiety within the autistic population to identify suicide risk factors, as well as the promotion of physical activity, enhancement of quality of life, and inclusion of the perspectives of the autistic community.

The need for improved coordination of medical care for autistic individuals has been emphasized, notably by Dr. Djéa Saravane. He advises healthcare professionals to be attentive to signs of pain, particularly in non-speaking individuals, and to adapt care practices to the specific characteristics of autism, including sensory hypersensitivities and hyposensitivities. Medical environments are often inadequately adapted to the needs of autistic individuals. In addition, many autistic individuals respond negatively to changes in routine, including medical visits. Standard procedures, such as blood draws, may be particularly challenging with non-speaking patients.

A 2014 study published in The Lancet recommended that healthcare professionals working with autistic individuals previously diagnosed with Asperger syndrome remain particularly vigilant regarding the elevated risk of suicide, which has historically been underestimated. The study also advised that households with a swimming pool ensure it is entirely inaccessible to autistic children who cannot swim, and that swimming instruction be provided as early as possible.

== Commitments ==
We cannot tolerate a situation where so many autistic people will never see their fortieth birthday.

— Jon Spiers, CEO of Autistica

Associations and key figures within the autism rights movement have engaged in efforts to reduce mortality among autistic individuals. This form of activism is particularly noted in English-speaking countries. In contrast, such initiatives are less common in France, where, according to Josef Schovanec, "associations related to autism and the individuals themselves typically do not get involved."

On the website Autistics.org, American activist Laura Tisoncik launched an extended online campaign to denounce the murder of autistic individuals and the way such cases are portrayed in the media. This form of activism may contrast with that of certain autism-related organizations, particularly parent associations. In the case of Danielle Blais, Ari Ne'eman and Michelle Dawson criticized the Autism Society of Montreal for supporting a mother who drowned her six-year-old autistic son by organizing a fundraiser and providing testimony in her defense.

On February 26, 2003, David Vardy, the Newfoundland representative for the Canadian Autism Society, stated before the Canadian Senate that "autism is worse than cancer in many ways, because the person with autism has a normal lifespan. The problem is with you for a lifetime." This statement was also condemned by Dawson and Ne'eman. In France, Josef Schovanec refers in his book Nos intelligences multiples to the murder of autistic individuals "killed for being autistic" as "auticide."

A deeply unsettling and little-studied social phenomenon is that of autistic individuals killed for being autistic, which could be termed 'auticide' [...]. A remarkable and specific fact, however, is that auticides are downplayed by public opinion.

— Josef Schovanec, Nos intelligences multiples

The Swedish study published in late 2015 received considerable media coverage. Cited by the British association Autistica in a report, it highlighted what English-speaking media referred to as a "hidden crisis." In response, Autistica called for the implementation of a national plan to prevent premature deaths among autistic individuals in the United Kingdom.

On May 24, 2017, British psychiatrists Sarah Cassidy and Jacqui Rodgers published a letter in The Lancet announcing the launch of coordinated efforts addressing this issue. In the days that followed, researchers from Coventry and Newcastle universities, in collaboration with Autistica and the James Lind Alliance, organized the first international conference focused on suicide among autistic individuals.

Steve Silberman, author of NeuroTribes, described the levels of premature death among autistic individuals as "shocking," stating that "as a society, we can no longer waste precious human potential in this way."

== See also ==
- Sex and gender differences in autism
- Ableism
- Sanism
- Conditions comorbid to autism
- Suicide among autistic individuals

== Bibliography ==
=== Scientific publications ===
- Bilder, Deborah; Botts, Elizabeth; Smith, Ken; Pimentel, Richard (2013). "Excess Mortality and Causes of Death in Autism Spectrum Disorders: A Follow up of the 1980s Utah/UCLA Autism Epidemiologic Study". Journal of Autism and Developmental Disorders. 43 (5): 1196–1204. doi:10.1007/s10803-012-1664-z. ISSN 0162-3257. PMC 4814267. PMID 23008058.
- Catalá-López, Ferrán; Hutton, Brian; Page, Matthew; Driver, Jane (2022). "Mortality in Persons With Autism Spectrum Disorder or Attention-Deficit/Hyperactivity Disorder: A Systematic Review and Meta-analysis". JAMA Pediatrics. 176 (4): e216401. doi:10.1001/jamapediatrics.2021.6401. hdl:2117/364552. ISSN 2168-6203. PMC 8845021. PMID 35157020.
- Croen, Lisa; Zerbo, Ousseny; Qian, Yinge; Massolo, Maria (2015). "The health status of adults on the autism spectrum". Autism. 19 (7): 814–82. doi:10.1177/1362361315577517. ISSN 1362-3613. PMID 25911091.
- Gillberg, Christopher; Billstedt, Eva; Sundh, Valter; Gillberg, Carina (2010). "Mortality in Autism: A Prospective Longitudinal Community-Based Study". Journal of Autism and Developmental Disorders. 40 (3): 352–357. doi:10.1007/s10803-009-0883-4. ISSN 0162-3257. PMID 19838782.
- Guan, Joseph; Li, Guohua (2017). "Injury Mortality in Individuals With Autism". American Journal of Public Health. 107 (5): 791–793. doi:10.2105/ajph.2017.303696. ISSN 0090-0036. PMC 5388960. PMID 28323463.
- Hedley, Darren; Uljarević, Mirko (2018). "Systematic Review of Suicide in Autism Spectrum Disorder: Current Trends and Implications". Current Developmental Disorders Reports. 5 (1): 65–76. doi:10.1007/s40474-018-0133-6. ISSN 2196-2987.
- Lai, Meng-Chuan; Saunders, Natasha; Huang, Anjie; Artani, Azmina (2023). "Self-Harm Events and Suicide Deaths Among Autistic Individuals in Ontario, Canada". JAMA Network Open. 6 (8): e2327415. doi:10.1001/jamanetworkopen.2023.27415. ISSN 2574-3805. PMC 10410481. PMID 37552480.
- Hirvikoski, Tatja; Mittendorfer-Rutz, Ellenor; Boman, Marcus; Larsson, Henrik (2016). "Premature mortality in autism spectrum disorder". The British Journal of Psychiatry. 208 (3): 232–238. doi:10.1192/bjp.bp.114.160192. ISSN 0007-1250. PMID 26541693.
- Isager, Torben; Mouridsen, Svend; Rich, Bente (1999). "Mortality and Causes of Death in Pervasive Developmental Disorders". Autism. 3 (1): 7–16. doi:10.1177/1362361399003001002. ISSN 1362-3613.
- Mouridsen, Svend Erik; Brønnum-Hansen, Henrik; Rich, Bente; Isager, Torben (2008). "Mortality and causes of death in autism spectrum disorders: An update". Autism. 12 (4): 403–414. doi:10.1177/1362361308091653. ISSN 1362-3613. PMID 18579647.
- Shavelle, Robert; Strauss, David (1998). "Comparative mortality of persons with autism in California, 1989-1996". Journal of Insurance Medicine. 30 (4): 220–225. ISSN 0743-6661. PMID 10537926.
- Shavelle, Robert; Strauss, David; Pickett, Jane (2001). "Causes of Death in Autism". Journal of Autism and Developmental Disorders. 31 (6): 569–576. doi:10.1023/A:1013247011483. ISSN 0162-3257. PMID 11814268.
- Vu, Hien; Bowden, Nicholas; Gibb, Sheree; Audas, Richard (2024). "Mortality risk among Autistic children and young people: A nationwide birth cohort study". Autism. 28 (9): 2244–2253. doi:10.1177/13623613231224015. ISSN 1362-3613. PMC 11395172. PMID 38311609.

=== Works ===
- Freeman Loftis, Sonya (2015). "The Autistic Victim: Of Mices and Men and Flowers for Algernon". Imagining Autism: Fiction and Stereotypes on the Spectrum. Indiana University Press. ISBN 978-0-253-01813-7.
- McGuire, Anne (2016). War on Autism: On the Cultural Logic of Normative Violence. Corporealities: Discourses Of Disability. University of Michigan Press. ISBN 978-0-472-05312-4.
- Mouridsen, Svend Erik (2011). "Is mortality increased in individuals with ASD?". Autism Spectrum Conditions: FAQs on Autism, Asperger Syndrome, and Atypical Autism Answered by International Experts. Hogrefe Publishing. pp. 90–91. ISBN 978-1-61676-393-0.
- Patel, Dilip; Greydanus, Donald (2012). "Mortality". Autism Spectrum Disorders: Practical Overview For Pediatricians, An Issue of Pediatric Clinics. Elsevier Health Sciences. ISBN 978-1-4557-4302-5.
- Volkmar, Fred R; Paul, Rhea; Klin, Ami; Cohen, Donald (2005). "Mortality". Handbook of Autism and Pervasive Developmental Disorders, Diagnosis, Development, Neurobiology, and Behavior. Vol. 1. John Wiley & Sons. pp. 296–297. ISBN 0-471-72110-7.
- Volkmar, Fred; Reichow, Brian; McPartland, James (2014). Adolescents and Adults with Autism Spectrum Disorders. Springer Science & Business. ISBN 978-1-4939-0506-5.
- Wright, Scott (2016). Autism Spectrum Disorder in Mid and Later Life. Jessica Kingsley Publishers. ISBN 978-1-78450-037-5.
