= Suicide among autistic individuals =

Social issue

Suicide among autistic individuals is a notable trend regarding the mortality rate of people with autism. It has been the subject of increasing scientific research, particularly since the late 2010s. Studies have identified a significantly higher prevalence of suicidal ideation and suicide attempts in this population, affecting both minors and adults, including through requests for assisted suicide. The suicide mortality rate among autistic individuals is estimated to be three to seven times higher than that of the general population, with variations across countries.

The underlying causes of this increased risk are still the subject of academic and medical review. Survivor accounts frequently reference feelings of being perceived as a burden, internal conflict related to autism, psychological trauma, and fatigue associated with masking autistic traits in social contexts. Additional risk factors include experiences of bullying, delayed diagnosis, and high intellectual ability. These risks are often under-recognized by clinicians and family members. The high number of assisted suicide requests by autistic individuals, particularly in countries like Belgium and the Netherlands, has prompted debate regarding the adequacy of social and healthcare support systems for autistic people.

Evidence suggests that fostering self-esteem and improving autistic individuals’ social inclusion can contribute to reducing suicide risk within the population.

== Statistics and facts ==
The suicide rate among autistic individuals is widely recognized as significantly higher than in the general population, and is considered one of the leading causes of death within this group. Reported rates vary depending on the methodology used and the country in which the research is conducted. Part of this variability stems from differences in the measurement tools employed, particularly those that do not differentiate between suicide attempts and non-suicidal self-injurious behavior.

Several studies conducted between 2014 and 2017, particularly in the United Kingdom, reported suicide rates approximately six times higher among autistic individuals compared to the general population. A 2016 Swedish study found the rate to be 7.5 times higher.

According to a 2017 report by the National Institute of Public Health of Quebec, the suicide rate among autistic youth under the age of 24 was twice that of their non-autistic peers. A similarly elevated rate was observed in Utah among autistic youth between 2013 and 2017. A controlled study in Taiwan involving 5,218 autistic adolescents reported a suicide attempt rate of 3.9%, compared to 0.7% in the control group.

A Danish cohort study involving over 6.5 million individuals over a 10-year period concluded that individuals diagnosed with autism spectrum disorder (ASD) have a risk of suicide attempts and suicide more than three times higher than the general population. Within the cohort, 35,020 individuals had a confirmed ASD diagnosis; among them, 587 (0.9%) attempted suicide, and 53 died by suicide.

Similar rates were observed among individuals exhibiting autistic traits but without a formal diagnosis. In England, a separate analysis of individuals who died by suicide found a significant overrepresentation of autistic characteristics.

=== Rates of suicidal ideation ===
A 2023 systematic review and meta-analysis conducted by Victoria Newell and collaborators found that suicidal ideation affects 34.2% of autistic and presumed autistic individuals without intellectual disabilities. Suicide attempts and behaviors were observed in 24.3% of this population, significantly higher than the general population, in which transnational estimates place suicidal ideation at approximately 9%, with 2–3% reporting suicide plans or attempts.

A separate meta-analysis published in 2022 by O'Halloran et al. found that about one-quarter of all autistic individuals experience suicidal ideation and approximately one in ten have attempted suicide during their lifetime.

The prevalence of suicidal ideation varies by region. Reported rates are lower in several Asian countries, including South Korea, Taiwan, China, Singapore, and Japan, compared to Europe and Oceania. This lower prevalence may not reflect actual trends. It could be influenced by factors such as legal penalties for suicide, cultural emphasis on family honor, and greater stigma surrounding autism and mental health.

=== Gender ratio ===
A 2014 systematic review by Segers and Rawana initially found higher suicide rates among autistic men compared to women. However, subsequent cohort studies conducted in Denmark, Sweden, Ontario (Canada), and Utah (United States) reported that suicidal ideation and suicide attempt rates are consistently higher among autistic women and girls than among their male counterparts. This trend contrasts with patterns observed in the general population, where men typically exhibit higher rates of suicide completion than women.

A 2023 systematic review identified autistic women without intellectual disabilities as a population at particularly high risk. However, it found limited confirmation of earlier findings suggesting that suicidality is more frequent among autistic women. Most of the studies included in this review had a majority of female participants. The elevated suicide risk in this population may be linked to challenges in diagnosis, often resulting in delayed or missed identification of autism in women.

=== Age group trends ===
In the Danish cohort, suicide rates were higher than in the general population across all age groups beginning at age 10. The highest suicide rate was recorded among individuals aged 30 to 39.

The 2023 meta-analysis noted a lack of comprehensive research on suicide rates by age group but suggested that rates tend to be higher among adults than among youth, especially from age 20 onward. These rates remain elevated in older adults, who exhibit suicidal ideation at rates five to six times higher than in the general population.

=== Methods of suicide ===
According to data from the Utah cohort, autistic individuals are less likely than non-autistic individuals to die by firearm-related suicide, but show no significant differences in the overall selection of suicide methods. There is also no notable distinction between men and women in the techniques used. Approximately 73% of suicides involve violent means. Non-violent methods typically include asphyxiation and poisoning.

In a Finnish cohort study of autistic individuals with moderate to severe intellectual disabilities, recorded suicide methods included hanging, drowning, poisoning (via a laced cigarette or medication ingestion), and suicide by train—either by lying on the tracks or jumping in front of a moving train.

=== Limitations of research ===
Most studies on suicide and autism are conducted in high-income countries, even though global suicide rates tend to be higher in low- and middle-income regions. Additionally, there is a notable lack of research focused on autistic individuals with intellectual disabilities. Another methodological limitation concerns the frequent failure to distinguish between passive suicidal ideation (a wish to be dead) and active suicidal ideation (an intention to end one's life), which may affect the accuracy of reported prevalence rates.

== History of studies ==
The issue of suicidality among autistic individuals began receiving public attention in the early 2010s. On November 17, 2010, Lynne Soraya, a parent of a suicidal autistic child, published a blog post on Psychology Today highlighting the severe lack of resources and data on the subject. In a follow-up post two and a half years later, she noted the initiation of a pioneering study involving 791 American children, which found that suicidal ideation occurred 28 times more frequently among autistic children than in a control group.

A 2014 systematic review by Magali Segers and Jennine Rawana underlined the scarcity of research dedicated specifically to suicide within the autistic population, despite a broader literature on suicidality in the general population. Their review identified only ten studies that quantified the proportion of autistic individuals in suicidal populations, which ranged from 7.3% to 15%. Also in 2014, Italian neurologist and pediatrician Michele Raja, drawing on preliminary findings from a British study led by Dr. Sarah Cassidy, published an editorial in The Lancet urging healthcare professionals to recognize the elevated suicide risk in autistic individuals, particularly those historically diagnosed with Asperger syndrome. (Note: The diagnosis of Asperger syndrome has no longer existed since the release of the ICD-11 in 2020.) This appeal contributed to the inclusion of suicide prevention as a dedicated research theme supported for four years by the International Society for Autism Research (INSAR), incorporating participatory research methodologies that involved autistic individuals directly in the research process.

As of 2018, few scientific studies had specifically addressed the suicide risk among autistic individuals. Subsequent research has found that autistic traits are more prevalent among adults who have attempted suicide than in the general population. These traits are also more pronounced in individuals with multiple suicide attempts compared to those with only one attempt.

In 2020, journalist and autism rights advocate Sara Luterman criticized the disparity in research funding between basic and applied autism studies. She highlighted the allocation of significant resources to studies involving genetically modified animals while comparatively little funding was directed toward understanding the high suicide rate among autistic adults. In February 2025, Brittany N. Hand and colleagues drew attention to common misinterpretations in the communication of scientific findings related to autism and mortality. They particularly criticized how the study by Hirkivoski et al. was presented in high-impact journals and mainstream media, which claimed that being autistic reduced life expectancy by 16 to 18 years without adequately contextualizing the role of suicide. This miscommunication reportedly had negative consequences for autistic individuals, including home insurance denials, psychological distress, altered retirement planning, and increased healthcare disparities.

=== Underestimation of suicide risk ===
Collaboration between autistic individuals experiencing suicidality and healthcare professionals is considered essential for reducing mortality. Access to post-diagnostic support services also plays a critical role. However, autistic individuals frequently encounter barriers to accessing suicide prevention hotlines and mental health support services, including administrative and systemic obstacles.

In 2022, medical researcher Luke Curtis stated:

The autistic community is highly exposed to suicide risk. Much more community support, clinical attention, and quality research are needed to prevent and treat depression and suicide in children, adolescents, and adults.

— Luke Curtis

==== By healthcare professionals ====
A 2020 survey conducted by Jager-Hyman found that American physicians involved in suicide prevention reported greater difficulty identifying suicide risk in autistic patients compared to non-autistic patients. These physicians also tended to perceive non-autistic patients as being at higher risk, despite statistical evidence indicating a higher suicide risk among autistic individuals. This suggests a tendency among healthcare professionals to underestimate suicide risk within the autistic population. A 2023 survey of physicians in the northeastern United States indicated that fewer than half correctly identified autistic individuals as a high-risk group for suicide.

In a 2018 investigation published by Spectrum News, journalist Cheryl Platzman Weinstock reported that psychiatrists may overlook signs of suicidality in autistic patients due to differences in emotional expression. Common indicators of suicide risk in the general population—such as changes in sleep, appetite, or social behavior may already be present as part of the individual's baseline characteristics, complicating risk detection.

==== By parents ====
A 2023 meta-analysis indicates that rates of suicidal ideation reported by parents are consistently lower than those reported by autistic youth themselves. This discrepancy suggests that autistic individuals may be more accurate in recognizing and reporting their suicidality, while parents tend to underreport these symptoms. Studies combining self-report and informant-based methods support this observation.

=== Development of therapies and suicide prevention tools ===
Until 2020, no suicide risk assessment tool was specifically designed for the autistic population. General tools, such as the Safety Planning Intervention developed by Stanley and Brown in 2012, have been used by healthcare professionals, though they are not tailored to autistic individuals. In 2021, a research team led by Sarah Cassidy developed the Suicidal Behaviours Questionnaire—Autism Spectrum Conditions (SBQ-ASC), which, as of 2023, remains the only validated screening instrument specifically for autistic individuals. Other general tools, such as the Ask Suicide-Screening Questions (ASQ) and the Self-Injurious Thoughts and Behaviors Interview—Self Report (SITBI-SR), have also been found to apply to this population.

A multicenter study launched in 2020 is evaluating the effectiveness of dialectical behavior therapy (DBT), a treatment already proven effective for suicidal individuals with borderline personality disorder, in autistic populations.

== Risk factors ==
Some suicide risk factors specific to the autistic population differ from those observed in neurotypical individuals; however, few studies have comprehensively identified them.

The high prevalence of autistic traits among individuals with a history of suicide attempts may be explained by several hypotheses: that high autistic traits are an independent predictor of suicidality; that undiagnosed autism is more prevalent among individuals who attempt suicide; or that comorbid conditions associated with autism contribute significantly to suicide risk.

=== Recognized risk factors ===
Common risk factors for suicide across populations include depression, social isolation, and experiences of harassment. Among autistic individuals, these factors are often compounded by a heightened sense of being perceived as a burden, conflicted feelings of belonging, and a persistent sense of trauma. A review by Segers and Rawana identified additional risk factors, including lower socio-economic status, racialization, and behavioral challenges. Limited access to healthcare services and support may further exacerbate these risks. Autistic youth most at risk of suicidal ideation or attempts are often those with both the highest number of adverse life events (e.g., bullying, bereavement, theft) and the least developed coping mechanisms.

The combination of perceived burdensomeness and conflicted belonging may contribute to suicidal ideation among autistic individuals. The likelihood of acting on these thoughts may depend on an individual's tolerance of fear related to death and physical pain. A 2023 review by Annabelle M. Mournet and colleagues identified interpersonal constructs as the most extensively studied and strongly evidenced contributors to suicide risk, followed by depressive symptoms.

=== Mental health, harassment, and sexual violence ===
Poor mental health is strongly associated with increased suicide risk. Data from the Ontario cohort identified mood disorders, anxiety, schizophrenia, and personality disorders as contributing factors. The Danish cohort further emphasized the roles of anxiety and seasonal affective disorders. Depression is a particularly prevalent risk factor, affecting autistic individuals at a rate approximately four times higher than that of the general population. Anxiety affects an estimated 40% of autistic children and 60% of autistic adults, with higher prevalence among women.

Social stigma and discrimination experienced by autistic individuals negatively impact mental health. Earlier misconceptions attributed poor mental health outcomes to autism itself; however, since the 2010s, studies have demonstrated that mental health issues—particularly anxiety and depression—are largely the result of minority stress and adverse living conditions. It is estimated that between 70% and 80% of autistic individuals have at least one co-occurring mental health condition.

Bullying has been identified as a contributing factor to suicidal ideation since at least 2013, and this link has been confirmed by subsequent research. High rates of sexual violence, particularly among autistic women, also contribute to elevated suicide risk. Among youth, social isolation and depression—both often related to bullying—are additional contributing factors.

==== Camouflaging ====
Camouflaging, also referred to as masking, is recognized as a suicide risk factor specific to the autistic population. This coping strategy involves consciously suppressing or altering autistic behaviors to conform to social norms, to facilitate social interaction, and avoid discrimination. It is particularly prevalent among autistic women, who often report experiencing psychological distress and suicidal ideation related to the sustained effort required to mask their traits in public.

Researchers such as South et al. have questioned the expectation that autistic individuals must camouflage behaviors—such as making eye contact despite discomfort to meet societal norms. Studies indicate that camouflaging is associated with adverse mental health outcomes, including heightened risk of suicidal thoughts and behaviors.

A 2020 online study, in which the majority of participants were women aged 20 to 23, found a correlation between camouflaging, thwarted belonging, and suicide risk. These findings were reinforced by a 2023 study that identified camouflaging as a significant transdiagnostic suicide risk factor that can persist across the lifespan.

==== Late diagnosis ====
Late diagnosis of autism, particularly in individuals without intellectual disability, has also been associated with increased suicide risk. A 2014 study by Sarah Cassidy found that individuals diagnosed later in life had a higher prevalence of suicide attempts. A 2023 review confirmed this association, though it emphasized the need for further research due to potential selection biases.

==== High intellectual potential ====
Autistic individuals without intellectual disability appear to be at higher risk for suicide than those with co-occurring intellectual disabilities. However, research on individuals with more severe disabilities remains limited, in part due to methodological barriers such as reliance on written questionnaires.

A 2023 controlled study conducted by the University of Iowa on 7,000 autistic children found that those with both autism and high intellectual potential exhibited higher rates of suicidal ideation than autistic children with average IQ levels.

=== Risk factors under investigation ===
Several risk factors associated with suicidality in the general population remain underexplored within the autistic population. These include sleep disorders and eating disorders, both of which are more prevalent among autistic individuals and may contribute to increased suicide risk.

==== Education level ====
Findings on the relationship between educational attainment and suicide risk in autistic individuals differ from those observed in the general population. While a 2014 review identified low educational attainment as a risk factor for suicide mortality, a large Danish cohort study found that suicide rates among autistic individuals increased with higher levels of education. The highest rates were observed among those holding a doctoral degree (PhD). In contrast to trends in the general population, a high level of education does not appear to be a protective factor and may instead constitute a risk factor for autistic individuals. This association may be explained by increased individual pressure and greater exposure to stressors such as masking.

==== Employment ====
Autistic individuals experience higher rates of unemployment and social exclusion compared to the general population. However, employment does not appear to confer a protective effect against suicidality among autistic individuals, unlike in the general population. The Danish cohort study suggests that autistic employees may be more vulnerable to workplace discrimination, bullying, and precarious or low-paid jobs, which may increase stress and contribute to higher suicide risk.

==== Self-harm ====
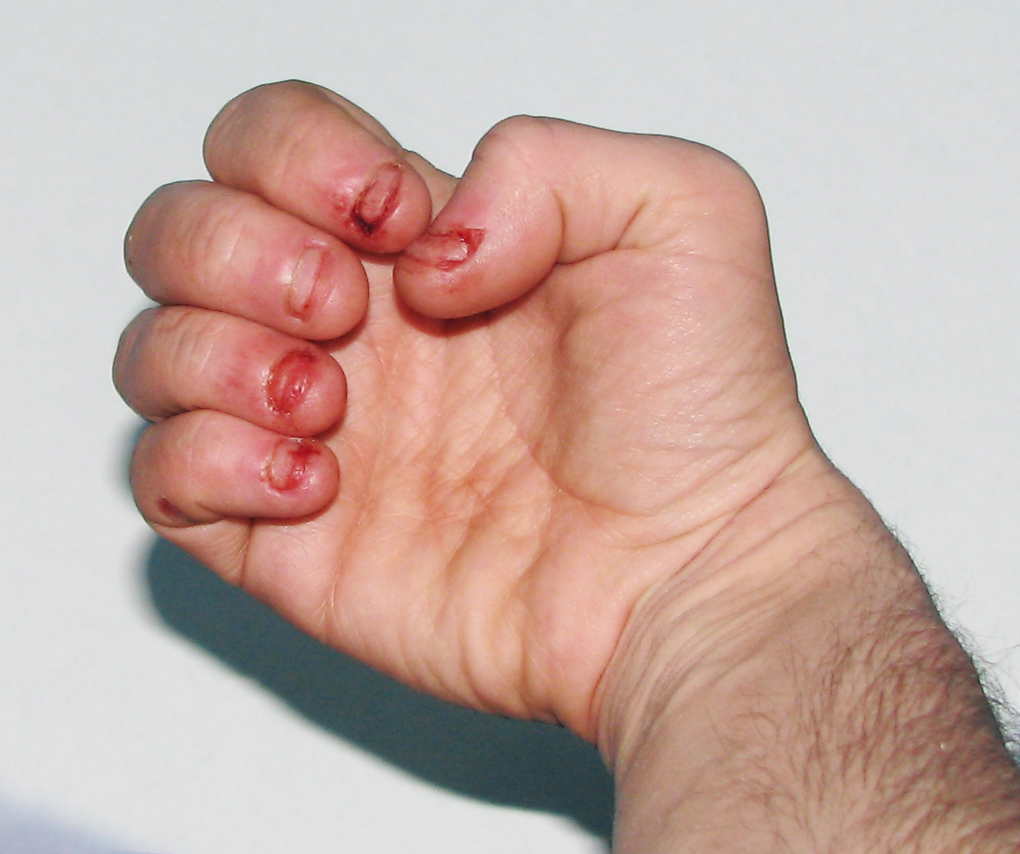
Extreme nail biting is often associated with autism spectrum disorders, as in this example.

Self-harm is recognized as a risk factor for suicide in the general population and is highly prevalent among autistic individuals. However, its role in predicting suicide risk within the autistic population remains unclear. A study involving 334 middle-school students in China found that 2.28% of those who engaged in self-harming behaviors also exhibited high levels of autistic traits, often accompanied by anxiety and rumination. Self-injurious behaviors are more frequently observed in autistic individuals with intellectual disabilities than in those without.

In clinical settings, self-harm among autistic individuals is often interpreted as a symptom of autism itself, whereas in the non-autistic population, it is more commonly associated with elevated suicide risk. Currently, no direct association has been demonstrated between self-harming behaviors and suicide risk among autistic individuals. One hypothesis suggests that self-harm may contribute to suicide risk by diminishing the fear of death or physical pain.

==== Attention Deficit Hyperactivity Disorder (ADHD) ====
A Swedish cohort study (1987–2013) identified ADHD as an additional suicide risk factor in autistic individuals. However, this finding was not corroborated by a similar Danish cohort study, indicating inconsistency in the available data.

==== Gender diversity ====
Flag combining the symbols of transidentity and neurodiversity

Gender dysphoria has been identified as a suicide risk factor in a 2022 review by O'Halloran and colleagues. This finding aligns with broader research showing that transgender and non-cisgender individuals have higher suicide rates than the general population.

Autistic individuals report higher rates of gender diversity and gender dysphoria compared to the general population. Suicidal ideation is significantly more prevalent among transgender and non-cisgender autistic individuals than among cisgender autistic individuals.

==== Sleep ====
While a significant body of research links sleep disorders to increased suicide risk in the general population, this correlation had not been specifically studied within the autistic population as of early 2025. A group of researchers identified the investigation of sleep-related issues as a top priority for future studies on the mental health of autistic adults.

=== Dismissed risk factors ===
According to data and self-reported accounts from autistic adults in Australia, the COVID-19 pandemic did not correspond with an increased suicide rate within this population. Respondents indicated that the pandemic had both positive and negative effects. Although it was occasionally associated with heightened depressive symptoms, no direct link to increased suicide risk was established.

== Protective and preventive factors ==
Protective factors commonly identified in the general population—such as older age, higher educational attainment, employment, and cohabiting with a partner have not demonstrated the same protective effects among autistic individuals. Resilience appears to be influenced by multiple factors. Some research suggests that the co-occurrence of autism and bipolar disorder may contribute to increased resilience in certain individuals. Identity formation also plays a significant role in suicide prevention. Improved outcomes are reported when family members and caregivers incorporate a neurodiversity-oriented perspective.

Enhancing quality of life and expanding access to social support networks are associated with reduced suicide risk. The promotion of self-esteem is likewise recognized as an important protective factor.

=== Contact with animals ===
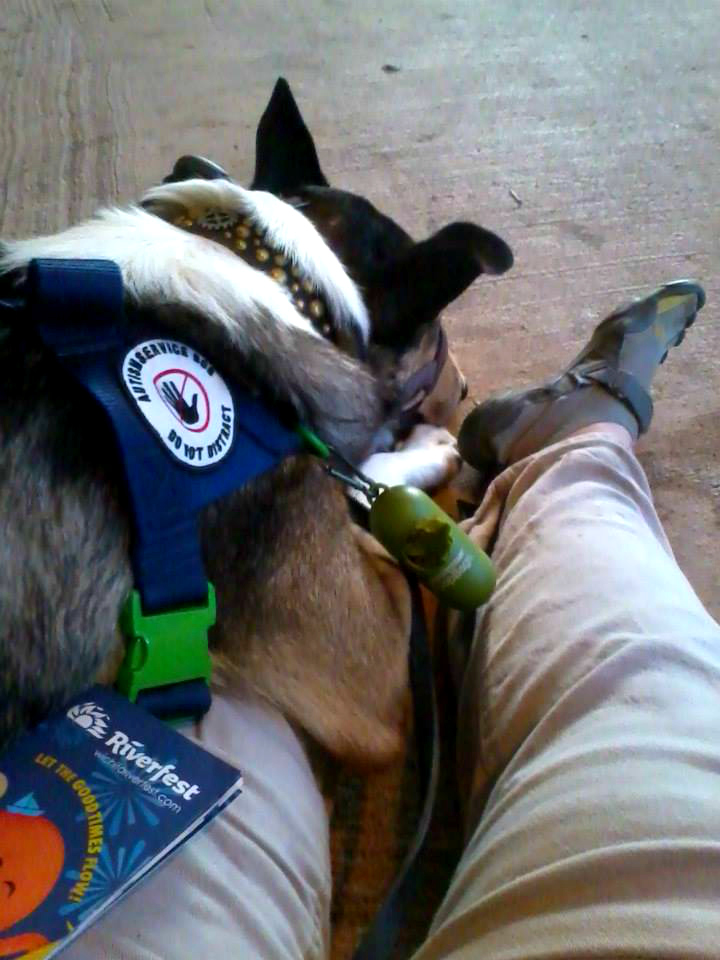
Assistance dog trained to meet the specific needs of autistic people

Animal-assisted therapies are being investigated for their potential to reduce suicide risk among autistic individuals. Research suggests that interaction with dogs may have beneficial effects. Two primary mechanisms have been proposed: the responsibility of caring for the animal may foster a sense of purpose, and the perceived unconditional affection from the dog may contribute to improved mental health and a sense of social acceptance.

A qualitative study involving interviews with 36 autistic dog owners in the United Kingdom found that regular interactions with their pets, including activities such as walking, were associated with improved mental well-being and a perceived reduction in suicide risk.

=== Social inclusion ===
Social inclusion is recognized as a key protective factor against suicide among autistic individuals. Interventions may include support for developing social skills and facilitating meaningful social connections.

Psychology researcher Annabelle Mournet has emphasized the misconception that autistic individuals lack social motivation. She argues that many autistic people seek social relationships but encounter barriers due to social rejection. She advocates for the inclusion of social support components in suicide prevention strategies targeting the autistic population.

== Public debate and publicized suicides ==
=== Ethical debate on assisted suicide ===
Legislation and judicial practice worldwide Legal assisted suicide Legalized by court order, but not legislated or regulated Illegal assisted suicide

In Belgium and the Netherlands, assisted suicide is legally permitted for individuals experiencing psychological suffering. An overrepresentation of euthanasia requests from individuals diagnosed with autism spectrum disorder—particularly women—has prompted ethical debates. Key concerns include the assessment of decision-making capacity in autistic individuals, the availability of alternative treatments, and whether autism alone constitutes sufficient grounds for assisted suicide.

Researcher Michael M. Waddell has argued that autistic individuals represent a vulnerable group at risk of "irreparable harm through premature death by assisted suicide." In the context of discussions on expanding assisted suicide eligibility in Canada to include psychological suffering, legal scholar Trudo Lemmens stated that such policies risk reinforcing "the ableist presumption that life with a chronic disability is not worth living."

Claims have circulated suggesting that global initiatives, including a purported secret decision by the World Economic Forum, are promoting assisted suicide among autistic individuals and people with disabilities. These claims are unfounded and considered misinformation.

==== Assisted suicide in the Netherlands ====
Data from the Netherlands indicate a notable proportion of euthanasia cases involving individuals diagnosed with autism spectrum disorder. Between 2011 and 2014, 19% of euthanasia requests for psychiatric conditions involved autistic individuals. From 2012 to 2021, 40 cases of euthanasia due to psychological suffering involved autistic individuals, including five under the age of 30 whose requests cited autism as the sole reason.

A qualitative analysis of nine Dutch cases found that the motivation for seeking assisted suicide was related less to the view of autism as an incurable condition and more to the ongoing challenges of living with the condition. A research team led by Irene Tuffrey-Wijne concluded that existing criteria for euthanasia in the Netherlands may not provide adequate safeguards for autistic applicants.

Commenting on these findings, Canadian professor Tim Stainton highlighted broader ethical concerns, suggesting that societal failures—including insufficient accommodations and perceptions of disability as a source of inevitable suffering—may contribute to these requests. He argued that such circumstances reflect a broader belief that "it is better to be dead than disabled," underscoring the need for improved support systems and societal inclusion.

==== Assisted suicide in Belgium ====
Between 2007 and 2012, a sample of 100 psychiatric patients who requested assisted suicide in the Flemish region of Belgium included 19 individuals diagnosed with autism spectrum disorder.

One high-profile case was that of Tine Nys, a 38-year-old woman diagnosed with Asperger syndrome. After several previous suicide attempts, her request for euthanasia was granted in 2010. The case led to extended legal proceedings and public debate concerning the interpretation of "unbearable psychological suffering" under Belgian euthanasia law, particularly in the context of autism without intellectual disability. Critics, including an autistic physician and a French autism advocacy association, argued that her suffering stemmed primarily from systemic factors such as a delayed diagnosis, social discrimination, and stigmatization of mental illness, rather than from autism itself.

=== Youth suicide associated with bullying and social rejection ===
Studies on youth suicide in the Netherlands have identified a recurring profile involving autistic boys who experience persistent social rejection. One such case is that of Cameron Warwick, an autistic and openly homosexual teenager in England, who endured prolonged bullying after coming out at the age of 12. He died by suicide in 2019 at the age of 16. Another case involved a 14-year-old boy named Daan from Waregem, Belgium, who was also autistic and reportedly subjected to bullying at school and sports clubs before taking his own life in 2023.

Testimonies from autistic women have also described prolonged experiences of school bullying, often leading to suicide attempts. These cases reflect a broader pattern in which social isolation, harassment, and lack of support contribute significantly to mental health challenges among autistic individuals.

==== Gareth Oates ====
In 2010, Gareth Oates, an 18-year-old from Stowmarket, United Kingdom, died by suicide after stepping in front of a train at Marsden Station. His case drew attention to issues surrounding school bullying and inadequate mental health support. According to his mother, Oates had experienced bullying from an early age, including being called "suicide boy" by peers, and had expressed suicidal thoughts since the age of 11. Despite warnings to Suffolk's mental health services, no effective intervention was provided. His death highlighted the lack of a dedicated national mental health support service for individuals aged 16 to 18 in the UK.

==== Caitlyn Scott-Lee ====
In April 2023, Caitlyn Scott-Lee, a 16-year-old autistic student of Chinese origin, died by suicide at Wycombe Abbey School in England. Her diary indicated that a recent disciplinary action—following an incident during a school trip to Eton College—had contributed to her distress. Her father, who is also autistic, subsequently became involved in research and advocacy related to neurodiversity and mental health.

=== Impact of living conditions ===
In Canada, the lack of appropriate housing options for autistic adults without family support has been linked to poor living conditions, including placement in substandard accommodations. These circumstances have contributed to cases of suicide. On August 16, 2013, an anonymous hate letter was sent to the parents of an autistic child in Newcastle, Ontario, urging them to euthanize their child or relocate. The incident generated significant public condemnation in Canada and internationally, highlighting persistent stigma toward autistic individuals.

In October 2018, a 21-year-old individual from Sherbrooke, Quebec, presumed to be autistic and diagnosed with depression—died by suicide after unsuccessfully seeking psychological support over 20 months. In France, a couple from Woustviller publicly discussed the difficulties they faced in securing appropriate care for their severely disabled autistic child. In August 2021, they described their situation in terms of a "well-thought-out" collective suicide, underscoring the psychological toll of systemic shortcomings in care availability. (Note: As the young autistic person had not declared a desire to die, the situation is not legally considered a collective suicide.)

In May 2022, Lindsay Bridges reported the suicide of her 20-year-old autistic daughter, which followed months of isolation and inadequate treatment in psychiatric wards in Manchester, United Kingdom.

=== Impact of medication ===
In 2015, a 13-year-old autistic boy named Yassine died after jumping from the 10th floor of a building in the Franc-Moisin neighborhood of Saint-Denis, France. Initially not classified as suicide, the case later prompted advocacy group Vaincre l'autisme to raise concerns about the prescription of Abilify (aripiprazole), a medication associated with increased suicide risk. This led the French National Agency for the Safety of Medicines and Health Products to issue a warning noting that the medication is not recommended for use in autism.

=== Associative and political responses ===
In September 2021, the United Nations issued a statement calling on France to address the elevated suicide rates among autistic individuals. In response, the French government's 2023 national strategy for individuals with neurodevelopmental conditions included measures to adapt suicide prevention helplines and support platforms to the specific needs of autistic people.

Since at least July 2021, the UK's National Autistic Society has published guidance for families and healthcare professionals regarding suicide prevention for autistic individuals.

In August 2023, the RAID police unit in Bordeaux, France, intervened to prevent the suicide of a man diagnosed with autism and schizophrenia, concluding negotiations after approximately ninety minutes.

=== Cultural representations ===
In Germany, the novel Alle Farben grau ("All the Colors Are Grey" or literally "All the Colors Grey"), published in September 2023, was inspired by the real-life case of a 16-year-old autistic teenager named Emil who died by suicide shortly after receiving a diagnosis of depression. The narrative highlights the lack of adequate support before his death, which occurred following a period of disappearance.

In 2022, during media promotion for his book Bienvenue dans mon monde ("Welcome to My World"), French game show contestant and radio commentator Paul El Kharrat publicly disclosed having experienced suicidal thoughts.

== See also ==
- Autism therapies
- Autistic masking
- Autistic rights movement
- Employment of autistic people
- Mental health inequality
- Mental health of LGBTQ people
- Suicide among LGBTQ people

== Bibliography ==
- Cassidy, Sarah; Bradley, Louise; Shaw, Rebecca; Baron-Cohen, Simon (2018). "Risk markers for suicidality in autistic adults". Molecular Autism. 9 (1): 42. doi:10.1186/s13229-018-0226-4. ISSN 2040-2392. PMC 6069847. PMID 30083306.
- O'Halloran, L; Coey, P; Wilson, C (2022). "Suicidality in autistic youth: A systematic review and meta-analysis". Clinical Psychology Review. 93 102144. doi:10.1016/j.cpr.2022.102144. ISSN 0272-7358. PMID 35290800.
- Hedley, Darren; Uljarević, Mirko (2018). "Systematic Review of Suicide in Autism Spectrum Disorder: Current Trends and Implications". Current Developmental Disorders Reports. 5 (1): 65–76. doi:10.1007/s40474-018-0133-6. ISSN 2196-2987.
- Hedley, Darren; Hayward, Susan H; Clarke, Alison; Uljarević, Mirko (2022). "Suicide and Autism: A Lifespan Perspective". End of Life and People with Intellectual and Developmental Disability: Contemporary Issues, Challenges, Experiences and Practice. Springer International Publishing. pp. 59–94. doi:10.1007/978-3-030-98697-1_3. ISBN 978-3-030-98697-1.
- Jager-Hyman, Shari; Maddox, Brenna; Crabbe, Samantha; Mandell, David (2020). "Mental Health Clinicians' Screening and Intervention Practices to Reduce Suicide Risk in Autistic Adolescents and Adults". Journal of Autism and Developmental Disorders. 50 (10): 3450–3461. doi:10.1007/s10803-020-04441-3. PMID 32240486.
- Kõlves, Kairi; Fitzgerald, Cecilie; Nordentoft, Merete; Wood, Stephen James (2021). "Assessment of Suicidal Behaviors Among Individuals With Autism Spectrum Disorder in Denmark". JAMA Network Open. 4 (1): e2033565. doi:10.1001/jamanetworkopen.2020.33565. hdl:10072/400986. ISSN 2574-3805. PMC 12578491. PMID 33433599.
- Mayes, Susan Dickerson; Gorman, Angela; Hillwig-Garcia, Jolene; Syed, Ehsan (2013). "Suicide ideation and attempts in children with autism". Research in Autism Spectrum Disorders. 7 (1): 109–119. doi:10.1016/j.rasd.2012.07.009.
- Mournet, Annabelle; Wilkinson, Ellen; Bal, Vanessa; Kleiman, Evan (2023). "A systematic review of predictors of suicidal thoughts and behaviors among autistic adults: Making the case for the role of social connection as a protective factor". Clinical Psychology Review. 99 102235. doi:10.1016/j.cpr.2022.102235. ISSN 0272-7358. PMID 36459876.
- Newell, Victoria; Phillips, Lucy; Jones, Chris; Townsend, Ellen (2023). "A systematic review and meta-analysis of suicidality in autistic and possibly autistic people without co-occurring intellectual disability". Molecular Autism. 14 (1): 12. doi:10.1186/s13229-023-00544-7. ISSN 2040-2392. PMC 10018918. PMID 36922899.
- Pelton, Mirabel; Crawford, Hayley; Robertson, Ashley; Rodgers, Jacqui (2020). "Understanding Suicide Risk in Autistic Adults: Comparing the Interpersonal Theory of Suicide in Autistic and Non-autistic Samples". Journal of Autism and Developmental Disorders. 50 (10): 3620–3637. doi:10.1007/s10803-020-04393-8. ISSN 1573-3432. PMID 32125567.
- Segers, Magali; Rawana, Jennine (2014). "What Do We Know About Suicidality in Autism Spectrum Disorders? A Systematic Review". Autism Research. 7 (4): 507–521. doi:10.1002/aur.1375. ISSN 1939-3792. PMID 24798640.
- South, Mikle; Costa, Andreia; McMorris, Carly (2021). "Death by Suicide Among People With Autism: Beyond Zebrafish". JAMA Network Open. 4 (1): e2034018. doi:10.1001/jamanetworkopen.2020.34018. ISSN 2574-3805. PMID 33433593.
