= Violence and autism =

Sociocultural issue involving autism

A popular belief is that people who suffer from autism spectrum disorder (ASD) are more likely to be violent or commit crimes than those who are non-autistic. Separately, autistic people are more likely to be victims of bullying, abuse, and other violence themselves.

== Violence against autistic people ==
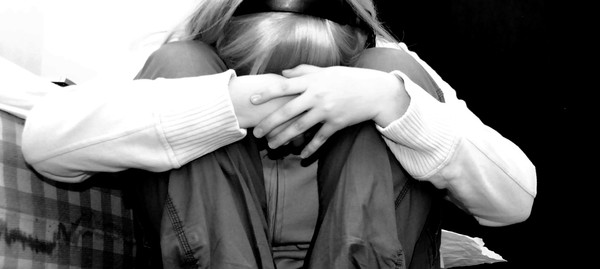
14-year-old autistic adolescent girl in sensory withdrawal (or shutdown)

Autistic individuals are often victims of violence, including bullying, abuse, sexual assault and criminal acts. Violence can be physical or verbal, as illustrated by the frequent use of the word "autistic" as an insult. Autistic people, like many disabled people, are often victims of hate crimes, and many live in fear.

A 2003 study found that children diagnosed with Asperger syndrome (a since-defunct autism subtype) were more likely to be victims of violence than tormentors. Violence against non-speaking autistic people is also facilitated by the fact that they are unable to talk about it and report it: in general, the more a person is considered to be "in a weak situation", or as a "severe" case, the more vulnerable they are to violence and social exclusion. Dependence is an aggravating factor, especially if daily assistance is required for everyday activities such as meals and washing. The "seriousness" of the "disability" can thus be invoked to justify all types of violence, including murder.

=== In schools ===
Bullying is "the most common form of violence among children and adolescents", according to Park, et al. (2020). Autistic students are victims more often than other students; the prevalence of being victimized is higher than being a perpetrator of bullying.

=== In the family environment ===
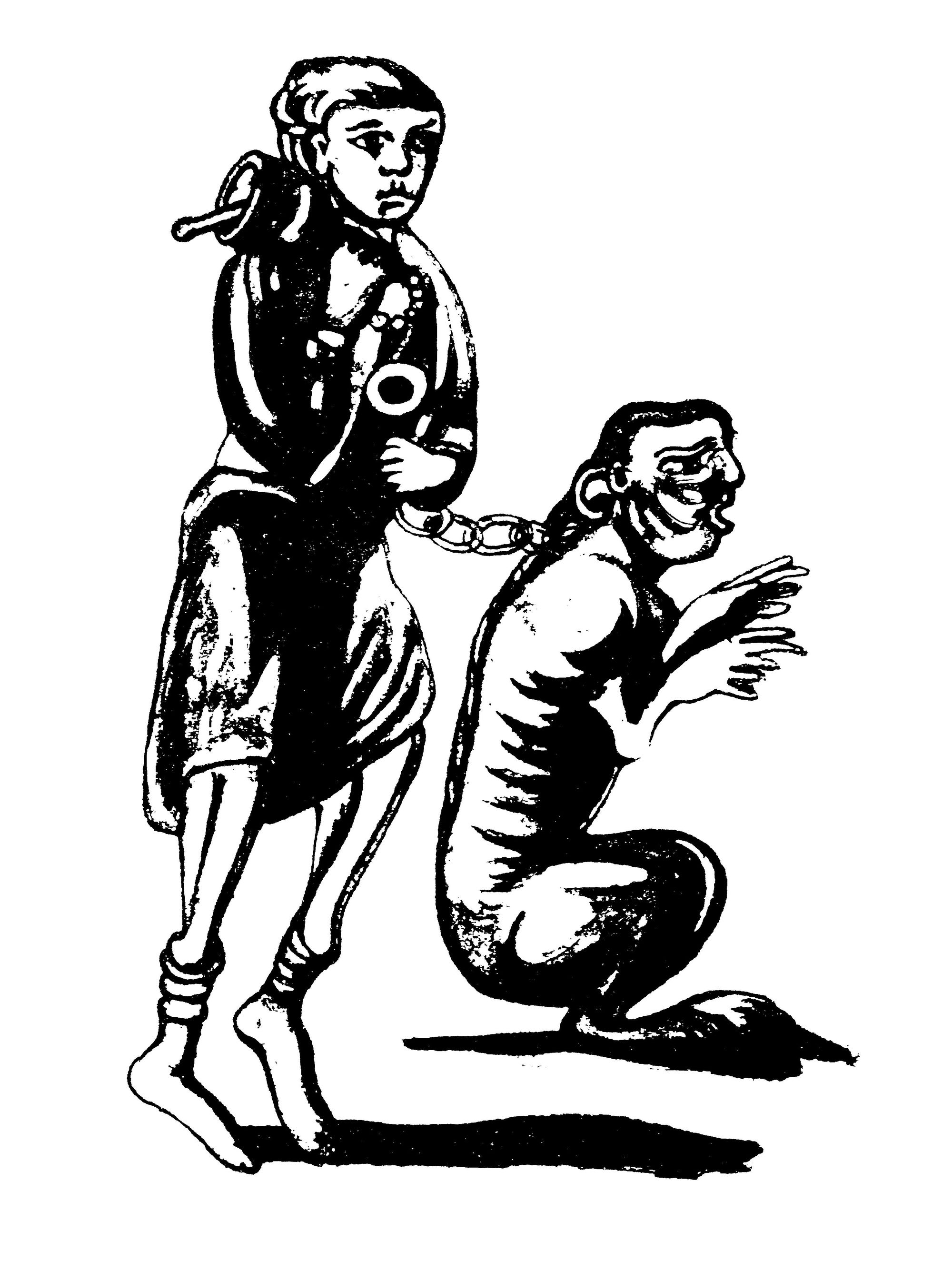
The changeling myth was once used to justify the abandonment and murder of autistic babies and children by their biological families.

Familial abuse against autistic children does not appear to be more frequent than familial abuse against non-autistic children.

However, cases of infanticide, usually committed by the mother of the autistic child, have been documented. Dozens of murders have been reported in the Western press over the past decade, particularly in the Canadian press. Each murder case is treated individually, but the general motive given for each is "autism" or "living with autism". Testimony on this subject emphasizes the supposed severity of autism and the despair it is thought to generate.

A form of extreme violence, the murder of autistic people by their relatives, is justified by the bad public perception of autism, assimilated to a "lifelong pathology" that should be fought. Some of this violence results from the medical model of autism, which promotes a vision of autism as a disease to be eradicated or an abnormality to be normalized. The extreme violence is illustrated by the accounts of murderers who want to "kill autism" in the hope of making their loved ones "normal".

Social class seems to be a predisposing factor to murder, as the infanticidal mothers did not have the financial resources to receive effective support for their disabled child.

== Violence caused by autistic people ==
According to Anne-Sophie Ferry, "Autism is not characterized by violence or outbursts of anger", though the latter sometimes results from communication difficulties or accumulated distress. Institutionalized non-speaking autistic adolescents may express violent behaviors such as spitting or biting, without understanding their actions.

Research believes some behavioral characteristics of autistic people are wrongly interpreted as violence by those around them, including dislike of physical contact, lack of eye contact, and lack of response to parents' voices. Non-speaking autistic people may have inappropriate behavior in terms of force and impact on the other person, leading them to be characterized as violent behaviors.

Furthermore, autistic people's sensory hypersensitivities can trigger reactions that are perceived as violent. Autistic individuals may attempt to cope with sensory overload by impulsively releasing it through actions such as avoidance or clawing gestures, often without considering the potential for violence; this violence may not be intended to harm others and could rather be as an effort to regulate their sensory experiences.

=== Criminal and delinquent behavior ===
No evidence exists suggesting an association between autism and delinquency, in fact, statistics show that the delinquency rate is lower among autistic individuals than among non-autistic individuals.

Individual cases of autistic criminals do not provide generalization of a predisposition to violence to the entire autistic community.

A psychological profile of two mass murderers sometimes considered autistic, Adam Lanza and Anders Behring Breivik, found that their actions were not explained by autism alone but rather by the intertwining of various factors, including the association between ASD and narcissistic personality disorder, which forms "a particularly 'explosive' combination that increases the risk that an autistic individual may engage in extremely violent behavior". Anders Breivik was diagnosed with Asperger syndrome, narcissistic personality disorder, and antisocial personality disorder.

Jeffrey Dahmer, a cannibalistic and necrophiliac serial murderer, was retrospectively diagnosed with Asperger syndrome in 2002, but the accuracy of that speculative diagnosis has been questioned. Mass murderer Dylann Roof was diagnosed with autistic traits and, possibly, ASD by forensic psychiatrist James Ballenger. However, similar to Dahmer's case, Roof's diagnosis has been questioned and even rejected by Roof himself, who said that he "would rather die than be labeled as autistic or mentally ill."

== Social perception ==
Autism is associated with inappropriate behaviors, such as violence, delinquency, crime (including mass killing) in the English, French, and German media.

Robert Chapman argued in 2017 that a bias exists in the way information about violence in autism is processed: violence experienced against non-autistic people from autistic people may receive more attention, whereas violence experienced by autistic people is invisible, or considered "normal", leading to "a collective cultural failure to recognize violence against autistic people as a significant and pressing socio cultural issue".

Media portrayals of autism and violence negatively influence public opinion on autism and foster negative impressions of autistic people by linking autism with criminal behavior. For example, an analysis of 100 French and Italian works of children's and young people's literature published between 1995 and 2005 featuring a main disabled character found that autistic people are presented as violent. The film The Specials has a line that autism educators "take a beating all day". The American film The Accountant (2016), which features an obsessive, unempathetic autistic accountant operating as a contract killer, has been called offensive to autistic people, in part because of the violence it exhibits.

Beyond fictional characterizations, news sources may perpetuate the connection between autism and violence. For instance, Adam Lanza was immediately labeled as autistic in the French media on December 14, 2012. Individual cases of autistic people versed in cybercrime and terrorism have also been documented in the press.

Activists for the rights of autistic people oppose the media's tendency to link autism and violence, arguing that social discrimination is already a source of suffering for this population. Activists began to document acts of violence committed against autistic people in the 2000s, calling for a political response.

== See also ==
- Ableism
- Discrimination against autistic people
- Sanism
- Suicide among autistic individuals

== Bibliography ==
- Chapel, Florent; Le Callenec, Florent (2016). Autisme, la grande enquête [Autism: The Big Survey] (in French). Les Arènes. ISBN 978-2-35204-529-8.
- Maras, Katie; Mulcahy, Sue; Crane, Laura (July 2015). "Is autism linked to criminality?". Autism. 19 (5): 515–516. doi:10.1177/1362361315583411.
- McGuire, Anne (2016b). "Life without autism : a cultural logic of violence". Re-Thinking Autism: Diagnosis, Identity and Equality. Jessica Kingsley Publishers. pp. 93–109. ISBN 978-1784500276.
- McGuire, Anne (2016a). War on Autism: On the Cultural Logic of Normative Violence. University of Michigan Press. ISBN 978-0472053124.
- Schmidt, Volker; Sachs, Josef (2014). Autismus und gewalt [Autism and violence] (in German). Orell Füssli. ISBN 978-3280038192.
