= Misdiagnosis of borderline personality disorder =

Borderline personality disorder (BPD) is a personality disorder characterized by a pervasive, long-term pattern of significant interpersonal relationship instability, a distorted sense of self, and intense emotional responses, which can be misdiagnosed. In medicine, misdiagnoses or medical errors can occur when a diagnosis of BPD is assigned to individuals not meeting the specific criteria, or when attributing an incorrect alternate diagnosis in cases where BPD is the accurate condition.

== Misdiagnosis ==
Borderline personality disorder has similarities in its symptomology to various other mental health conditions, while also having a high rate of comorbidity with other mood and personality disorders, as supported by various historical studies. The mood instability characteristic of BPD can be confused with bipolar disorder, and the significant role of trauma in BPD complicates its distinction from complex post-traumatic stress disorder (C-PTSD), post-traumatic stress disorder (PTSD), and Autism spectrum disorder (ASD); these factors contribute to the difficulty of accurately diagnosing BPD.

=== Complex post-traumatic stress disorder ===
Complex post-traumatic stress disorder (C-PTSD), recognized in the ICD-11 but not in the DSM-5, shares core features with BPD, such as emotional dysregulation, interpersonal difficulties, and a negative self-concept, complicating their differentiation. Unique manifestations of these symptoms in C-PTSD and BPD can aid in distinguishing between them; for instance, C-PTSD often involves reactive anger or substance use, while BPD is more associated with self-injury or suicidality. Relationship instability in BPD typically involves rapid shifts between idealization and devaluation, whereas in C-PTSD, it stems from difficulty forming close connections. Additionally, while individuals with BPD may experience fluctuating self-concepts, those with C-PTSD usually maintain a consistently negative self-image. Understanding these differences is crucial for clinicians to accurately diagnose and differentiate between C-PTSD and BPD, especially when comorbid with PTSD, underscoring the importance of comprehensive evaluations.

=== Autism Spectrum Disorder ===
Autism spectrum disorder (ASD) is a neurodevelopmental condition characterized by challenges in social communication, repetitive behaviors, and restricted interests, with symptoms varying widely. It is often underdiagnosed or misdiagnosed due to gender differences in symptom presentation and the historical male-centric development of diagnostic criteria. Many people with ASD-traits, particularly women, exhibit social camouflaging behaviors or autistic masking, which can mask core symptoms and lead to alternative diagnoses, particularly borderline personality disorder (BPD). The overlap in symptoms such as emotional dysregulation, intense interpersonal relationships, and identity disturbances, when filtered through a clinician's lens without properly considering ASD, can lead to a BPD diagnosis, potentially resulting in a misdiagnosis if meanings aligned with BPD criteria are applied rather than exploring alternative explanations during the etiological analysis phase. Furthermore, individuals with ASD, especially women, may not display the overt behavioral phenomena commonly associated with BPD, instead presenting with internalized symptoms like anxiety and depression, or with characteristics such as alexithymia—common co-occurrence in those with ASD—which complicates the diagnostic process by making it difficult to recognize and communicate their emotional experiences.

=== Bipolar disorder ===
Bipolar disorder (BD) is a mood disorder characterized by significant mood swings. It is categorized into bipolar I, involving at least one manic episode, and bipolar II, characterized by at least one hypomanic and one depressive episode. Both BD and BPD exhibit overlapping features, making differential diagnosis challenging. Affective instability and negative affectivity are core features of both disorders, albeit with variations in their nature and longevity. The difficulty in controlling anger in BPD and the presence of irritability in BD might not be easily differentiated. Impulsivity is a common trait in both conditions; however, in BD, impulsivity may diminish between mood episodes. Additionally, both disorders are characterized by high rates of suicidality and similarly impact social functioning. A small study of 700 participants showed that diagnostic criteria for BPD put patients with BPD at risk of being misdiagnosed with BD, as it found that 40% of those diagnosed with BPD report having been misdiagnosed with BD.

== Consequences of misdiagnosis ==
Misdiagnosis of BPD can result in a number of negative consequences. The reasoning for diagnosis is that of debate within the mental health field. Still, it is primarily looked at as serving the function of providing health professionals of the patient's mental health state, to inform treatment approaches, and to aid in accurately reporting successful treatment approaches. Therefore, misdiagnosis can result in outcomes such as not having access to appropriate psychiatric medications or not being provided evidence-based psychological treatment for their disorders.

=== Stigmatization ===
The misdiagnosis of Borderline Personality Disorder (BPD) can have serious negative consequences, particularly in how clinicians perceive and treat patients. Research has shown that when a patient presents with unrelated conditions, such as panic disorder, it may be incorrectly associated with a BPD diagnosis. Clinicians may rate patient's problems and prognosis more negatively than they did when the patient was not given the BPD label. This finding highlights a bias: clinicians may hold negative perceptions of BPD, which can influence their judgments and lead to inadequate or inappropriate treatment. Consequently, a misdiagnosis of BPD can result in stigmatization, reduced quality of care, and a potential overlooking of the patient's actual condition.

=== Psychological ===
Misdiagnosis of BPD can also result in adverse psychological consequences as a diagnosis is used in determining evidence-based treatment approaches used in the therapeutic setting. Treatment approaches such as dialectical behavior therapy and cognitive behavioral therapy for borderline personality disorder are two evidence-based treatments shown to be effective in the treatment of BPD. By providing a misdiagnosis, a person with BPD would likely not have access to these specific treatment approaches, and therefore, their access to evidence-based treatment for their BPD would be delayed until an accurate diagnosis is given. In those with ASD, BPD-related treatment strategies do not address the underlying neurodevelopmental aspects of ASD. Unlike BPD, where emotional dysregulation is typically reactive and situation-dependent, ASD-related emotional challenges often stem from sensory overload or difficulties in social communication. Consequently, treatment plans tailored for BPD, such as dialectical behavior therapy (DBT), may not be as effective for individuals with ASD, who might benefit more from interventions focused on sensory processing and social skills training. Misdiagnosis can also contribute to increased stigma and misunderstanding of the individual's needs, potentially exacerbating mental health issues like anxiety and depression.

=== Medical ===
As diagnosis is an essential part of determining what medications to prescribe to a patient or if a patient would benefit from psychopharmacotherapy, being misdiagnosed can have a range of adverse outcomes. Current research has indicated while some prescription medications can help with specific symptoms of BPD, there is no medication proven to decrease BPD symptoms as a whole. In contrast, disorders such as bipolar disorder (BD) have a range of psychiatric medications (e.g., Lithium, anticonvulsants, GABA analogs) being used as a first-line approach to treatment. By providing people with BPD with misdiagnoses such as BD, people with BPD can be subject to receiving medications that will not impact their symptomology and may result in adverse side effects. Alternatively, people who are diagnosed with BPD who may instead have BD or C-PTSD (complex post-traumatic stress disorder) may be deprived of psychopharmacological interventions that would decrease symptoms severity.

== See also ==
- Misdiagnosis of autism
