= Discrimination against autistic people =

Discrimination against autistic people involves any form of discrimination, persecution, or oppression against autistic people. Autistic people face discrimination of various kinds, both directly and indirectly, extending into a variety of settings such as the professional, educational, and clinical. Such discrimination is often initiated after other people consciously or unconsciously identify the autistic person as being different from themselves, which may occur very quickly. Discrimination oftentimes presents together with associated phenomena, such as violence, assault, and social exclusion. Discrimination against autistic people is also considered a form of ableism.

== Prevalence ==
=== Ireland ===
In 2021, Adam Harris of AsIAm said that class was a factor in reluctance of schools in wealthy areas to enrol students with special needs. He was speaking to an Oireachtas committee on education. Campaigners there called for the Education of Persons with Special Needs (Espen) Act to be fully implemented. Harris said that recent attempts to make schools in South Dublin open special needs classes resulted in most new classes being in less wealthy areas, with few in Dublin 2, Dublin 4, Dublin 6 or Dublin 6W. He said there appeared to be a "hierarchy of rights" in some wealthy schools which were open to expanding facilities for existing pupils but were against enrolling autistic pupils. He said "What they are arguing is that they have an obligation to some pupils, but that is negated if they had a disability".

Research published by charity AsIAm in 2022 showed that 6 in 10 Irish people associated autism with negatively perceived characteristics such as "not making eye contact", "difficulty making friends" and "no to little verbal communication". People were less likely to know the positive traits associated with autism, such as logical thinking, honesty and being detail-oriented. The survey found that 10% of autistic people surveyed felt workplaces were inclusive.

The Same Chance report was based on two surveys conducted on behalf of AsIAm – the first, by Core Research, assessed public attitudes toward autistic people by surveying 1,000 members of the general public. The second survey was of 944 parents, carers, and autistic people over the age of 18.

The issues raised in the second survey included accessing healthcare, education, employment, and housing.

=== United Kingdom ===
Research published in 2019 used data from more than 8,000 children in the University of London's Millennium Cohort Study, which tracks the lives of about 19,000 people born in the United Kingdom starting in 2000. Out of the children selected, 231 were autistic. The study from the Journal of Autism and Developmental Disorders found that these autistic children were more likely to engage in "two-way sibling bullying", meaning being both a victim and perpetrator of bullying.

Further research published in 2017, a meta-analysis of three studies, demonstrated that "first impressions of individuals with ASD made from thin slices of real-world social behavior by typically-developing observers are not only far less favorable across a range of trait judgments compared to controls, but also are associated with reduced intentions to pursue social interaction." The meta-analysis continues, "These patterns are remarkably robust, occur within seconds, do not change with increased exposure, and persist across both child and adult age groups." This may be why autistic people have "smaller social networks and fewer friendships, difficulty securing and retaining employment, high rates of loneliness, and an overall reduced quality of life." Smaller social networks, fewer friendships, and loneliness correlate with severe negative health outcomes. According to a paper published in the Journal of Health and Social Behavior, "Health risks associated with social isolation have been compared in magnitude to the well-known dangers of smoking cigarettes and obesity." Furthermore, according to the UK Office for National Statistics, the unemployment rate of autistic people may reach 85%, the highest rate among all disabled groups studied. It is noted that in many countries, autism is not a disability protected by anti-discrimination employment laws, and this is due to many corporations lobbying against it. Autistic adults are also more likely to face healthcare disparities, such as being unvaccinated against common diseases like tetanus and being more likely to use emergency services.

Autistic people are also less likely to finish their education at secondary school, college, or other forms of higher education, further contributing to high rates of unemployment and lower quality of life. This failure to complete education can be in part attributed to a lack of support from educational institutions. In the UK, only one quarter of autistic children in state-funded schools feel happy and are thus able to achieve their maximum potential.

=== United States ===
In the United States, disabled people are victims of violent crime three times as often as non-disabled people. The Bureau of Justice Statistics does not report separately on autistic victims, but it does note that the victimization rate is especially high among those whose disabilities are cognitive. A small-sample study of Americans and Canadians found that autistic adults face a greater risk of sexual victimization than their peers. Autistic respondents were more than twice as likely to say they had been the victim of rape and over three times as likely to report unwanted sexual contact. In 2018, a large scale study found that autistic girls were almost three times more likely to be a victim of sexual abuse compared to non-autistic girls.

== Discrimination in media and culture ==
Representation of autistic people in media has perpetuated myths about autism, including characterizing autism as shameful and burdensome for family members, advertising fake cures for autism, and publicizing the long-disproven arguments surrounding vaccines and autism. These myths are perpetuated in mass media, news media, and social media. Stigmatization of autism can also be perpetuated by advertising from autism conversion organizations, such as Autism Speaks' advertising wherein Alison Singer describes having considered murder-suicide in front of her autistic daughter or the NYU Child Study Center's advertisements where autism is personified as a kidnapper holding children for ransom.

Moreover, stimming in autistic people, which is often more intense than in non-autistic people, is frequently referred to as "distracting". Conversational tones and behaviors seen in many autistic people are often described as "rude". Stimming specifically is often targeted in therapies such as applied behavior analysis, even though it is vital to self regulation.

== Physical health-related research ==
In the United States, recently published research shows that the National Institutes of Health (NIH) has not funded grants focused on the treatment of physical health disparity conditions, such as insomnia, cardiovascular disease, and other conditions, in autistic adults across four decades of research funding. McDonald and Scudder (2023) explicitly distinguish health-disparity conditions that affect the lives of autistic people from research grants focused on the cause, "cure", and prevention of autism. Although their research focused on autistic adults without an intellectual disability, the research did not exclude this population and found a lack of funded grants focused on the treatment of health disparity conditions for intellectually disabled autistic adults. The research describes several systemic discriminatory "nodes" of practices and policies that may contribute to the apparent discrimination in research grant funding. These include the exclusion of disability populations from groups designated for physical health disparity research grants, the designation of autism as a "primary disease;" a designation used as a rationale for some National Institutes of Health (e.g., the National Heart, Lung, and Blood Institute) to exclude research focused on autistic populations from grant funding review, and the pressure on early career researchers by academic institutions (that receive NIH funding) to either change their research topic or their population for NIH grant applications and to avoid challenging NIH policies until they are at a more advanced stage in their career.

== Immigration ==
In the United States, the first Trump administration supported restrictive immigration policies that discriminated against autistic people. Under these policies, autistic immigrants faced deportation.

In Canada, autistic immigrants have been denied citizenship, or they have faced deportation due to the perception that they are a "burden" upon the Canadian medical system. In 2018, reforms in Canadian immigration law were announced – these reforms are supposed to make it easier for autistic and disabled immigrants to migrate to Canada.

New Zealand effectively prohibits the application for permanent residency for autistic people "where significant support is required".

Australia's health criteria have prompted criticism about its immigration policies. Australia forbids the immigration of people who would be exceptionally costly for the nation's health care or social services. Autistic people are subject to this policy.

== See also ==
- Ableism
- Autism rights movement
- Autism-friendly
- Empathy in autistic people
- Neurodiversity
- Suicide among autistic individuals
- Violence and autism
