= Conditions comorbid to autism =

Medical conditions more common in autistic people

There are several conditions comorbid to autism, which is a condition classified as a neurodevelopmental disorder that begins in early childhood, persists throughout adulthood, and is characterized by difficulties in social communication and restricted, repetitive patterns of behavior.

In medicine, comorbidity is the presence of one or more additional conditions co-occurring with the primary one, or the effect of such additional conditions. Distinguishing between autism and other diagnoses can be challenging because the traits of autism often overlap with symptoms of other conditions, and the characteristics of autism make traditional diagnostic procedures difficult, sometimes resulting in misdiagnosis. Examples of comorbidities include attention deficit hyperactivity disorder, anxiety disorders, and epilepsy.

Autism is associated with several genetic disorders, perhaps due to an overlap in genetic causes. About 10–15% of autism cases have an identifiable Mendelian (single-gene) condition, chromosome abnormality, or other genetic syndrome, a category referred to as syndromic autism.

Euler diagram showing overlapping clinical phenotypes in genes associated with monogenic forms of autism, dystonia, epilepsy and schizophrenia: Genes associated with epilepsy Genes associated with schizophrenia Genes associated with autism spectrum disorder Genes associated with dystonia

== Comorbid conditions ==
=== Anxiety disorders ===
Anxiety disorders are common among children and adults with autism. Symptoms are likely affected by age, level of cognitive functioning, degree of social impairment, and autism-specific difficulties. Many anxiety disorders, such as social anxiety disorder and generalized anxiety disorder, are not commonly diagnosed in people with autism because such symptoms are better explained by autism itself, and it is often difficult to tell whether symptoms such as compulsive checking are part of autism or a co-occurring anxiety problem. The prevalence of anxiety disorders in children with autism has been reported to be anywhere between 11% and 84%; the wide range is likely due to differences in the ways the studies were conducted.

A systematic review summarized available evidence on interventions to reduce anxiety in school children with autism. Of the 24 studies reviewed, 22 used a cognitive behavioral therapy (CBT) approach. The review found that CBT was moderately to highly effective at reducing anxiety in school children with autism, but that effects varied depending on whether they were reported by clinicians, parents or self-reported. CBT was found to be only moderately effective at reducing anxiety when autistic people reported the effects themselves. Treatments involving parents and one-on-one compared to group treatments were more effective.

=== Attention deficit hyperactivity disorder ===
Previously, the diagnosis manual DSM-IV did not allow the co-diagnosis of autism and attention deficit hyperactivity disorder (ADHD). However, following years of clinical research, the DSM-5 released in 2013 removed this prohibition of co-morbidity. Thus, individuals with autism may also have a diagnosis of ADHD, with the modifiers of a predominantly inattentive, hyperactive, combined, or not otherwise specified presentation. Clinically significant symptoms of these two conditions commonly co-occur, and children with both sets of symptoms may respond poorly to standard ADHD treatments. Individuals with autism may benefit from additional types of medications. The term AuDHD is sometimes used for those with both autism and ADHD. There are also studies suggesting noticeable differences in presenting symptoms by gender which can complicate diagnosis, especially in adulthood.

=== Avoidant/restrictive food intake disorder ===
Avoidant/restrictive food intake disorder (ARFID) is a feeding or eating disorder in which individuals significantly limit the volume or variety of foods they consume, causing malnutrition, weight loss, and psychosocial problems. A 2023 review concluded that "there is considerable overlap between ARFID and autism," finding that 8% to 55% of children diagnosed with ARFID were autistic. Unlike eating disorders such as anorexia nervosa and bulimia, body image disturbance is not a root cause. Individuals with ARFID may have trouble eating due to the sensory characteristics of food (appearance, smell, texture, or taste); executive function dysregulation; fears of choking or vomiting; low appetite; or a combination of these factors.

=== Bipolar disorder ===
Bipolar disorder, or manic-depression, is itself often claimed to be comorbid with a number of conditions, including autism.

=== Bowel disease ===
Gastrointestinal symptoms are a common comorbidity in autistic people, even though the underlying mechanisms are largely unknown. The most common gastrointestinal symptoms reported by proprietary tool developed and administered by Mayer, Padua, and Tillisch (2014) are abdominal pain, constipation, diarrhea and bloating, reported in at least 25 percent of participants.

=== Depression ===
Major depressive disorder has been shown by several studies to be one of the most common comorbid conditions in those who are autistic. In addition, the presentation of depression in autism can depend on the level of cognitive functioning in the individual, with lower functioning children displaying more behavioral issues and higher functioning children displaying more traditional depressive symptoms.

A 2019 meta-analysis identified autistic people as being four times more likely to have depression than non-autistic people, with approximately 40% of autistic adults having depression.

=== Developmental coordination disorder (dyspraxia) ===
The initial accounts of Asperger syndrome and other diagnostic schemes include descriptions of developmental coordination disorder. Children with autism may be delayed in acquiring motor skills that require motor dexterity, such as bicycle riding or opening a jar, and may appear awkward or "uncomfortable in their own skin". They may be poorly coordinated, or have an odd or bouncy gait or posture, poor handwriting, other hand/dexterity impairments, or problems with visual-motor integration, visual-perceptual skills, and conceptual learning. They may show problems with proprioception (sensation of body position) on measures of developmental coordination disorder, balance, tandem gait, and finger-thumb apposition.

=== Epilepsy ===
Autism is also associated with epilepsy, with variations in risk of epilepsy due to age, cognitive level, and type of language disorder. One in four autistic children develop seizures, often starting either in early childhood or adolescence. Seizures, caused by abnormal electrical activity in the brain, can produce a temporary loss of consciousness (a "blackout"), a body convulsion, unusual movements, or staring spells. Sometimes a contributing factor is a lack of sleep or a high fever. An EEG can help confirm the seizure's presence. Typically, onset of epilepsy occurs before age five or during puberty, and is more common in females and individuals who also have a comorbid intellectual disability.

=== Fetal alcohol spectrum disorder ===
Fetal alcohol spectrum disorders (FASD) are a group of conditions that can occur in a person who is exposed to alcohol during gestation. Evidence on the link between FASD and autism is limited. Although results from studies are mixed, it is estimated that 2.6% of children with an FASD are autistic as well, a rate almost two times higher than that reported in the general US population. However, there is no information on the prevalence of FASD amongst those with autism.

=== Fragile X syndrome ===
Fragile X syndrome is the most common inherited form of intellectual disability. It was so named because one part of the X chromosome has a defective piece that appears pinched and fragile when under a microscope. Fragile X syndrome accounts for approximately 5% of all cases of ASD.

=== Gender dysphoria ===
Gender dysphoria is a diagnosis given to transgender people who experience discomfort related to their gender identity. Autistic people are more likely to experience gender dysphoria. Around 20% of gender identity clinic-assessed individuals reported characteristics of autism.

=== Hypermobility spectrum disorder and Ehlers–Danlos syndromes ===
Studies have confirmed a link between hereditary connective tissue disorders such as Ehlers-Danlos syndromes (EDS) and hypermobility spectrum disorder (HSD) with autism, as a comorbidity and a co-occurrence within the same families.

=== Intellectual disability ===
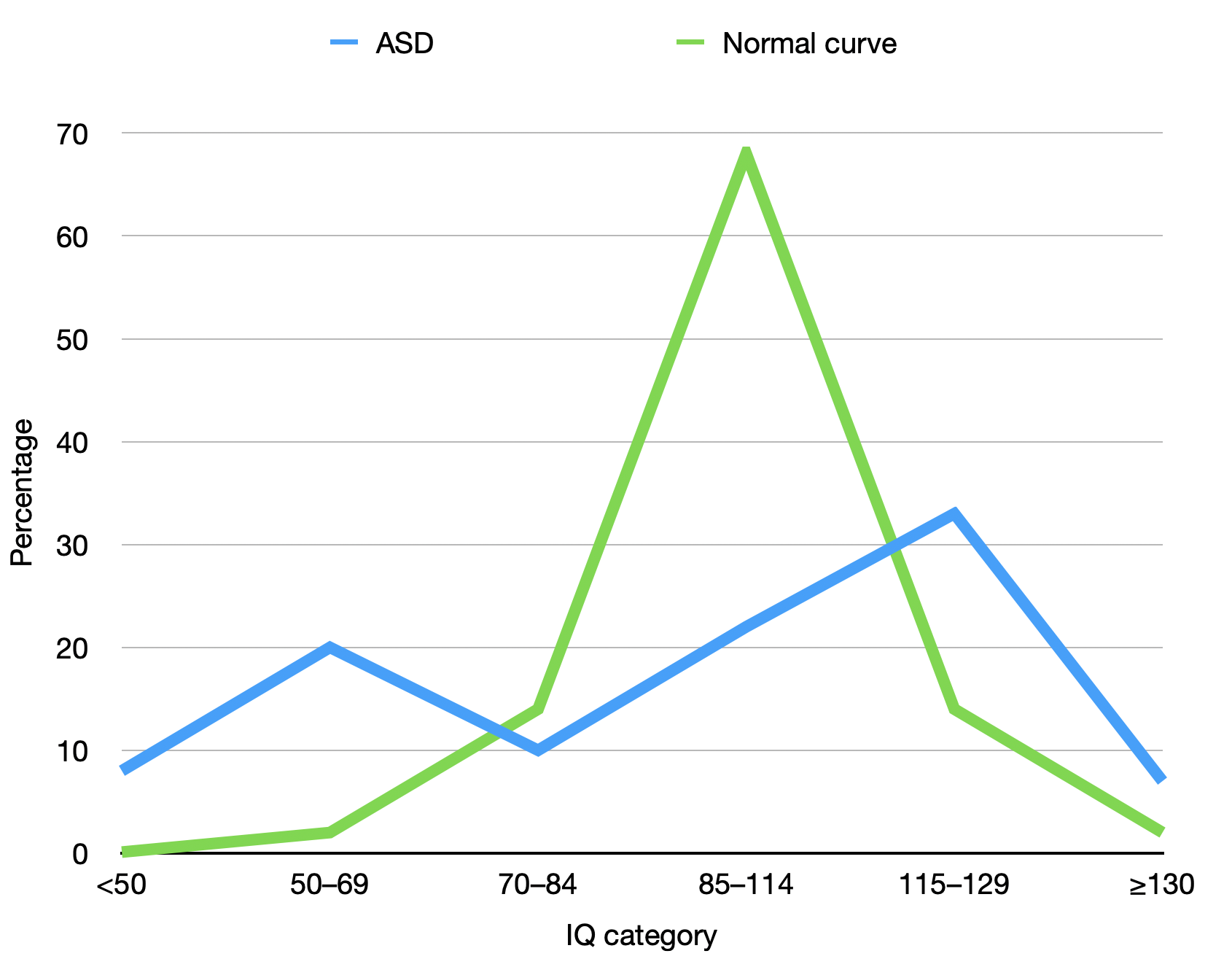
IQ distribution in autistic (blue line) and non-autistic people (light green line). IQ in non-autistic people follows a typical bell curve, peaking at the average value (100), while IQ in autistic people shows a double peak, both above and below the average.

The fraction of autistic individuals who also meet criteria for intellectual disability has been reported as anywhere from 25% to 70%. This wide variation illustrates the difficulty of assessing intelligence in autistic individuals. Learning disabilities are also highly comorbid in individuals with autism. Approximately 25–75% of individuals with autism also have some degree of learning disability, although the types of learning disability vary depending on the specific strengths and weaknesses of the individual.

A 2006 review questioned the common assumption that most children with autism have an intellectual disability.

The CDC states that based on information from 11 reporting states 46% of people with autism have above 85 IQ.

=== Mitochondrial diseases ===
The central player in bioenergetics is the mitochondrion. Mitochondria produce about 90% of cellular energy, regulate cellular redox status, produce ROS, maintain Ca^{2+} homeostasis, synthesize and degrade high-energy biochemical intermediates, and regulate cell death through activation of the mitochondrial permeability transition pore (mtPTP). When they fail, less and less energy is generated within the cell. Cell injury and even cell death follow. If this process is repeated throughout the body, whole organ systems begin to fail.

Mitochondrial diseases are a heterogeneous group of disorders that can affect multiple organs with varying severity. Symptoms may be acute or chronic with intermittent decompensation. Neurological manifestations include encephalopathy, stroke, cognitive regression, seizures, cardiopathies (cardiac conduction defects, hypertensive heart disease, cardiomyopathy, etc...), diabetes, visual and hearing loss, organ failure, neuropathic pain and peripheral neuropathy.

Mitochondrial disease is estimated to affect less than 0.1% of the general population. Approximately 5% of autistic children meet the criteria for classical mitochondrial dysfunction. It is unclear why this mitochondrial disease occurs, considering that only 23% of children with both autism and mitochondrial disease present with mitochondrial DNA abnormalities.

=== Neurofibromatosis type I ===
Autism is also associated with neurofibromatosis type I (NF-1). NF-1 is a complex multi-system human disorder caused by the mutation of a gene on chromosome 17 that is responsible for production of a protein, called neurofibromin 1, which is needed for normal function in many human cell types. NF-1 causes tumors along the nervous system which can grow anywhere on the body. NF-1 is one of the most common genetic disorders and is not limited to any person's race or sex. NF-1 is an autosomal dominant disorder, which means that mutation or deletion of one copy (or allele) of the NF-1 gene is sufficient for the development of NF-1, although presentation varies widely and is often different even between relatives affected by NF-1.

=== Neuroinflammation and immune disorders ===
The role of the immune system and neuroinflammation in the development of autism is controversial. A 2013 review also found evidence of microglial activation and increased cytokine production in postmortem brain samples from people with autism.

=== Obsessive–compulsive disorder ===
Obsessive–compulsive disorder (OCD) is diagnosed by the presence of obsessions (unwanted, intrusive thoughts, images or urges) that cause significant discomfort and/or compulsions (repetitive mental or behavioral acts) that a person feels driven to do to decrease their discomfort and/or get rid of the obsession. The presentation of compulsions in OCD can overlap with the restricted and repetitive behavior seen in autism. OCD individuals often avoid thinking about their obsessions, while autistic individuals may hyper-fixate on an obsession and not find their intrusive thoughts distressing.

An estimated 24% of autistic adults have OCD. The National Institute for Health and Care Excellence (NICE) recommends two main therapies for OCD: cognitive behavioral therapy (CBT) and/or Exposure and Response Prevention (ERP) therapy to help break down problems into their separate parts such as thoughts, physical feelings and actions.

=== Post-traumatic stress disorder ===
Autistic people are considered to be at an increased risk of experiencing and being affected detrimentally by traumatic childhood and adverse life events.

A 2025 meta-analysis of the literature found that autistic people have prevalence rates of post-traumatic stress disorder (PTSD) comparable to the general population, though it noted that, since diagnosis of PTSD needs for someone to experience "Criterion A" trauma (that is, actual or threatened death, serious injury or sexual violence), autistic people who experience clinically significant PTSD symptoms due to events not included therein may not be diagnosed.

=== Psychosis and schizophrenia ===
Childhood-onset schizophrenia is preceded by childhood autism in almost half of cases, and an increasing number of similarities are being discovered between the two conditions.

=== Schizoid personality disorder ===
Several studies have reported an overlap, confusion or comorbidity with Asperger syndrome (which has been combined with autism and no longer appears as a diagnostic label in the DSM-5). Asperger syndrome was once called "schizoid disorder of childhood". Eugen Bleuler coined the term "autism" to describe withdrawal to an internal fantasy, against which any influence from outside becomes an intolerable disturbance.

Although the cause for this comorbidity is not yet certain, genetic evidence for a spectrum between cluster A personality disorders/schizophrenia and autism has been found. (Note: See Imprinted brain hypothesis, Causes of schizophrenia, DUF1220)

=== Self-injury and suicide ===
Self-injurious behaviors are relatively common in autistic people, and can include head-banging, self-cutting, self-biting, and hair-pulling. Some of these can result in serious injury or death. Autistic people are about three times as likely as non-autistic people to engage in self-injury.

Theories about the cause of self-injurious behavior in children with developmental delay, including autistic children, include:

- Frequency or continuation of self-injurious behavior can be influenced by environmental factors (e.g., reward in return for halting self-injurious behavior). This theory does not apply to younger children with autism. There is some evidence that frequency of self-injurious behavior can be reduced by removing or modifying environmental factors that reinforce the behavior.
- Self-injury could be a response to modulate pain perception when chronic pain or other health problems that cause pain are present.
- Abnormal basal ganglia connectivity may predispose to self-injurious behavior.

Risk factors for self-harm and suicidality include circumstances that could affect anyone, such as mental health problems (e.g., anxiety disorder) and social problems (e.g., unemployment and social isolation), plus factors that affect only autistic people, such as actively trying to behave like a neurotypical person, which is called masking.

Rates of suicidality vary significantly depending upon what is being measured. This is partly because questionnaires developed for neurotypical subjects are not always valid for autistic people. As of 2023, the Suicidal Behaviours Questionnaire–Autism Spectrum Conditions (SBQ-ASC) is the only test validated for autistic people. According to some estimates, about a quarter of autistic youth and a third of all autistic people have experienced suicidal ideation at some point. Rates of suicidal ideation are the same for people formally diagnosed with autism and people who have typical intelligence and are believed to have autism but have not been diagnosed.

Although most people who attempt suicide are not autistic, autistic people are about three times as likely as non-autistic people to make a suicide attempt. Less than 10% of autistic youth have attempted suicide, but 15% to 25% autistic adults have. The rates of suicide attempts are the same among people formally diagnosed with autism and those who have typical intelligence and are believed to have autism but have not been diagnosed. The rate of suicide results in a global excess mortality among autistic people equal to approximately 2% of all suicide deaths each year.

=== Sensory issues ===
Unusual responses to sensory stimuli are more common and prominent in individuals with autism, and sensory abnormalities are commonly recognized as diagnostic criteria in autism, as reported in the DSM-5; although there is no good evidence that sensory symptoms differentiate autism from other developmental conditions. Sensory processing disorder (SPD) is comorbid with autism, with comorbidity rates of 42–88%. With or without meeting the standards of SPD, about 90% of autistic individuals have some type of atypical sensory experiences, described as both hyper- and hypo-reactivity.

=== Sleep disorders ===
Sleep disorders are commonly reported by parents of individuals with autism, including late sleep onset, early morning awakening, and poor sleep maintenance; sleep disturbances are present in 53–78% of individuals with autism. Unlike general pediatric insomnia, which has its roots in behavior, sleep disorders in individuals with autism are comorbid with other neurobiological, medical, and psychiatric issues.

There are no Food and Drug Administration-approved pharmacological treatments for pediatric insomnia at this time.

Studies have found abnormalities in the physiology of melatonin and circadian rhythm in people with autism.

=== Strabismus ===
According to several studies, there is a high prevalence of strabismus in autistic individuals, with rates 3–10 times that of the general population.

=== Tourette syndrome ===
The prevalence of Tourette syndrome among individuals who are autistic is estimated to be 6.5%, higher than the 2% to 3% prevalence for the general population. Several hypotheses for this association have been advanced, including common genetic factors and dopamine, glutamate or serotonin abnormalities.

=== Tuberous sclerosis ===
Tuberous sclerosis is a rare genetic disorder that causes benign tumors to grow in the brain as well as in other vital organs. It has a consistently strong association with the autism spectrum. One to four percent of autistic people also have tuberous sclerosis. Studies have reported that between 25% and 61% of individuals with tuberous sclerosis meet the diagnostic criteria for autism with an even higher proportion showing features of a broader pervasive developmental disorder.

=== Other mental disorders ===
Phobias and other psychopathological disorders have often been described along with autism but this has not been assessed systematically.
