= AuDHD =

Comorbidity of autism and ADHD

AuDHD is a non-clinical term used to describe the comorbidity of autism spectrum disorder (ASD) and attention deficit hyperactivity disorder (ADHD). The combination of disorders is characterized by fundamental attributes of ASD (communication impairment and sensory needs) as well as the basic attributes of ADHD (hyperactivity and trouble with holding attention or inhibition). The co-occurrence of the two disorders was debated by the Diagnostic and Statistical Manual of Mental Disorders (DSM) until 2013 in the DSM-5, when it was officially recognized and double-diagnoses were endorsed.

== Signs and characteristics ==
Although AuDHD is the presence of two individual neurodevelopmental disorders, it can present itself in unique ways due to the combination of symptoms. ASD is characterized by social and sensory difficulties, while ADHD is characterized by hyperactivity and impulsivity. Individuals with both ASD and ADHD report having trouble reconciling the symptoms of both disorders. Autism may cause individuals to want to maintain strict order, but combined with ADHD, a disorder that makes it hard to stay organized, it can be extremely difficult to do so. The hyperactivity of ADHD causes strain on the sensory specifications that autism warrants. In addition, studies have also suggested that autism and ADHD can present differently by gender, making it more difficult to diagnose based on one set of criteria. However, the disorders do overlap in many ways. For example, individuals with ADHD and autism have areas of extreme interest or hyperfocus, trouble engaging in social situations, and specific sensory needs.

A 2021 meta-analysis found a high rate of comorbidity between the two conditions, estimating that approximately 29% of individuals with ASD have co-occurring ADHD, while lifetime prevalence is estimated at 40%. True co-occurrence rates may be higher than historical data suggests, as dual diagnosis was prohibited by the DSM-IV until the release of the DSM-5 in 2013.

== Management ==
Both disorders can be managed through specialized forms of behavioral therapy, such as cognitive behavioral therapy.

Medication for those with AuDHD is not uncommon; however, this medication is mainly used to target features of ADHD rather than autism. Many forms of treatment work to address the conditions individually rather than addressing them as a whole. Stimulants — particularly dexamphetamine, methylphenidate, and closely related compounds — are widely used in the management of ADHD.

== History ==
Before the publication of the DSM-5 in 2013, ASD and ADHD were considered too similar to be diagnosed in tandem. However, after an abundance of research on the disorders and how they differ, diagnostic recommendations shifted, allowing both conditions to be diagnosed at the same time.

The word AuDHD is a community-built, non-clinical term created to envelop the presence of both disorders. Online communities such as YouTube have co-opted the term to describe their neurodivergent identities.
