= Sex and gender differences in autism =

Differences in autism diagnosis frequencies with respect to gender

Sex and gender differences in autism exist regarding prevalence, presentation, and diagnosis.

Men and boys are more frequently diagnosed with autism than women and girls. It is debated whether this is due to a sex difference in rates of autism spectrum disorders (ASD) or whether females are underdiagnosed. The prevalence ratio is often cited as about four males for every one female diagnosed. Other research indicates that it is closer to 3:1 or 2:1. One in every 42 males and one in 189 females in the United States is diagnosed with autism spectrum disorder. There is some evidence that females may also receive diagnoses somewhat later than males; however, thus far results have been contradictory.

Men and boys tend to have higher rates of autism diagnosis, existing literature suggests that this can be attributed to the diagnostic frameworks which are based around men's behaviours and symptoms rather than reflecting the likelihood of having autism based on biological sex or gender. Current research highlights that current diagnostic tools for ASD have been shaped by men and boys' behaviours and symptoms and has indicated a significant implicit gender bias towards associating males with autistic traits. This is consistent with having a higher male-to-female autism ratio and it supports the view that females are under-diagnosed or diagnosed later in life. This brings up the notion of whether autism is perceived as a male condition and disregards females with autism.

Delayed diagnosis in women and girls can be attributed to socio-cultural expectations which induces camouflaging or "masking" strategies to present behaviours that are more societally acceptable. Moreover, gendered socialisation influences such strategies and affects how girls and women express autism, whereby, girls are expected to have caring, social and empathic characteristics before exhibiting behaviours that are more commonly associated with autism, such as aggressiveness and unresponsiveness. This conceals underlying autism symptoms due to differences in perceiving such traits in girls and boys.

== Background ==
Hans Asperger was one of the first people to study autism, with all of his four study subjects being male. Another early researcher, Leo Kanner, described "autistic disturbances of affective contact" in the group consisting of eight boys and three girls.

Autism Spectrum Disorder is commonly defined as a neurological developmental disorder with symptoms of poor social communication, repetitive behaviors, sensory sensitivities, executive dysfunction, and hyper-fixations. Women are less likely to be diagnosed as autistic than men; they are often misdiagnosed or not noticed to be neurodivergent by doctors. Women are also more likely to be diagnosed as autistic at a later age than men. There are many theories to explain this discrepancy in diagnoses, the most prominent being extreme male brain theory, imprinted brain theory, female protective effect theory, and female autism phenotype theory.

== Theories explaining gender diagnosis disparity ==
=== Extreme male brain theory ===
Extreme male brain theory is an extension of the empathizing-systemizing theory, which categorizes people into 5 different groups based on their empathizing and systemizing expressions. In the general neurotypical population, females have a greater ability to empathize, and males have a greater ability to systemize. Simon Baron-Cohen's extreme male brain theory states that autistic males have higher doses of prenatal testosterone and on average have a more systemizing brain, as opposed to the more empathizing female brain. He suggests that autistic brains show an exaggeration of the features associated with male brains. These are mainly size and connectivity, with males generally having a larger brain, which is seen in an exaggerated form in those with ASD.

Individuals with ASD were found to have widespread abnormalities in interconnectivity and general functioning in specific brain regions. This could explain the different results on empathy tests between men and women as well as the deficiencies in empathy seen in ASD, as empathy requires several brain regions to be activated which need information from many different areas of the brain. Baron-Cohen therefore argues that genetic factors play a role in autism prevalence and that children with technically minded parents are more likely to be diagnosed with autism. Although autistic females have been documented to have higher testosterone levels, which could support the extreme male brain theory, not all autistic females show male-specific symptoms, leaving the extreme male brain theory with Autism Spectrum Disorder to be controversial.

=== Imprinted brain theory ===
The imprinted brain theory suggests genomic imprinting is at least partly responsible for the sex differences in autism and implicates schizophrenia as well, claiming that genetic and physiological evidence suggests the two conditions are on a spectrum in which some mutations in certain genes cause lower social cognition but higher practical cognition (autism) while other mutations in the same genes cause lower practical cognition with higher social cognition (schizophrenia).

=== Female protective effect theory ===
According to the female protective effect hypothesis, more genetic mutations are required for a girl to develop autism than for a boy. In 2012, Harvard researchers published findings suggesting that, on average, more genetic and environmental risk factors are required for girls to develop autism, compared to boys. The researchers analyzed DNA samples of nearly 800 families affected by autism and nearly 16,000 individuals with a variety of neurodevelopmental disorders. They looked for various types of gene mutations. Overall, they found that females diagnosed with autism or another neurodevelopmental disorder had a greater number of harmful mutations throughout the genome than did males with the same disorders. Women with an extra X chromosome, 47,XXX or triple X syndrome, have autism-like social impairments in 32% of cases.

=== Female autism phenotype theory ===
The prevalence ratio is often cited as about four males for every one female diagnosed. Other research indicates that it closer to 3:1 or 2:1.

Some have suggested a differential phenotype for autistic women; "a female-specific manifestation of autistic strengths and difficulties, which fits imperfectly with current, male-based conceptualisations" of autism. The female autism phenotype differs from the typical male autism phenotype in social relationships, relational interests, internalizing problems, and camouflaging.

Some authors, clinicians and experts like Judith Gould, Tony Attwood, Lorna Wing and Christopher Gillberg have proposed that autism in females may be underdiagnosed due to better natural superficial social mimicry skills in females, partially different set of symptoms and less knowledge about autism in females among experts. In his preword to the book Asperger's and Girls, Attwood writes: "These tentative explanations for the apparent underrepresentation of girls with Asperger's Syndrome have yet to be examined by objective research studies."

Another clinician, William Mandy, hypothesized referrals for ASD assessment are often started by teachers. Girls with ASD may sometimes lack the skills of social communication and this is not noticed until they are in a school setting. Therefore, girls suggested to have ASD may receive delayed or no clinical assessment. Compared with males, females with autism are more likely to mask their special interests (strong or intense interests in specific topics or objects), which could decrease the chances of diagnosis.

In the early 21st century, literature has exemplified that autistic females present lower levels of restricted and repetitive interests. However, some studies suggest that autistic females' interests are in areas that aren't considered atypical or captured in the diagnostic process as compared to autistic males' special interests.

Various studies suggest that autistic females are more likely to have co-occurring internalizing disorders, while their male counterparts are more likely to have co-occurring externalizing disorders. Internalizing problems (the inward expression of emotional difficulties, in contrast to externalizing problems), while not a core feature of autism, could still affect how females present symptoms of autism. For example, more severe expressions of these co-occurring internalizing disorders could mask underlying symptoms of autism. Moreover, if males are more likely to present with co-occurring externalizing disorders, their symptoms could be more disruptive, thereby being noticed by teachers and caregivers sooner than females with autism who have co-occurring internalizing disorders.

Camouflaging, the conscious or unconscious manners individuals learn or develop to hide their autistic symptoms, has been found to be more prevalent in autistic girls than boys, but other literature displays varied results. When it comes to social camouflaging, there are three sub-categories according to the Camouflaging Autistic Traits Questionnaire (CAT-Q): Masking, Assimilation, and Compensation. Masking is the act of constantly monitoring one's behavior in order to hide one's autistic traits or putting on a fake persona. Assimilation is known as "hiding in plain sight" or trying to blend in with non-autistic peers. Finally, compensation is trying to over-compensate for a lack of social abilities. Examples of this can include mimicking real or fictional people, over exaggerating non-verbal expressions, and creating scripts or rules when having a conversation with someone.

Diagnostic neglect and its repercussions on girls

The diagnostic criteria for people with the Autism Spectrum Disorder (ASD) are standardized to expressions of traits that are mainly presented in biologically male individuals. A wholly biomedical lens cannot account for the disparity in gender socialization for people with ASD which affects the expression of autism within biological men and women. The diagnostic elements are built upon the traits exhibited by men with ASD, such as having a reduced theory of mind to perceive empathy – traits that women with ASD have capitalized upon and learnt in order to traverse through a world that they do not understand or have the means of comprehending. Subsequently leading to an increase of misdiagnoses or diagnosis' late on in life amongst women with ASD. The inability to differentiate and develop tools to meet a new standard on diagnosing can actively harm women as they will not have the means to access the needed aid in education, medicine and daily life. Accommodations that would reduce mental strain off of women from 'masking' or 'camouflaging' consistently. Diagnostic tools should incorporate varied standards culturally as well as for different genders as it currently is ethnocentric towards the Western world, overlooking treatment and diagnosis for people of colour and of differing cultures.

==== Downfalls of camouflaging ====
Studies have shown that high levels of camouflaging can lead to higher levels of anxiety and depression and can increase the risk of suicidal ideation. Studies have also found that camouflaging can lead to a skewed sense of self. This is especially the case for people who had been masking and mimicking other people for long periods of time. Another factor of masking is mental and physical exhaustion after a camouflaging session. According to the participants of the Hull, et al (2017) study, the longer that autistic individuals camouflage, the worse the exhaustion becomes and the longer these individuals need to rest and recharge. This study also found that there were increased amounts of anxiety and stress revolving around camouflaging because the participants were often worried that they did not mask enough, did not mask correctly, or did not reach the desired effects of masking in that camouflaging session. Another one of the factors that increased anxiety and exhaustion while camouflaging is the fact that it "involved a constant monitoring of the situation, as if training oneself in self-monitoring, self-awareness, and monitoring others' reactions, both during and after the interaction occurred."

== Differences in gender and sexuality identification ==
Growing literature suggests a higher diversity of gender identities and sexual orientations in autistic populations as compared to neurotypical populations.

A study looking at the co-occurrence of ASD in patients with gender dysphoria found 7.8% of patients to be on the autism spectrum. Another study consisting of online surveys that included those who identified as non-binary and those identifying as transgender without diagnoses of gender dysphoria found the number to be as high as 24% of gender diverse people having autism, versus around 5% of the surveyed cisgender people. A possible hypothesis for the correlation may be that autistic people are less willing or able to conform to societal norms, which may explain the high number of autistic individuals who identify outside the stereotypical gender binary. As of yet, there have been no studies specifically addressing the occurrence of autism in intersex individuals.

Literature from the early 21st century suggests that 11% of people who are gender dysphoric or gender incongruent are autistic. Many theories exist regarding the suggested link between gender diversity and autism: Vanderlaan et al. proposed that a high birth weight could be the determinant of this co-occurrence, but this idea is challenged by its association with lower fetal testosterone, contradicting other autism theories such as Baron-Cohen's Extreme Male Brain hypothesis. Social theories, such as Gallucci et al. (2005) and Tateno et al. (2008), argue that individuals with autism may experience gender diversity as a way to avoid conventional sexual relationships or as a result of peer harassment. Psychologically, early theories from Landén et al. (1997) and Williams (1996) linked transidentity in autistic individuals to restricted interests or obsessive preoccupations, though these ideas have largely been refuted. Criticisms of these theories often focus on their reliance on insufficient evidence and their failure to fully capture the complexity of both gender identity and autism.

There has been a distinctive connection between Autism Spectrum Disorder (ASD) and gender since the inception of the diagnosis, and hence, following the modern popularity of diversity of gender expression, discussion has expanded to consider the ways in which 'traditional' understanding of gendered effects on autism may differ in application to gender diverse people. The dialogue surrounding the topic can largely be derived from the relatively frequent overlap between ASD and those who identify as transgender or non-binary, thereby posing the question of how the social reception of ASD may affect the gender construct. Certain narratives portray the correlation as one of social isolation, that individuals who experience inclusion in neither typical masculine nor feminine experiences may sooner reflect on their gender identity than those who have had that inclusionary experience. Many gender diverse people, and women, who have been diagnosed with ASD correspondingly report that they experienced a sense of unfamiliarity with themselves and abided by whatever they believed they 'should be' in order to experience this social inclusion. Many Autistic individuals often experience gender as a role to be studied and consciously followed, rather than naturally identifying with it, using it to conceal autistic traits to fit in with neurotypical people. Such pressure to conform to a social understanding of 'masculine' or 'feminine' may see these individuals with ASD hold resentment to the greater society for its perceived unwillingness to accommodate differences, this is similarly seen in cis-gender people with ASD regarding cultural attitudes towards other symptoms of ASD.

While more research is needed, current literature suggests that there is a link between autistic traits and non-heterosexuality within both neurotypical and autistic samples. This relationship is especially prevalent in autistic women.

== See also ==
- Autism and LGBTQ identities
- Autism Diagnostic Interview
- Broader autism phenotype, having some autistic traits but not meeting the full diagnostic criteria
- Epidemiology of autism
- Gender-bias in medical diagnosis § Psychological diagnosis
- Mental disorders and gender
- Sex differences in schizophrenia
- Mortality of autistic individuals
