= Mechanism of autism =

Biological processes that may contribute to autism

The mechanisms of autism are the molecular and cellular processes believed to cause or contribute to the symptoms of autism. Multiple processes are hypothesized to explain different autistic features. These hypotheses include defects in synapse structure and function, reduced synaptic plasticity, disrupted neural circuit function, gut–brain axis dyshomeostasis, neuroinflammation, and altered brain structure or connectivity. Autism symptoms stem from maturation-related changes in brain systems. The mechanisms of autism are divided into two main areas: pathophysiology of brain structures and processes, and neuropsychological linkages between brain structures and behaviours, with multiple pathophysiologies linked to various autism behaviours.

Evidence suggests gut–brain axis abnormalities may contribute to autism. Studies propose that immune, gastrointestinal inflammation, autonomic nervous system dysfunction, gut microbiota alterations, and dietary metabolites may contribute to brain neuroinflammation and dysfunction. Additionally, enteric nervous system abnormalities could play a role in neurological disorders by allowing disease pathways from the gut to impact the brain.

Synaptic dysfunction also appears to be implicated in autism, with some mutations disrupting synaptic pathways involving cell adhesion. Evidence points to teratogens affecting the early developmental stages, suggesting autism arises very early, possibly within the first eight weeks after conception.

Neuroanatomical studies support that autism may involve abnormal neuronal growth and pruning, leading to brain enlargement in some areas and reduction in others. Functional neuroimaging studies show reduced activation in somatosensory cortices during theory of mind tasks in autistic individuals and highlight potential imbalances in neurotransmitters like glutamate and γ-aminobutyric acid that may underlie autism's behavioural manifestations.

== Pathophysiology ==
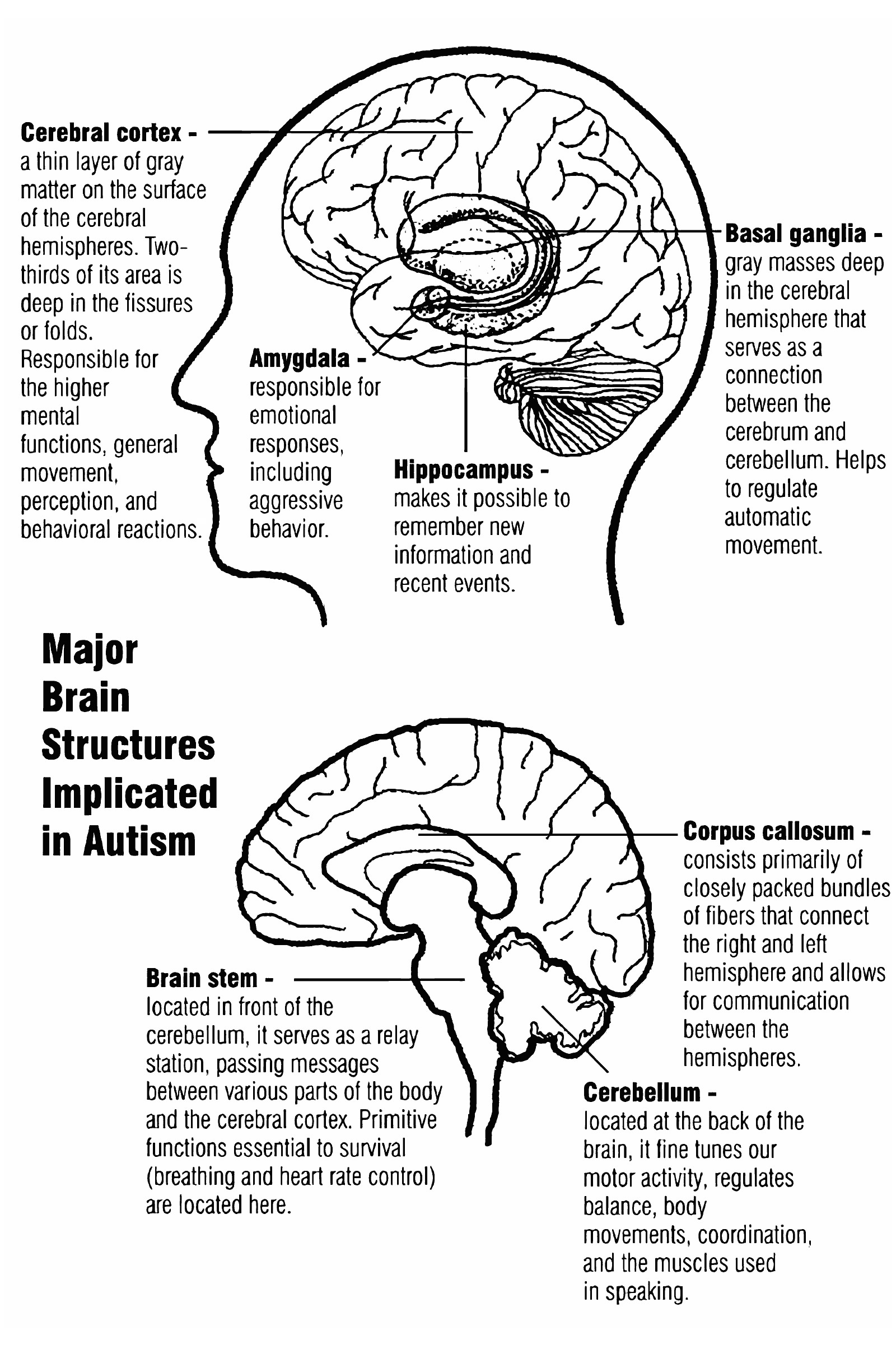
The amygdala, cerebellum, and many other brain regions have been implicated in autism.

Unlike some brain disorders which have clear molecular hallmarks that can be observed in every affected individual, such as Alzheimer's disease or Parkinson's disease, autism does not have a unifying mechanism at the molecular, cellular, or systems level. The autism spectrum may comprise a small set of disorders that converge on a few common molecular pathways, or it may be a large set of disorders with diverse mechanisms. Autism appears to result from developmental factors that affect many or all functional brain systems. Some factors may disturb the timing of brain development rather than the final product.

Listed below are some characteristic findings in ASD brains on molecular and cellular levels regardless of the specific genetic variation or mutation contributing to autism in a particular individual:

- Limbic system with smaller neurons that are more densely packed together. Given that the limbic system is the main centre of emotions and memory in the human brain, this observation may explain social impairment in ASD.
- Fewer and smaller Purkinje neurons in the cerebellum. New research suggest a role of the cerebellum in emotional processing and language.
- Increased number of astrocytes and microglia in the cerebral cortex. These cells provide metabolic and functional support to neurons and act as immune cells in the nervous system, respectively.
- Increased brain size in early childhood causing macrocephaly in 15–20% of ASD individuals. The brain size however normalizes by mid-childhood. This variation in brain size in not uniform in the ASD brain with some parts like the frontal and temporal lobes being larger, some like the parietal and occipital lobes being normal sized, and some like cerebellar vermis, corpus callosum, and basal ganglia being smaller than neurotypical individuals.
- Cell adhesion molecules that are essential to formation and maintenance of connections between neurons, neuroligins found on postsynaptic neurons that bind presynaptic cell adhesion molecules, and proteins that anchor cell adhesion molecules to neurons are all found to be mutated in ASD.
- Loss of function (LoF) mutations in genes relating to the function and development of the synapse. Some of those implicated include SHANK3, SCN2A, and PTEN.

=== Brain growth ===
Neuroanatomical studies and the association between autism and teratogens strongly suggest that autism affects brain development soon after conception. This anomaly appears to start a cascade of pathological events in the brain that are significantly influenced by environmental factors. Just after birth, the brains of children with autism tend to grow faster than usual, followed by normal or relatively slower growth in childhood. It is unknown whether early brain overgrowth occurs in all children with autism. It appears to be most prominent in the frontal and temporal lobes, which are associated with higher cognitive specializations such as social cognition, and language development. Hypotheses for the cellular and molecular bases of pathological early overgrowth include an excess of neurons that causes local overconnectivity in key brain regions, and disturbed neuronal migration during early gestation.

=== Synapse dysfunction ===
Synapse and dendritic spine growth may be disrupted in autism due to impaired neurexin–neuroligin cell-adhesion signaling or dysregulated synthesis of synaptic proteins. Disrupted synaptic development may also contribute to epilepsy, which may explain why the two conditions are associated. Studies have shown that imbalances between excitation and inhibition (EI) in brain circuitry is the primary cause of synaptic dysfunction in autism. Major Histocompatibility Class I (MHCI) antigens and inflammatory cytokines may be responsible for regulating the EI balance by impacting synapse development and plasticity.

Neurotransmitters such as serotonin, dopamine, and glutamate have been implicated in autism. The dysregulation of neurotransmitters and neuropeptides can contribute to pathophysiology and symptoms of autism. Fragile X, the most common genetic cause of autism, is linked to dysfunction of group I metabotropic glutamate receptors (mGluR), leading some to consider their potential role in autism.

=== Altered circuit connectivity ===
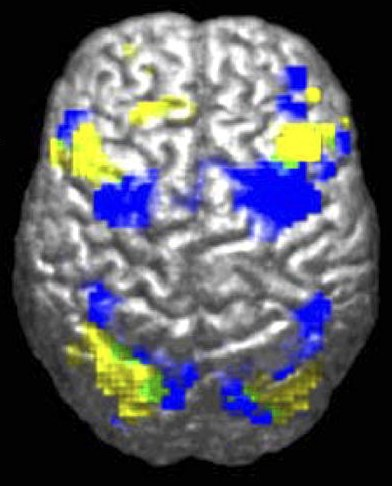
Autistic individuals tend to use different brain areas (yellow) for a movement task compared to a control group (blue).

The underconnectivity theory of autism posits that autistic people tend to have fewer high-level neural connections and less global synchronization, along with an excess of low-level processes. Functional connectivity studies have found both hypo- and hyperconnectivity in brains of autistic people. Hypoconnectivity is commonly observed for interhemispheric (e.g. lower neuron density in corpus callosum) and cortico-cortical functional connectivity. Some studies have found local overconnectivity in the cerebral cortex and weak functional connections between the frontal lobe and the rest of the cortex. Abnormal default mode network (task-negative) connectivity is often observed. Toggling between task-negative network activation and task-positive network activation (consisting of the dorsal attention network and salience network) may be less efficient, possibly reflecting a disturbance of self-referential thought. Such patterns of low function and aberrant activation in the brain may depend on whether the brain is performing social or nonsocial tasks.

Some studies have suggested that autism is a disorder of the association cortex. Event-related potentials with respect to attention, orientation to auditory and visual stimuli, novelty detection, language and face processing, and information storage are altered in autistic individuals; several studies have found a preference for nonsocial stimuli. Magnetoencephalography studies have observed delayed processing of auditory signals in autistic children.

The mirror neuron system (MNS) theory of autism hypothesizes that disrupted development of the MNS impairs autistic people's ability to imitate others, leading to core autistic features of social impairment and communication difficulties. In animals, the MNS activates when an animal performs an action or observes another animal perform the same action. The MNS may contribute to an individual's understanding of other people by enabling the modeling of their behavior via embodied simulation of their actions, intentions, and emotions. Several studies have tested this hypothesis by demonstrating structural abnormalities in MNS regions of individuals with ASD, delay in the activation in the core circuit for imitation in individuals with ASD, and a correlation between reduced MNS activity and severity of the syndrome in children with ASD. However, individuals with autism also have abnormal brain activation in many circuits outside the MNS and the MNS theory does not explain the normal performance of children with autism on imitation tasks that involve a goal or object.

Common copy number variation associations have suggested similarities between the mechanisms of autism and schizophrenia. For loci such as 16p11.2, 16p13.1, 22p11, and 22q13, deletion is associated with autism whereas duplication is associated with schizophrenia. Conversely, 1q21.1 and 22p11.2 duplication is associated with autism and deletion with schizophrenia.

It has been observed that people with ASD tend to have preferential processing of information on the left hemisphere compared to the right. The left hemisphere is associated with processing information related to details whereas the right hemisphere is associated with processing information in a more global and integrated sense that is essential for pattern recognition. For example, visual information like face recognition is normally processed by the right hemisphere which tends to integrate all information from an incoming sensory signal, whereas an ASD brain preferentially processes visual information in the left hemisphere where information tends to be processed for local details of the face rather than the overall configuration of the face. This left lateralization negatively impacts both facial recognition and spatial skills.

=== Inflammation ===
The immune system is thought to play an important role in autism. Children with autism have been found by researchers to have inflammation of both the peripheral and central immune systems as indicated by increased levels of pro-inflammatory cytokines and significant activation of microglia. Biomarkers of abnormal immune function have also been associated with increased impairments in behaviors that are characteristic of the core features of autism such as deficits in social interactions and communication. Interactions between the immune system and the nervous system begin early during the embryonic stage of life, and successful neurodevelopment depends on a balanced immune response. It is thought that activation of a pregnant mother's immune system such as from environmental toxicants or infection can contribute to causing autism through causing a disruption of brain development. This is supported by recent studies that have found that infection during pregnancy is associated with an increased risk of autism.

Some evidence suggests that gut–brain axis abnormalities may be involved by means of impaired serotonin signaling and inflammation. A 2015 review proposed that immune dysregulation, gastrointestinal inflammation, autonomic nervous system malfunction, gut microbiota alterations, and food metabolites may cause brain neuroinflammation and dysfunction. A 2016 review concluded that enteric nervous system abnormalities might play a role in neurological disorders such as autism.

=== Metabolism ===
Some data suggests neuronal overgrowth observed in autism may be caused by an increase in several growth hormones or impaired regulation of growth factor receptors. Some inborn errors of metabolism are associated with autism, but probably account for less than 5% of cases, although the precedence of this varies internationally with levels of consanguinity and it is thought to present its own endophenotype. Medical evidence has shown that autistic patients often present with abnormalities in glutathione-dependant redox metabolism, mitochondrial disorders, glucose 6 phosphate deficiency, Phenylketonuria and Propionic Acidemia among other metabolic abnormalities. Commonalities between both the genetic and epigenetic factors causing these metabolic disorders, and autism, are considered to be a potential reason for the high levels of comorbid presentation of autism in patients with a metabolic disorder. Many of the metabolic disorders implicated in autism also share a high degree of comorbidity to learning disabilities and other behavioural and neuropsychiatric concerns, most notably, catatonia (see also, catatonic autism), psychosis (see also, schizophrenia and autism) and depression.

=== Brain connectivity ===
Brains of autistic individuals have been observed to have abnormal connectivity and the degree of these abnormalities directly correlates with the severity of autism. Following are some observed abnormal connectivity patterns in autistic individuals:

- Decreased connectivity between different specialized regions of the brain (e.g. lower neuron density in corpus callosum) and relative over-connectivity within specialized regions of the brain by adulthood. Connectivity between different regions of the brain ('long-range' connectivity) is important for integration and global processing of information and comparing incoming sensory information with the existing model of the world within the brain. Connections within each specialized regions ('short-range' connections) are important for processing individual details and modifying the existing model of the world within the brain to more closely reflect incoming sensory information. In infancy, children at high risk for autism that were later diagnosed with autism were observed to have abnormally high long-range connectivity which then decreased through childhood to eventual long-range under-connectivity by adulthood.
- Abnormal preferential processing of information by the left hemisphere of the brain vs. preferential processing of information by right hemisphere in neurotypical individuals. The left hemisphere is associated with processing information related to details whereas the right hemisphere is associated with processing information in a more global and integrated sense that is essential for pattern recognition. For example, visual information like face recognition is normally processed by the right hemisphere which tends to integrate all information from an incoming sensory signal, whereas an ASD brain preferentially processes visual information in the left hemisphere where information tends to be processed for local details of the face rather than the overall configuration of the face. This left lateralization negatively impacts both facial recognition and spatial skills.
- Increased functional connectivity within the left hemisphere which directly correlates with severity of autism. This observation also supports preferential processing of details of individual components of sensory information over global processing of sensory information in an ASD brain.
- Prominent abnormal connectivity in the frontal and occipital regions. In autistic individuals low connectivity in the frontal cortex was observed from infancy through adulthood. This is in contrast to long-range connectivity which is high in infancy and low in adulthood in ASD. Abnormal neural organization is also observed in the Broca's area which is important for speech production.

=== Gut-immune-brain axis ===
46% to 84% of autistic individuals have gastrointestinal-related problems like reflux, diarrhea, constipation, inflammatory bowel disease, and food allergies. It has been observed that the makeup of gut bacteria in autistic people is different than that of non-autistic individuals which has raised the question of influence of gut bacteria on ASD development via inducing an inflammatory state. Listed below are some research findings on the influence of gut bacteria and abnormal immune responses on brain development:

- Some studies on rodents have shown gut bacteria influencing emotional functions and neurotransmitter balance in the brain, both of which are impacted in ASD.
- The immune system is thought to be the intermediary that modulates the influence of gut bacteria on the brain. Some ASD individuals have a dysfunctional immune system with higher numbers of some types of immune cells, biochemical messengers and modulators, and autoimmune antibodies. Increased inflammatory biomarkers correlate with increased severity of ASD symptoms, and there is some evidence to support a state of chronic brain inflammation in ASD.
- More pronounced inflammatory responses to bacteria were found in ASD individuals with an abnormal gut microbiota. Additionally, immunoglobulin A antibodies that are central to gut immunity were also found in elevated levels in ASD populations. Some of these antibodies may attack proteins that support myelination of the brain, a process that is important for robust transmission of neural signal in many nerves.
- Activation of the maternal immune system during pregnancy (by gut bacteria, bacterial toxins, an infection, or non-infectious causes) and gut bacteria in the mother that induce increased levels of Th17, a pro-inflammatory immune cell, have been associated with an increased risk of autism. Some maternal IgG antibodies that cross the placenta to provide passive immunity to the fetus can also attack the fetal brain.
- It is proposed that inflammation within the brain promoted by inflammatory responses to harmful gut microbiome impacts brain development.
- Pro-inflammatory cytokines IFN-γ, IFN-α, TNF-α, IL-6 and IL-17 have been shown to promote autistic behaviors in animal models. Giving anti-IL-6 and anti-IL-17 along with IL-6 and IL-17, respectively, have been shown to negate this effect in the same animal models.
- Some gut proteins and microbial products can cross the blood–brain barrier and activate mast cells in the brain. Mast cells release pro-inflammatory factors and histamine which further increase blood–brain barrier permeability and help set up a cycle of chronic inflammation.

=== Social brain interconnectivity ===
A number of discrete brain regions and networks among regions that are involved in dealing with other people have been discussed together under the rubric of the social brain. As of 2012, there is a consensus that autism spectrum is likely related to problems with interconnectivity among these regions and networks, rather than problems with any specific region or network.

=== Temporal lobe ===
Functions of the temporal lobe are related to many of the deficits observed in individuals with ASDs, such as receptive language, social cognition, joint attention, action observation, and empathy. The temporal lobe also contains the superior temporal sulcus and the fusiform face area, which may mediate facial processing. It has been argued that dysfunction in the superior temporal sulcus underlies the social deficits that characterize autism. Compared to neurotypical individuals, one study found that individuals with high-functioning autism had reduced activity in the fusiform face area when viewing pictures of faces.

=== Mitochondria ===
ASD could be linked to mitochondrial disease, a basic cellular abnormality with the potential to cause disturbances in a wide range of body systems. A 2012 meta-analysis study, as well as other population studies show that approximately 5% of autistic children meet the criteria for classical mitochondrial dysfunction. It is unclear why this mitochondrial disease occurs, considering that only 23% of children with both ASD and mitochondrial disease present with mitochondrial DNA abnormalities.

=== Serotonin ===
Serotonin is a major neurotransmitter in the nervous system and contributes to formation of new neurons (neurogenesis), formation of new connections between neurons (synaptogenesis), remodelling of synapses, and survival and migration of neurons, processes that are necessary for a developing brain and some also necessary for learning in the adult brain. 45% of ASD individuals have been found to have increased blood serotonin levels. Abnormalities in the serotonin transporter have also been found in ASD individuals. It has been hypothesized that increased activity of serotonin in the developing brain may facilitate the onset of ASD, with an association found in six out of eight studies between the use of selective serotonin reuptake inhibitors (SSRIs) by the pregnant mother and the development of ASD in the child exposed to SSRI in the antenatal environment.

The study could not definitively conclude SSRIs caused the increased risk for ASD due to the biases found in those studies, and the authors called for more definitive, better conducted studies. Confounding by indication has since then been shown to be likely. However, it is also hypothesized that SSRIs may help reduce symptoms of ASD and even positively affect brain development in some ASD patients.

=== Reduced NMDA‐receptor function ===
Reduced NMDA receptor function has been linked to reduced social interactions, locomotor hyperactivity, self-injury, prepulse inhibition (PPI) deficits, and sensory hypersensitivity, among others. Results suggest that NMDA dysregulation could contribute to core ASD symptoms.

=== Abnormal folate metabolism ===
Several lines of evidence indicate abnormalities of folate metabolism in ASD. These abnormalities can lead to a decrease in 5-methyltetrahydrofolate production, alter the production of folate metabolites and reduce folate transport across the blood-brain barrier and in neurons. The most significant abnormalities of folate metabolism associated with ASD may be autoantibodies to the alpha folate receptor (FRα). These autoantibodies have been associated with cerebral folate deficiency. Autoantibodies can bind to FRα and greatly impair its function.

In 2013, one study reported that 60% and 44% of 93 children with ASD were positive for FRα-blocking and binding autoantibodies, respectively. This high rate of anti-FRα autoantibody positivity was confirmed by Ramaekers et al. who compared 75 children with ASD to 30 non-autistic "controls". These controls were children who had a developmental delay, but did not have ASD. FRα-blocking autoantibodies were positive in 47% of children with ASD, but only in 3% of children without ASD. The authors of this study (RE Frye, JM Sequeira, EV Quadros, SJ James and DA Rossignol) have contributed to other such studies on FRα autoantibodies with similar results, however are considered to have a conflict of interest by the publishers.

Many children with ASD and cerebral folate deficiency have marked improvements in their clinical status when taking folinic acid.

Five children with cerebral folate deficiency and low functioning autism with neurological deficits found a complete reduction of ASD symptoms with the use of folinic acid in a child and substantial improvements in communication in two other children.

=== Abnormal redox metabolism ===
An imbalance in glutathione-dependent redox metabolism has been shown to be associated with autism spectrum disorder (ASD). Glutathione synthesis and intracellular redox balance are related to folate metabolism and methylation, metabolic pathways that have also been shown to be abnormal in ASD. Together, these metabolic abnormalities define a distinct endophenotype of TSA closely associated with genetic, epigenetic and mitochondrial abnormalities, as well as environmental factors related to ASD. Glutathione is involved in neuroprotection against oxidative stress and neuroinflammation by improving the antioxidant stress system.

In autistic children, studies have shown that glutathione metabolism can be improved.

- Subcutaneously by injection of methylcobalamin, a form of B12
- Oral folinic acid
- A vitamin and mineral supplement that includes antioxidants, coenzyme Q10 and vitamins B
- Tetrahydrobiopterin

Interestingly, recent DBPC studies have shown that N-acetyl-1-cysteine, a glutathione precursor supplement, is effective in improving the symptoms and behaviours associated with ASD. However, glutathione was not measured in these studies.

Small, medium and large DPBC trials and open small and medium-sized clinical trials demonstrate that new treatments for children with ASD for oxidative stress are associated with improvements in baseline symptoms of ASD, sleep, gastrointestinal symptoms, hyperactivity, seizures and parental impression, sensory and motor symptoms. These new treatments include N-acetyl-l-cysteine, methylcobalamin with and without oral folinic acid, vitamin C, and a vitamin and mineral supplement that includes antioxidants, enzyme Q10, and B vitamins.

Several other treatments that have antioxidant properties, including carnosine, have also been reported to significantly improve ASD behaviours, suggesting that treatment of oxidative stress could be beneficial for children with ASD. Many antioxidants can also help improve mitochondrial function, suggesting that clinical improvements with antioxidants could occur through a reduction in oxidative stress and an improvement in mitochondrial function.

Some of these treatments can have frequent serious side effects such as bronchospasm.

== Neuropsychology ==
Two major types of cognitive theories have been proposed to explain links between autistic brains and behaviour.

=== Social cognition theories ===
Social cognition theories focuses on deficits in social cognition. Simon Baron-Cohen's empathizing–systemizing theory postulates that autistic individuals can systemize, by developing internal rules of operation to handle events inside the brain, but are less effective at empathizing, by handling events generated by other agents. An extension, the extreme male brain theory, hypothesizes that autism is an extreme case of the male brain, defined psychometrically as individuals where systemizing is better than empathizing. These theories are somewhat related to Baron-Cohen's earlier theory of mind approach, which hypothesizes that autistic behaviour arises from an inability to ascribe mental states to oneself and others. The theory of mind hypothesis is supported by the atypical responses of children with autism to the Sally–Anne test for reasoning about others' motivations, and the mirror neuron system theory of autism described in Pathophysiology maps well to the hypothesis. However, most studies have found no evidence of impairment in autistic individuals' ability to understand other people's basic intentions or goals; instead, data suggests that impairments are found in understanding more complex social emotions or in considering others' viewpoints.

=== Nonsocial cognition theories ===
Nonsocial cognition theories focuses on nonsocial or general processing: the executive functions such as working memory, planning, and inhibition. In his review, Kenworthy states that "the claim of executive dysfunction as a causal factor in autism is controversial", however, "it is clear that executive dysfunction plays a role in the social and cognitive deficits observed in individuals with autism". Tests of core executive processes such as eye movement tasks indicate improvement from late childhood to adolescence, but performance never reaches typical adult levels. A strength of this theory is predicting stereotyped behavior and narrow interests; two weaknesses are that executive function is hard to measure and that executive function deficits have not been found in young children with autism.

=== Weak central coherence theory ===
Weak central coherence theory hypothesizes that a limited ability to see the big picture underlies the central disturbance in autism. One strength of this theory is predicting special talents and peaks in performance in autistic people. Another theory, enhanced perceptual functioning, focuses more on the superiority of locally oriented and perceptual operations in autistic individuals. Yet another theory, monotropism, posits that autism stems from a different cognitive style, tending to focus attention and processing resources intensely, to the exclusion of other stimuli. These theories map well from the underconnectivity theory of autism.

=== Issues with theories ===
No single type of theory is satisfactory on its own; social cognition theories poorly address autism's rigid and repetitive behaviors, while most of the nonsocial theories have difficulty explaining autism's social impairment and communication difficulties. A combined theory based on multiple deficits may prove to be more useful.

== See also ==
- Animal model of autism
- Causes of autism
