= Craig Newschaffer =

Craig J. Newschaffer
- Education: Boston University, Johns Hopkins University, Harvard University
- Known for: Research on modifiable autism risk factors
- Scientific career
- Fields: Autism
- Workplaces: Drexel University
- Thesis: Comorbidity and mortality in elderly breast cancer patients (1996)

Craig J. Newschaffer is the Raymond E. and Erin Stuart Schultz Dean and Professor of Biobehavioral Health at the College of Health and Human Development, Pennsylvania State University.

== Education ==
Newschaffer holds bachelor's degrees in biology and public relations from Boston University (1984), an SM in Health Policy and Management from the Harvard University School of Public Health and a PhD in chronic disease epidemiology from Johns Hopkins University (1996).

== Career ==
Newschaffer was formerly the founding director of Drexel University's AJ Drexel Autism Institute and served as Associate Dean for Research at Drexel University. He was also past Professor and Chairman of the Department of Epidemiology and Biostatistics at the Dornsife School. Earlier in his career he was an Associate Professor of Epidemiology at the Johns Hopkins Bloomberg School of Public Health where he founded the Center for Autism and Developmental Disabilities Epidemiology (now the Wendy Klag Center for Autism and Developmental Disabilities).

In 2025, he became the Raymond E. and Erin Stuart Schultz Dean and Professor of Biobehavioral Health at the College of Health and Human Development, Pennsylvania State University.

== Research ==
Newschaffer studies the epidemiology of autism. He has been one of the initial site principal investigators on several major autism epidemiology multisite research efforts, including the ADDM Network, the SEED study, and the ECHO program. He also was the principal director of the "EARLI" study, which followed mothers of children with autism beginning at the start of subsequent pregnancies, given that these mothers are known to be at a higher risk of having another autistic child. Newschaffer served as associate editor of the American Journal of Epidemiology and the Journal of Autism Research as well as a term as Vice President of the International Society for Autism Research.

== Views on autism causes ==
With regard to the causes of autism, Newschaffer stated in an interview that while genetics plays an important role, that "there are going to be causal components that are nonheritable genetics, things that we refer to as environmental causes..." He has also, however, contended that the rise in autism prevalence is to a large extent due only to "increased community awareness, changes to the diagnostic approach among clinicians and shifting public policy," though he was more ambiguous about this in a 2005 interview, saying that he thought that "there currently is little strong evidence supporting either hypothesis (real risk versus diagnostic bias)...," a view he had expressed the previous year in an interview with The New York Times, saying that "a large chunk" of the rise in autism was due to broadening of the diagnostic criteria but that "The devil is in how big a chunk is that big chunk." Newschaffer has also contended that there is no link between vaccines and autism, saying, "Those studies just kept piling up that showed no association between MMR or thimerosal exposure and autism."
