= Lorazepam challenge =

Clinical diagnostic tool

The chemical structure of lorazepam

The lorazepam challenge is a diagnostic tool used in the clinical diagnosis of catatonia. Upon treatment with lorazepam, other benzodiazepines, or zolpidem, a rapid reversal of the catatonic state is often observed in catatonic patients. A positive response is usually defined as a 50% reduction in catatonic symptoms using a standardized scale. Response to lorazepam can support the diagnosis of catatonia and inform treatment strategy, although a minority may not respond to the challenge. The lorazepam challenge can elicit a false positive result when administered to patients afflicted with conditions that can sometimes mimic catatonia, such as benzodiazepine and alcohol withdrawal.

Lorazepam is preferred to other benzodiazepines and zolpidem due to its longer duration of action. An initial therapeutic effect typically occurs within 10–30 minutes of IV administration lorazepam at doses between 2–4 mg. Higher doses may be used in patients who show no response initially, to minimise the chance of a false negative result.

== Mechanism of action ==
The mechanism underlying rapid response to benzodiazepines and zolpidem in catatonia is unknown. The observation that zolpidem—a hypnotic with little to no muscle relaxing properties—elicits a challenge response similar to benzodiazepines has called into question the hypothesis that lorazepam may reverse catatonia through myorelaxation.
