= Causes of autism =

Complex interplay of factors

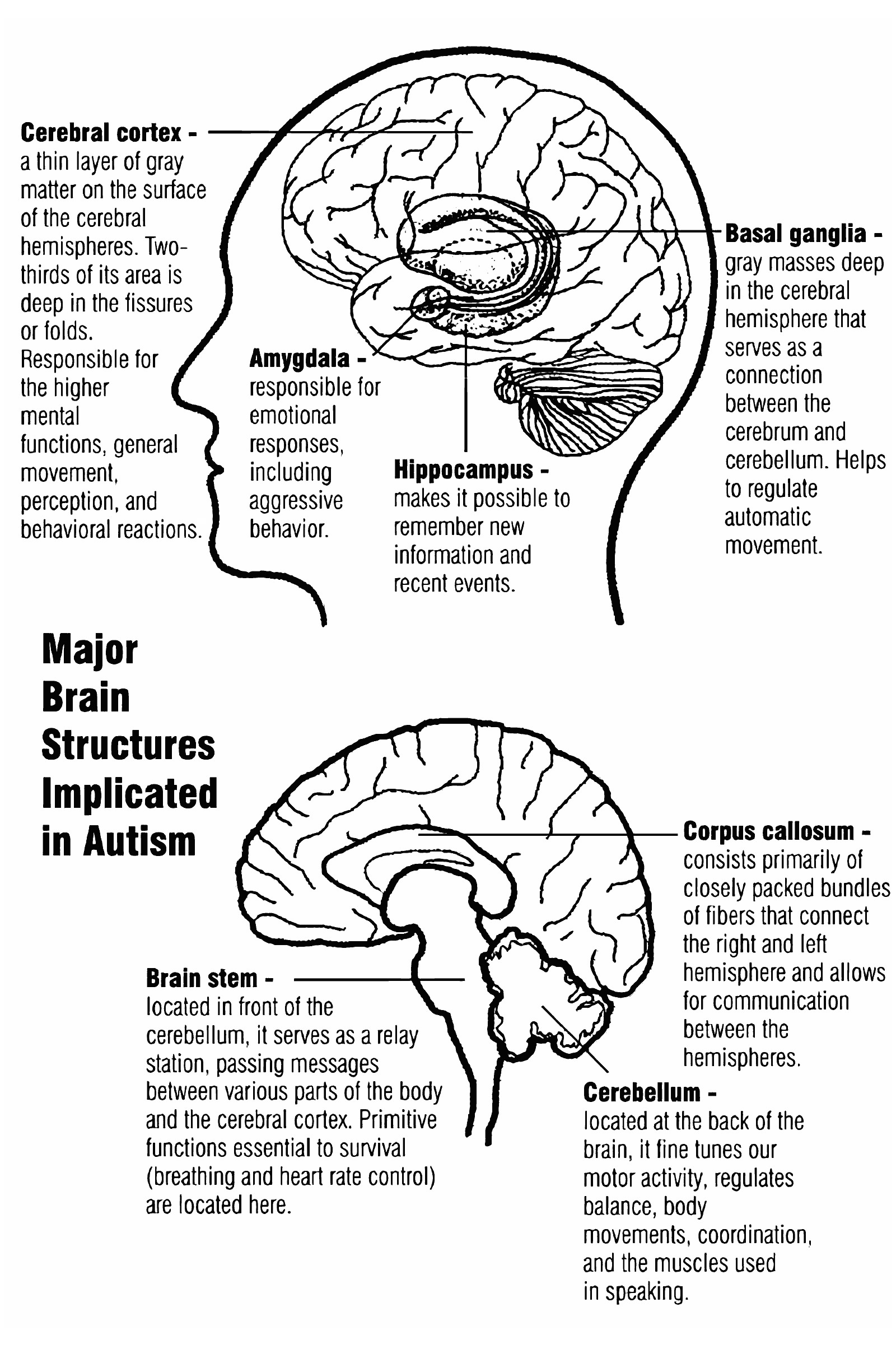
Brain sections related to autism

The causes of autism are a subject of scientific research, but understanding of the etiology of autism is incomplete. It is influenced by a complex interplay of genetic, epigenetic, prenatal, perinatal, and environmental factors. Genetics play a major role, with heritability estimates ranging from 60 to 90%. De novo mutations—including copy number variations and gene-disrupting mutations—contribute to approximately 30–40% of cases. However, most autism cases involve complex interactions among multiple inherited genetic variants, many of which are still unknown.

Epigenetic mechanisms, such as DNA methylation and genomic imprinting, also influence gene expression and susceptibility, often interacting with environmental exposures. In rare cases, autism has been associated with agents that cause birth defects.

Prenatal risk factors include advanced parental age, maternal metabolic or autoimmune disorders, infections, and prenatal stress, while perinatal risks involve preterm birth, low birth weight, and birth complications. Postnatal mechanisms have been proposed, including immune dysregulation, gastrointestinal abnormalities, oxidative stress, and neural circuit differences, though these remain largely unproven and are the focus of ongoing research. Some Neanderthal-derived genetic variants may influence susceptibility. Current high-quality evidence shows no causal link between prenatal use of paracetamol and autism.

Multiple hypotheses have been popularized amongst the general public and spread despite lack of evidence. Overwhelming scientific evidence shows no causal association between thiomersal and vaccines, including the measles-mumps-rubella (MMR) vaccine, and autism. Parental concern about vaccines has led to a decreasing uptake of childhood immunizations and an increasing likelihood of measles outbreaks. The refrigerator mother theory has also been conclusively refuted by scientific evidence.

== How causes are established ==
The causes of autism have been a subject of scientific research, but understanding of its etiology remains incomplete. The scientific discipline of epidemiology has been the major tool to hypothesize and evaluate genetic, epigenetic, prenatal, perinatal, and environmental factors.

== Genetics ==
Genetic factors may be the most significant cause of autism. Early studies of twins had estimated heritability to be over 90%, meaning that genetics explains over 90% of whether a child will develop autism. This may be an overestimation, as later twin studies estimate the heritability at between 60 and 90%. Evidence so far still suggests a strong genetic component, with one of the largest and most recent studies estimating the heritability at 83%. Many of the non-autistic co-twins had learning or social disabilities. For adult siblings, the probability of having one or more features constitutive of the broader autism phenotype may be as high as 30%.

In spite of the strong heritability, most cases of autism occur sporadically with no recent evidence of family history. It has been hypothesized that spontaneous de novo mutations in the sperm or egg contribute to the likelihood of developing autism. Additionally, mutations of the Fragile X Messenger Ribonucleoprotein 1 (FMR1) which cause fragile X syndrome, one of the most common causes of intellectual disability and autism, have been linked to the early cessation of reproductive functions of female carriers in the gene. This substantiates the notion that those with autism are more likely to be infertile, weakening the heritability of the disorder. Also, the likelihood of having a child develop autism generally increases with advancing parental age, and mutations in sperm gradually accumulate throughout a man's life.

The first genes to be definitively shown to contribute to autism were found in the early 1990s by researchers looking at gender-specific forms of autism caused by mutations on the X chromosome. An expansion of the CGG trinucleotide repeat in the promoter of the gene FMR1 in boys causes fragile X syndrome, and at least 20% of boys with this mutation have behaviors consistent with autism spectrum disorder. Mutations that inactivate the gene MECP2 cause Rett syndrome, which is associated with autistic behaviors in girls, and in boys the mutation is embryonic lethal.

Besides these early examples, the role of de novo mutations in autism first became evident when DNA microarray technologies reached sufficient resolution to allow the detection of copy number variation (CNV) in the human genome. CNVs are the most common type of structural variation in the genome, consisting of deletions and duplications of DNA that range in size from a kilobase to a few megabases. Microarray analysis has shown that de novo CNVs occur at a significantly higher rate in sporadic cases of autism as compared to the rate in their typically developing siblings and unrelated controls. A series of studies have shown that gene disrupting de novo CNVs occur approximately four times more frequently in autism than in controls and contribute to approximately 5–10% of cases. Based on these studies, there are predicted to be 130–234 autism-related CNV loci. The first whole genome sequencing study to comprehensively catalog de novo structural variation at a much higher resolution than DNA microarray studies has shown that the mutation rate is approximately 20% and not elevated in autism compared to sibling controls. Structural variants in individuals with autism are much larger and four times more likely to disrupt genes, mirroring findings from CNV studies.

CNV studies were closely followed by exome sequencing studies, which sequence the 1–2% of the genome that codes for proteins (the "exome"). These studies found that de novo gene inactivating mutations were observed in approximately 20% of individuals with autism, compared to 10% of unaffected siblings, suggesting the etiology of autism is driven by these mutations in around 10% of cases. There are predicted to be 350-450 genes that significantly increase susceptibility to autism when impacted by inactivating de novo mutations. A further 12% of cases are predicted to be caused by protein altering missense mutations that change an amino acid but do not inactivate a gene. Therefore, approximately 30% of individuals with autism have a spontaneous de novo large CNV that deletes or duplicates genes, or mutation that changes the amino acid code of an individual gene. A further 5–10% of cases have inherited structural variation at loci known to be associated with autism, and these known structural variants may arise de novo in the parents of affected children.

Tens of genes and CNVs have been definitively identified based on the observation of recurrent mutations in different individuals, and suggestive evidence has been found for over 100 others. The Simons Foundation Autism Research Initiative (SFARI) details the evidence for each genetic locus associated with autism.

These early gene and CNV findings have shown that the cognitive and behavioral features associated with each of the underlying mutations is variable. Each mutation is itself associated with a variety of clinical diagnoses, and can also be found in a small percentage of individuals with no clinical diagnosis. Thus the genetic disorders that comprise autism are not autism-specific. The mutations themselves are characterized by considerable variability in clinical outcome and typically only a subset of mutation carriers meet criteria for autism. This variable expressivity results in different individuals with the same mutation varying considerably in the severity of their observed particular trait.

The conclusion of these recent studies of de novo mutation is that the spectrum of autism is breaking up into quanta of individual disorders defined by genetics.

One gene that has been linked to autism is SHANK2. Mutations in this gene act in a dominant fashion and appear to cause hyperconnectivity between the neurons.

A study conducted on 42,607 autism cases has identified 60 new genes, five of which had a more moderate impact on autistic symptoms. The related gene variants were often inherited from the participant's parents.

== Epigenetics ==
Epigenetic mechanisms may increase the risk of autism. Epigenetic changes occur as a result not of DNA sequence changes but of chromosomal histone modification or modification of the DNA bases. Such modifications are known to be affected by environmental factors, including nutrition, drugs, and mental stress. Interest has been expressed in imprinted regions on chromosomes 15q and 7q.

Most data supports a polygenic, epistatic model, meaning that the disorder is caused by two or more genes and that those genes are interacting in a complex manner. Several genes, between two and fifteen in number, have been identified and could potentially contribute to disease susceptibility. An exact determination of the cause of ASD has yet to be discovered and there probably is not one single genetic cause of any particular set of disorders, leading many researchers to believe that epigenetic mechanisms, such as genomic imprinting or epimutations, may play a major role.

Epigenetic mechanisms can contribute to disease phenotypes. Epigenetic modifications include DNA cytosine methylation and post-translational modifications to histones. These mechanisms contribute to regulating gene expression without changing the sequence of the DNA and may be influenced by exposure to environmental factors and may be heritable from parents. Rett syndrome and fragile X syndrome (FXS) are single gene disorders related to autism with overlapping symptoms that include deficient neurological development, impaired language and communication, difficulties in social interactions, and stereotyped hand gestures. It is not uncommon for a patient to be diagnosed with both autism and Rett syndrome or FXS. Epigenetic regulatory mechanisms play the central role in pathogenesis of these two disorders.

Genomic imprinting may also contribute to the development of autism. Genomic imprinting is another example of epigenetic regulation of gene expression. In this instance, the epigenetic modification(s) causes the offspring to express the maternal copy of a gene or the paternal copy of a gene, but not both. The imprinted gene is silenced through epigenetic mechanisms. Candidate genes and susceptibility alleles for autism are identified using a combination of techniques, including genome-wide and targeted analyses of allele sharing in sib-pairs, using association studies and transmission disequilibrium testing (TDT) of functional or positional candidate genes and examination of novel and recurrent cytogenetic aberrations. Results from numerous studies have identified several genomic regions known to be subject to imprinting, candidate genes, and gene-environment interactions. Particularly, chromosomes 15q and 7q appear to be epigenetic hotspots in contributing to autism. Also, genes on the X chromosome may play an important role, as in Rett syndrome.

An important basis for autism causation is also the over- or underproduction of brain permanent cells (neurons, oligodendrocytes, and astrocytes) by the neural precursor cells during fetal development.

== Prenatal environment ==
The development of autism is associated with several prenatal risk factors, including advanced age in either parent, diabetes, bleeding, and maternal use of antibiotics and psychiatric drugs during pregnancy. Autism has been linked to birth defect agents acting during the first eight weeks from conception, though these cases are rare. If the mother of the child is dealing with autoimmune conditions or disorders while pregnant, it may have an effect on the child's development of autism. All of these factors can cause inflammation or impair immune signaling in one way or another.

=== Obstructive sleep apnea in pregnancy ===
Sleep apnea can result in intermittent hypoxia and has been increasing in prevalence due in part to the obesity epidemic. The known maternal risk factors for autism diagnosis in her offspring are similar to the risk factors for sleep apnea. For example, advanced maternal age, maternal obesity, maternal type 2 diabetes and maternal hypertension all increase the risk of autism in her offspring. Likewise, these are all known risk factors for sleep apnea.

One study found that gestational sleep apnea was associated with low reading test scores in children and that this effect may be mediated by an increased risk of the child having sleep apnea themselves. Another study reported low social development scores in 64% of infants born to mothers with sleep apnea compared to 25% of infants born to controls, suggesting sleep apnea in pregnancy may have an effect on offspring neurodevelopment. There was also an increase in the amount of snoring the mothers with sleep apnea reported in their infants when compared to controls. Children with sleep apnea have "hyperactivity, attention problems, aggressivity, lower social competency, poorer communication, and/or diminished adaptive skills". One study found significant improvements in ADHD-like symptoms, aggression, social problems and thought problems in autistic children who underwent adenotonsillectomy for sleep apnea. Sleep problems in autism have been linked in a study to brain changes, particularly in the hippocampus, though this study does not prove causation. A common presentation of sleep apnea in children with autism is insomnia. All known genetic syndromes which are linked to autism have a high prevalence of sleep apnea. The prevalence of sleep apnea in Down's Syndrome is 50% - 100%. Sleep problems and OSA in this population have been linked to language development. Since autism manifests in the early developmental period, sleep apnea in Down's Syndrome and other genetic syndromes such as Fragile X start early (at infancy or shortly after), and sleep disturbances alter brain development, it's plausible that some of the neurodevelopmental differences seen in these genetic syndromes are at least partially caused by the effects of untreated sleep apnea.

=== Infectious hypotheses ===
One hypothesis suggests that prenatal viral infection may contribute to the development of autism. Prenatal exposure to rubella or cytomegalovirus activates the mother's immune response and may greatly increase the risk for autism in mice. Congenital rubella syndrome is the most convincing environmental cause of autism. Infection-associated immunological events in early pregnancy may affect neural development more than infections in late pregnancy, not only for autism, but also for psychiatric disorders of presumed neurodevelopmental origin, notably schizophrenia.

A 2021 meta-analysis of 36 studies suggested a relationship between mothers recalling an infection during pregnancy and having children with autism.

=== Environmental agents ===
Teratogens are environmental agents that cause birth defects. Some agents that are theorized to cause birth defects have also been suggested as potential autism risk factors, although there is little to no scientific evidence to back such claims. These include exposure of the embryo to valproic acid, thalidomide or misoprostol. These cases are rare. Questions have also been raised whether ethanol (grain alcohol) increases autism risk, as part of fetal alcohol syndrome or alcohol-related birth defects. All known teratogens appear to act during the first eight weeks from conception, and though this does not exclude the possibility that autism can be initiated or affected later, it is strong evidence that autism arises very early in development.

=== Autoimmune and inflammatory diseases ===
Maternal inflammatory and autoimmune diseases can damage embryonic and fetal tissues, aggravating a genetic problem or damaging the nervous system.

=== Other maternal conditions ===
Thyroid problems that lead to thyroxine deficiency in the mother in weeks 8–12 of pregnancy have been postulated to produce changes in the fetal brain leading to autism. Thyroxine deficiencies can be caused by inadequate iodine in the diet, and by environmental agents that interfere with iodine uptake or act against thyroid hormones. Possible environmental agents include flavonoids in food, tobacco smoke, and most herbicides. This hypothesis has not been tested.

Diabetes during pregnancy is a significant risk factor for autism. Gestational diabetes doubles the risk that the baby will have autism. The mechanism by which this happens is unknown.

Maternal diagnoses of polycystic ovary syndrome was found to associated with higher risk of autism.

Maternal obesity during pregnancy may also increase the risk of autism, although further study is needed.

Maternal malnutrition during preconception and pregnancy influences fetal neurodevelopment. Intrauterine growth restriction is associated with autism, in both term and preterm infants.

=== Other in utero ===
It has been hypothesized that folic acid taken during pregnancy could play a role in reducing cases of autism by modulating gene expression through an epigenetic mechanism. This hypothesis is supported by multiple studies.

Prenatal stress, consisting of exposure to life events or environmental factors that distress an expectant mother, has been hypothesized to contribute to autism, possibly as part of a gene-environment interaction. Autism has been reported to be associated with prenatal stress both with retrospective studies that examined stressors such as job loss and family discord, and with natural experiments involving prenatal exposure to storms; animal studies have reported that prenatal stress can disrupt brain development and produce behaviors resembling symptoms of autism. Other studies cast doubt on this association, notably population based studies in England and Sweden finding no link between stressful life events and autism.

The fetal testosterone theory hypothesizes that higher levels of testosterone in the amniotic fluid of mothers pushes brain development towards improved ability to see patterns and analyze complex systems while diminishing communication and empathy, emphasizing "male" traits over "female", or in E-S theory terminology, emphasizing "systemizing" over "empathizing". One project has published several reports suggesting that high levels of fetal testosterone could produce behaviors relevant to those seen in autism.

Based in part on animal studies, diagnostic ultrasounds administered during pregnancy have been hypothesized to increase the child's risk of autism. This hypothesis is not supported by independently published research, and examination of children whose mothers received an ultrasound has failed to find evidence of harmful effects.

Some research suggests that maternal exposure to selective serotonin reuptake inhibitors during pregnancy is associated with an increased risk of autism, but it remains unclear whether there is a causal link between the two. There is evidence, for example, that this association may be an artifact of confounding by maternal mental illness.

=== Maternal alcohol consumption ===
A 2022 meta-analysis found no association between alcohol consumption during pregnancy and autism in offspring.

=== Maternal paracetamol use ===
On 24 September 2025, the World Health Organization stated there is no conclusive scientific evidence linking paracetamol (acetaminophen) use during pregnancy to autism.

Across multiple international health authorities, including the Society of Obstetricians and Gynaecologists of Canada, the Medicines and Healthcare products Regulatory Agency in the UK, and the European Medicines Agency, paracetemol is recommended as the first-line treatment for pain and fever during pregnancy when used at the lowest effective dose for the shortest duration. Current high-quality evidence shows no causal link between prenatal use and autism or other neurodevelopmental disorders, while untreated pain or fever poses risks to both mother and fetus.

In 2025, the United States Food and Drug Administration advised physicians to minimize routine acetaminophen use during pregnancy due to unproven links to autism and ADHD, while noting it remains the safest analgesic and antipyretic option in pregnancy compared to alternatives like aspirin and ibuprofen.

Very large population-based studies indicate that prenatal paracetamol use is not linked to autism, ADHD, or intellectual disability, and studies comparing siblings suggest that earlier reported links were likely due to other factors, not paracetemol itself.

== Perinatal environment ==
Autism is associated with some perinatal and obstetric conditions. Infants that are born pre-term often have various neurodevelopmental impairments related to motor skills, cognition, receptive and expressive language, and socio-emotional capabilities. Pre-term infants are also at a higher risk of having various neurodevelopmental disorders such as cerebral palsy and autism, as well as psychiatric disorders related to attention, anxiety, and impaired social communication. It has also been proposed that the functions of the hypothalamic-pituitary-adrenal axis and brain connectivity in pre-term infants may be affected by NICU-related stress resulting in deficits in emotional regulation and socio-emotional capabilities. A 2019 analysis of perinatal and neonatal risk factors found that autism was associated with abnormal fetal positioning, umbilical cord complications, low 5-minute Apgar score, low birth weight and gestation duration, fetal distress, meconium aspiration syndrome, trauma or injury during birth, maternal hemorrhaging, multiple birth, feeding disorders, neonatal anemia, birth defects/malformation, incompatibility with maternal blood type, and jaundice/hyperbilirubinemia. These associations do not denote a causal relationship for any individual factor. There is growing evidence that perinatal exposure to air pollution may be a risk factor for autism, although this evidence has methodological limitations, including a small number of studies and failure to control for potential confounding factors. One published paper concluded more study is needed of the association between autism and the use of paracetamol (acetaminophen) in infants and young children. This association does not necessarily demonstrate a causal relationship.

== Postnatal environment ==
A wide variety of postnatal contributors to autism have been proposed, including gastrointestinal or immune system abnormalities, allergies, and exposure of children to drugs, infection, certain foods, or heavy metals. The evidence for these risk factors is anecdotal and has not been confirmed by reliable studies.

=== Amygdala neurons ===
This theory hypothesizes that an early developmental failure involving the amygdala cascades on the development of cortical areas that mediate social perception in the visual domain. The fusiform face area of the ventral stream is implicated. The idea is that it is involved in social knowledge and social cognition, and that the deficits in this network are instrumental in causing autism.

=== Autoimmune disease ===
This theory hypothesizes that autoantibodies that target the brain or elements of brain metabolism may cause or exacerbate autism. It is related to the maternal infection theory, except that it postulates that the effect is caused by the individual's own antibodies, possibly due to an environmental trigger after birth. It is also related to several other hypothesized causes; for example, viral infection has been hypothesized to cause autism via an autoimmune mechanism.

Interactions between the immune system and the nervous system begin early during embryogenesis, and successful neurodevelopment depends on a balanced immune response. It is possible that aberrant immune activity during critical periods of neurodevelopment is part of the mechanism of some forms of autism. A small percentage of autism cases are associated with infection, usually before birth. Results from immune studies have been contradictory. Some abnormalities have been found in specific subgroups, and some of these have been replicated. It is not known whether these abnormalities are relevant to the pathology of autism, for example, by infection or autoimmunity, or whether they are secondary to the disease processes. As autoantibodies are found in diseases other than autism, and are not always present in autism, the relationship between immune disturbances and autism remains unclear and controversial. A 2015 systematic review and meta-analysis found that children with a family history of autoimmune diseases were at a greater risk of autism compared to children without such a history.

When an underlying maternal autoimmune disease is present, antibodies circulating to the fetus could contribute to the development of autism spectrum disorders.

=== Gastrointestinal connection ===
Gastrointestinal problems are one of the most commonly associated medical disorders in people with autism. These are linked to greater social impairment, irritability, behavior and sleep problems, language impairments and mood changes, so the theory that they are an overlap syndrome has been postulated. Studies indicate that gastrointestinal inflammation, food allergies, gluten-related disorders (celiac disease, wheat allergy, non-celiac gluten sensitivity), visceral hypersensitivity, dysautonomia and gastroesophageal reflux are the mechanisms that possibly link both.

A 2016 review concludes that enteric nervous system abnormalities might play a role in several neurological disorders, including autism. Neural connections and the immune system are a pathway that may allow diseases originated in the intestine to spread to the brain. A 2018 review suggests that the frequent association of gastrointestinal disorders and autism is due to abnormalities of the gut–brain axis.

The "leaky gut syndrome" hypothesis developed by Andrew Wakefield, known for his fraudulent study on another cause of autism, is popular among parents of children with autism. It is based on the idea that defects in the intestinal barrier produce an excessive increase in intestinal permeability, allowing substances present in the intestine (including bacteria, environmental toxins, and food antigens) to pass into the blood. The data supporting this theory are limited and contradictory, since both increased intestinal permeability and normal permeability have been documented in people with autism. Studies with mice provide some support to this theory and suggest the importance of intestinal flora, demonstrating that the normalization of the intestinal barrier was associated with an improvement in some of the autism-like behaviors. Studies on subgroups of people with autism showed the presence of high plasma levels of zonulin, a protein that regulates permeability opening the "pores" of the intestinal wall, as well as intestinal dysbiosis (reduced levels of Bifidobacteria and increased abundance of Akkermansia muciniphila, Escherichia coli, Clostridia and Candida fungi that promote the production of proinflammatory cytokines, all of which produces excessive intestinal permeability. This allows passage of bacterial endotoxins from the gut into the bloodstream, stimulating liver cells to secrete tumor necrosis factor alpha (TNFα), which modulates blood–brain barrier permeability. Studies on ASD people showed that TNFα cascades produce proinflammatory cytokines, leading to peripheral inflammation and activation of microglia in the brain, which indicates neuroinflammation. In addition, neuroactive opioid peptides from digested foods have been shown to leak into the bloodstream and permeate the blood–brain barrier, influencing neural cells and causing autistic symptoms. (See Endogenous opiate precursor theory)

After a preliminary 1998 study of three children with autism treated with secretin infusion reported improved GI function and dramatic improvement in behavior, many parents sought secretin treatment and a black market for the hormone developed quickly. Later studies found secretin clearly ineffective in treating autism.

=== Endogenous opiate precursor theory ===
In 1979, a possible association between autism and opioids was proposed, it was noted that injecting small amounts of opiates into young laboratory animals resulted in symptoms similar to those seen in autistic children. The possibility of a relationship between autism and the consumption of gluten and casein was first articulated by Kalle Reichelt in 1991.

Opiate theory hypothesizes that autism is the result of a metabolic disorder in which opioid peptides gliadorphin (aka gluteomorphin) and Casomorphin, produced through metabolism of gluten (present in wheat and related cereals) and casein (present in dairy products), pass through an abnormally permeable intestinal wall and then proceed to exert an effect on neurotransmission through binding with opioid receptors. It has been postulated that the resulting excess of opioids affects brain maturation and causes autistic symptoms including: behavioral difficulties, attention problems, and alterations in communicative capacity and social and cognitive functioning.

Although high levels of these opioids are eliminated in the urine, it has been suggested that a small part of them cross into the brain causing interference of signal transmission and disruption of normal activity. Three studies have reported that urine samples of people with autism show an increased 24-hour peptide excretion. A study with a control group found no appreciable differences in opioid levels in urine samples of people with autism compared to controls. Two studies showed an increased opioid levels in cerebrospinal fluid of people with autism.

The theory further states that removing opiate precursors from a child's diet may allow time for these behaviors to cease, and neurological development in very young children to resume normally. As of 2021, reliable studies have not demonstrated the benefit of gluten-free diets in the treatment of autism. In the subset of people who have gluten sensitivity there is limited evidence that suggests that a gluten-free diet may improve some autistic behaviors.

=== Nutrition-related factors ===
There have been multiple attempts to uncover a link between various nutritional deficiencies such as vitamin D and folate and autism risk. Although there have been many studies on the role of vitamin D in the development of autism, the majority of them are limited by their inability to assess the deficiency prior to an autism diagnosis. A meta-analysis on the association between vitamin D and autism found that individuals with autism had significantly low levels of serum 25-hydroxy vitamin D than those without autism. Another analysis showed significant differences in levels of zinc between individuals with and without autism. Although studies showed significant differences protein intake and calcium in individuals with autism, the results were limited by their imprecision, inconsistency, and indirect nature. Additionally, low levels of 5-methyltetrahydrofolate (5-MTHF) in the brain can result in cerebral folate deficiency (CFD) which has been shown to be associated with autism.

=== Toxic exposure ===
Multiple studies have attempted to study the relationship between toxic exposure and autism, despite limitations related to the measurement of toxic exposure the methods for which were often indirect and cross-sectional. Systematic reviews have been conducted for numerous toxins including air pollution, thimerosal, inorganic mercury, and levels of heavy metals in hair, nails, and bodily fluids.

Environmental exposure to inorganic mercury may be associated with higher autism risk, with high levels of mercury in the body being a valid disease-causing agent for autism.

Significant evidence has not been found of an association between autism and the concentration of copper, cadmium, selenium, and chromium in the hair, nails, and bodily fluids. Levels of lead were found to be significantly higher in individuals with autism. The precision and consistency of results were not maintained across studies and were influenced by an outlier study. The atypical eating behaviors of autistic children, along with habitual mouthing and pica, make it hard to determine whether increased lead levels are a cause or a consequence of autism.

=== Locus coeruleus–noradrenergic system ===
This theory hypothesizes that autistic behaviors depend at least in part on a developmental dysregulation that results in impaired function of the locus coeruleus–noradrenergic (LC-NA) system. The LC-NA system is heavily involved in arousal and attention; for example, it is related to the brain's acquisition and use of environmental cues.

=== Oxidative stress ===
Oxidative stress, oxidative DNA damage and disruptions of DNA repair have been postulated to play a role in the etiopathology of both ASD and schizophrenia. Physiological factors and mechanisms influence by oxidative stress are believed to be highly influential to autism risk. Interactions between environmental and genetic factors may increase oxidative stress in children with autism. This theory hypothesizes that toxicity and oxidative stress may cause autism in some cases. Evidence includes genetic effects on metabolic pathways, reduced antioxidant capacity, enzyme changes, and enhanced biomarkers for oxidative stress. One theory is that stress damages Purkinje cells in the cerebellum after birth, and it is possible that glutathione is involved. Polymorphism of genes involved metabolization of glutathione is evidenced by lower levels of total glutathione, and higher levels of oxidized glutathione in autistic children. Based on this theory, antioxidants may be a useful treatment for autism. Environmental factors can influence oxidative stress pre, peri, and postnatally and include heavy metals, infection, certain drugs, and toxic exposure from various sources including cigarette smoke, air pollutants, and organophosphate pesticides.

=== Social construct ===
Beyond the genetic, epigenetic, and biological factors that can contribute to an autism diagnosis are theories related to the "autistic identity". It has been theorized that perceptions towards the characteristics of autistic individuals have been heavily influenced by neurotypical ideologies and social norms.

The social construct theory says that the boundary between normal and abnormal is subjective and arbitrary, so autism does not exist as an objective entity, but only as a social construct. It further argues that autistic individuals themselves have a way of being that is partly socially constructed.

Mild and moderate variations of autism are particular targets of the theory that social factors determine what it means to be autistic. The theory hypothesizes that individuals with these diagnoses inhabit the identities that have been ascribed to them, and promote their sense of well-being by resisting or appropriating autistic ascriptions.

Lynn Waterhouse suggests that autism has been reified, in that social processes have endowed it with more reality than is justified by the scientific evidence.

Although social construction of the autistic identity can have a positive impact on the well-being and treatment of autistic individuals, that is not always the case when the individuals in question belong to historically marginalized populations.

=== Viral infection ===
Many studies have presented evidence for and against association of autism with viral infection after birth. Laboratory rats infected with Borna disease virus show some symptoms similar to those of autism but blood studies of autistic children show no evidence of infection by this virus. Members of the herpes virus family may have a role in autism, but the evidence so far is anecdotal. Viruses have long been suspected as triggers for immune-mediated diseases such as multiple sclerosis but showing a direct role for viral causation is difficult in those diseases, and mechanisms, whereby viral infections could lead to autism, are speculative.

== Evolutionary explanations ==
=== Neanderthal theory ===
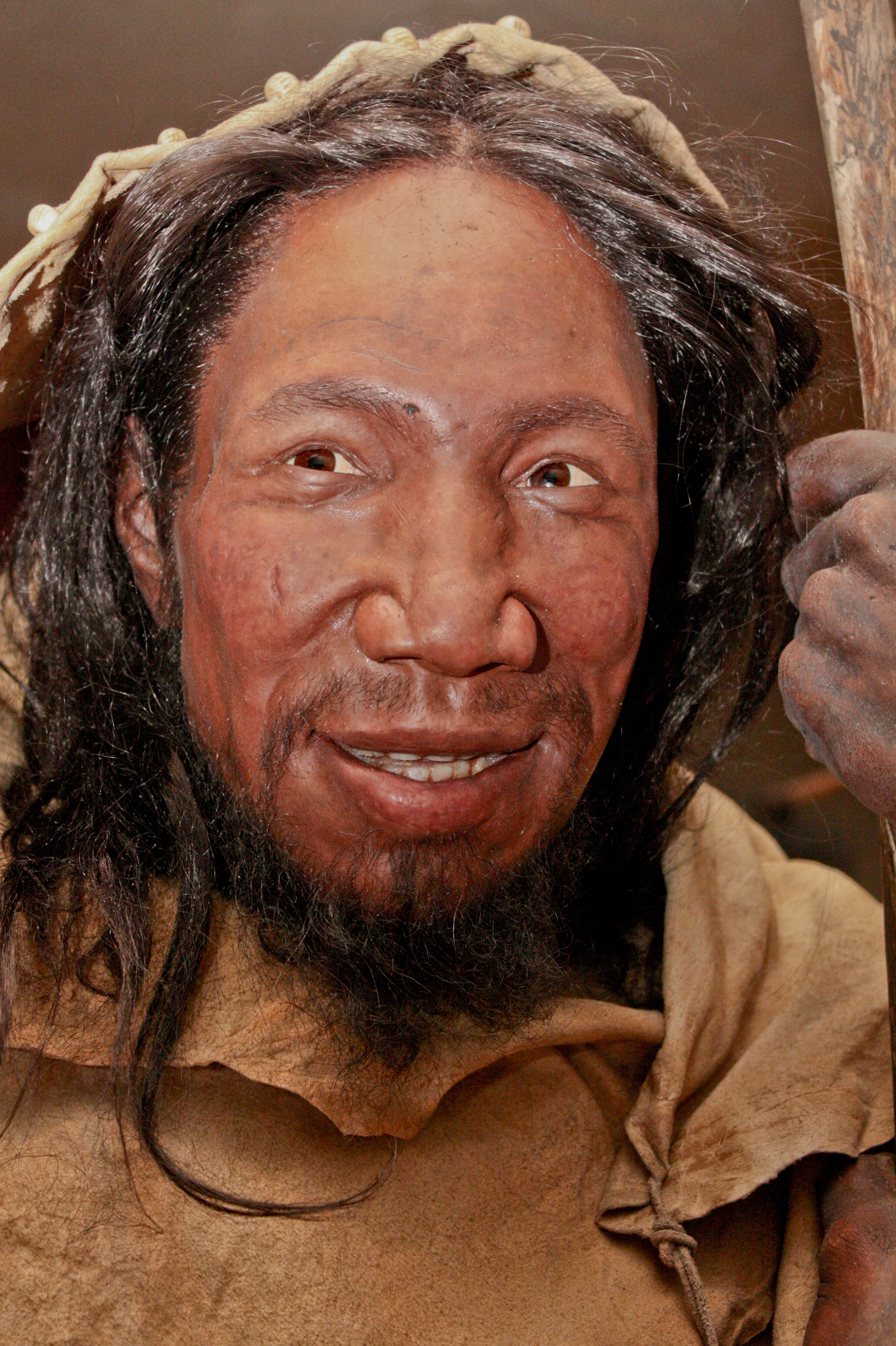
Reconstruction of the upper Palaeolithic human Oase 2 with around 7.3% Neanderthal DNA (from an ancestor 4–6 generations back)

One theory on the evolutionary and biological origins of autism traits in Homo sapiens that has gained recent attention in the 2010s and 2020s is that some genes linked to autism may have originated from early humans crossbreeding with Neanderthals, an extinct group of archaic humans (generally regarded as a distinct species, Homo neanderthalensis, though some regard it as a subspecies of Homo sapiens, referred to as H. sapiens ssp. neanderthalensis) who lived in Eurasia until about 40,000 years ago.

A possible link between autism spectrum disorders (ASDs) and Neanderthal DNA was identified in 2009, pending genome sequencing.

The first Neanderthal genome sequence was published in 2010, and strongly indicated interbreeding between Neanderthals and early modern humans. The genomes of all studied modern populations contain Neanderthal DNA. Various estimates exist for the proportion, such as 1–4% or 3.4–7.9% in modern Eurasians, or 1.8–2.4% in modern Europeans and 2.3–2.6% in modern East Asians. Pre-agricultural Europeans appear to have had similar, or slightly higher, percentages to modern East Asians, and the numbers may have decreased in the former due to dilution with a group of people which had split off before Neanderthal introgression.

Typically, studies have reported finding no significant levels of Neanderthal DNA in Sub-Saharan Africans, but a 2020 study detected 0.3-0.5% in the genomes of five African sample populations, likely the result of Eurasians back-migrating and interbreeding with Africans, as well as human-to-Neanderthal gene flow from dispersals of Homo sapiens preceding the larger Out-of-Africa migration, and also showed more equal Neanderthal DNA percentages for European and Asian populations. Such low percentages of Neanderthal DNA in all present day populations indicate infrequent past interbreeding, unless interbreeding was more common with a different population of modern humans which did not contribute to the present day gene pool. Of the inherited Neanderthal genome, 25% in modern Europeans and 32% in modern East Asians may be related to viral immunity. In all, approximately 20% of the Neanderthal genome appears to have survived in the modern human gene pool.

Due to their small population and resulting reduced effectivity of natural selection, Neanderthals accumulated several weakly harmful mutations, which were introduced to and slowly selected out of the much larger modern human population; the initial hybridised population may have experienced up to a 94% reduction in fitness compared to contemporary humans. By this measure, Neanderthals may have substantially increased in fitness. A 2017 study focusing on archaic genes in Turkey found associations with coeliac disease, malaria severity and Costello syndrome.

Nonetheless, some genes may have helped modern East Asians adapt to the environment; the putatively Neanderthal Val92Met variant of the MC1R gene, which may be weakly associated with red hair and UV radiation sensitivity, is primarily found in East Asian, rather than European, individuals. Some genes related to the immune system appear to have been affected by introgression, which may have aided migration, such as OAS1, STAT2, TLR6, TLR1, TLR10, and several related to immune response. (Note: OAS1 and STAT2 both are associated with fighting viral inflections (interferons), and the listed toll-like receptors (TLRs) allow cells to identify bacterial, fungal, or parasitic pathogens. African origin is also correlated with a stronger inflammatory response.) In addition, Neanderthal genes have also been implicated in the structure and function of the brain, (Note: Higher levels of Neanderthal-derived genes are associated with an occipital and parietal bone shape reminiscent to that of Neanderthals, as well as modifications to the visual cortex and the intraparietal sulcus (associated with visual processing).) keratin filaments, sugar metabolism, muscle contraction, body fat distribution, enamel thickness and oocyte meiosis. Nonetheless, a large portion of surviving introgression appears to be non-coding ("junk") DNA with few biological functions.

A 2016 study indicated that human-Neanderthal gene variance may be involved in autism, with chromosome 16 section 16p11.2 deletions playing a large role.

A 2017 study reported finding that the more Neanderthal DNA a person has in their genome, the more closely the brain of the individual would resemble that of a Neanderthal. The study also found that parts of the Neanderthal brain related to tool use and visual discrimination may have also experienced evolutionary or adaptational "trade-offs" with the "social brain", as also found in scientific studies on autism. A 2023 study also found evidence that Neanderthal single nucleotide polymorphisms (SNPs) likely play a "significant role" in autism susceptibility and heritability in autism populations across the United States. According to the study, "Although most studies on autism genomics focus on the deleterious nature of variants, there is the possibility some of these autism-associated Neanderthal SNPs have been under weak positive selection. In support, recent studies have identified genetic variants implicated in both autism and high intelligence. Meanwhile, autistic people often perform better on tests of fluid intelligence than neurotypicals."

Another 2017 study that analyzed 68 genes associated with neurodevelopmental disorders, including autism, found that these disorders were also affected by natural selection and interbreeding between Homo sapiens and other archaic human species. The study also recommended further research into the link between Neanderthal single nucleotide polymorphisms (SNPs) and neurodevelopmental disorders, including autism, in modern-day humans.

A 2021 study confirmed these findings, noting that "the protective allele of rs7170637(A) CYFIP1, [one of the genes associated with autism spectrum disorder (ASD)], was present in primates to Neanderthals, and reemerged in modern humans, while absent in early modern humans"; "identified significant positive selection signals in 18 ASD risk SNPs"; that "ancient genome analysis identified de novo mutations...representing genes involved in cognitive function...and conserved evolutionary selection clusters"; and that "relative enrichment of the ASD risk SNPs from the respective evolutionary cluster or biological interaction networks may help in addressing the phenotypic diversity in ASD", with "cognitive genomic tradeoff signatures impacting the biological networks [explaining] the paradoxical phenotypes in ASD".

== Disputed theories ==
=== Acetaminophen (Paracetamol) ===
At a White House press briefing on September 22, 2025, President Trump, joined by Kennedy and other senior officials, said the FDA would revise drug labels to discourage the use of acetaminophen (sold under the brand name Tylenol) during pregnancy, citing a possible link to autism. Medical and public health experts disputed the claim. Steven J. Fleischman, president of the American College of Obstetricians and Gynecologists, wrote, "It is highly unsettling that our federal health agencies are willing to make an announcement that will affect the health and well-being of millions of people without the backing of reliable data." A month later, on October 29, Kennedy retracted his statements from the press conference, stating that acetaminophen use in pregnancy is not linked to autism.

On November 10, 2025, in response to President Trump's false claim, a 2025 British Medical Journal umbrella review was fast-tracked and confirmed no convincing evidence that paracetamol (acetaminophen) use during pregnancy increases the risk of autism spectrum disorder (ASD) or attention deficit hyperactivity disorder (ADHD) in children. The review, led by researchers at the University of Liverpool, analysed nine systematic reviews covering 40 observational studies and concluded that any apparent associations were likely due to family genetics, maternal health, or other shared factors rather than the drug itself. The findings were published after President Trump and Kennedy both claimed that paracetamol use during pregnancy was contributing to rising autism rates, urging women to avoid the common painkiller. Health experts and the World Health Organization rejected those claims, emphasizing that paracetamol remains the safest recommended medication for fever and pain relief during pregnancy, as untreated fever can pose serious risks to fetal development.

Acetaminophen and paracetamol are the same chemical drug compound. The name acetaminophen (brand name Tylenol) is commonly used in the United States while the name paracetamol (brand name Panadol) is commonly used in Europe and worldwide.

=== Refrigerator mother ===
Psychologist Bruno Bettelheim believed that autism was linked to early childhood trauma, and his work was highly influential for decades both in the medical and popular spheres. In his discredited theory, he blamed the mothers of individuals with autism for having caused their child's condition through the withholding of affection. Leo Kanner, who first described autism, suggested that parental coldness might contribute to autism. Although Kanner eventually renounced the theory, Bettelheim put an almost exclusive emphasis on it in both his medical and his popular books. Treatments based on these theories failed to help children with autism, and after Bettelheim's death, his reported rates of cure (around 85%) were found to be fraudulent.

=== Vaccines ===
The most recent scientific research has determined that changes to brain structures correlated with the development of autism can already be detected while the child is still in the womb, well before any vaccines are administered. Furthermore, scientific studies have consistently refuted a causal relationship between vaccinations and autism.

Despite this, some parents believe that vaccinations cause autism; they therefore delay or avoid immunizing their children (for example, under the "vaccine overload" hypothesis that giving many vaccines at once may overwhelm a child's immune system and lead to autism, even though this hypothesis has no scientific evidence and is biologically implausible). Diseases such as measles can cause severe disabilities and even death, so the risk of death or disability for an unvaccinated child is higher than the risk for a child who has been vaccinated. Despite medical evidence, antivaccine activism continues. A developing tactic is the "promotion of irrelevant research to justify the science underlying a questionable claim."

==== MMR vaccine ====
The MMR vaccine as a cause of autism is one of the most extensively debated hypotheses regarding the origins of autism. Andrew Wakefield et al. reported a study of 12 children who had autism and bowel symptoms, in some cases reportedly with onset after MMR. Although the paper, which was later retracted by the journal, concluded that there was no association between the MMR vaccine and autism, Wakefield nevertheless suggested a false notion during a 1998 press conference that giving children the vaccines in three separate doses would be safer than a single dose. Administering the vaccines in three separate doses does not reduce the chance of adverse effects, and it increases the opportunity for infection by the two diseases not immunized against first.

In 2004, the interpretation of a causal link between MMR vaccine and autism was formally retracted by ten of Wakefield's twelve co-authors. The retraction followed an investigation by The Sunday Times, which stated that Wakefield "acted dishonestly and irresponsibly". The Centers for Disease Control and Prevention, the Institute of Medicine of the National Academy of Sciences, and the U.K. National Health Service have all concluded that there is no evidence of a link between the MMR vaccine and autism.

In February 2010, The Lancet, which published Wakefield's study, fully retracted it after an independent auditor found the study to be flawed. In January 2011, an investigation published in the journal BMJ described the Wakefield study as the result of deliberate fraud and manipulation of data.

==== Thiomersal (thimerosal) ====
Perhaps the best-known hypothesis involving mercury and autism involves the use of the mercury-based compound thiomersal, a preservative that has been phased out from most childhood vaccinations in developed countries including the US and EU. There is no scientific evidence for a connection between thiomersal and autism, but parental concern about a relationship between thiomersal and vaccines led to decreasing rates of childhood immunizations and increasing likelihood of disease outbreaks in the 1990s. In 1999, the U.S. Public Health Service recommended that thiomersal be removed from childhood vaccines. By 2002, the flu vaccine was the only childhood vaccine using thiomersal. The removal of thiomersal did not decrease autism rates in any country that removed thiomersal from their childhood vaccines.

A causal link between thiomersal and autism has been rejected by international scientific and medical professional bodies including the American Medical Association, the American Academy of Pediatrics, the American College of Medical Toxicology, the Canadian Paediatric Society, the U.S. National Academy of Sciences, the Food and Drug Administration, Centers for Disease Control and Prevention, the World Health Organization, the Public Health Agency of Canada, and the European Medicines Agency.

== See also ==
- List of topics characterized as pseudoscience
- Mechanism of autism
- Sex differences in autism

== Bibliography ==
- Reich, D. (2018). "Encounters with Neanderthals". Who we are and how we got here: ancient DNA and the new science of the human past. Oxford University Press. ISBN 978-0-19-882125-0.
