= Autistic catatonia =

Occurrence of catatonia in autistic people

Autistic catatonia is a term used to describe the occurrence of catatonia in autistic people. Catatonia is a complex behavioral syndrome typically characterized by immobility, withdrawal, abnormal movements, and abnormal behaviors. According to current diagnostic guidelines, its primary feature is that it causes patients to demonstrate one or more of the following: 1) decreased movement; 2) "decreased engagement during an interview or physical examination", and/or 3) "excessive and peculiar movement".

Research suggests that at least 1 in 10 autistic people experience catatonia, while others have suggested that the true number may be as high as 1 in 5. More specifically, prevalence estimates of catatonia among people with neurodevelopmental disorders (of which autism is one) have ranged from 6-20.2%, with the mean estimate falling at 9%; similarly, in a recent meta-analysis of 12 studies of autistic catatonia, Vaquerizo-Serrano et al. suggest that catatonia is found in 10.4% of autistic people. At the same time, as Shah suggests, the real number of sufferers may be much higher, as "there are probably a lot more people with autism and catatonia who do not have a diagnosis and are not known to services."

Autistic catatonia is currently recognized by the Diagnostic and Statistical Manual of Mental Disorders, Fifth Edition (DSM-5), which is the major taxonomic and diagnostic tool published by the American Psychiatric Association. The DSM does not currently treat autistic catatonia as a separate disorder. However, as of the fifth edition, it allows for the diagnosis of catatonia in autistic people by means of the designations "Catatonia--Not Otherwise Specified" and "Autism--With Catatonia". In 2013, the editors of the DSM-5 published an explicit justification for this new formulation of catatonia, saying, in part, that this change would make it more possible to diagnose the presence of catatonia in autism.

Autistic catatonia is an understudied and underrecognized condition. Catatonia of all kinds is frequently missed by clinicians. Studies have found that it is frequently overlooked in a wide range of contexts: among patients with schizophrenia, with major mood disorders, and with general medical conditions; among autistic people; and among people in the ICU. Catatonia in autistic people is especially hard to recognize because many of the symptoms of catatonia (such as mutism, withdrawal, stereotypy, and echolalia, among others) overlap with the symptoms of autism. For this reason, it is often the case that clinicians will not recognise and diagnose the most commonly seen manifestation of catatonia in autism, which is a gradual deterioration/breakdown in functioning and difficulty with voluntary movements.

In addition to the common sign of catatonia (posturing, negativism, mutism, and stupor), autistic people with catatonia are more likely to stim and self-harm.

== Pathology ==
There exists debate over the biological origins of autistic catatonia. Some studies have suggested that dysfunction of GABA and its receptors are primary causes for autistic catatonia. Also, neuroimaging studies have indicated that autistic catatonic patients have abnormally small cerebellar structures. Furthermore, genetic studies have implied that alterations on chromosome 15 may underpin the disease.

Alternatively, catatonia has been frequently observed in patients with severe anxiety. Because autism can cause individuals to be susceptible to anxiety, the prevalence of catatonia in autism may be attributable to anxiety.

== Symptoms ==
Catatonia is defined as the presence of at least three of the following twelve traits: catalepsy, waxy flexibility, posturing, grimacing, mutism, negativism, stupor, mannerism, stereotypy, echolalia, echopraxia, and agitation.

Symptoms overlap with autism spectrum disorder. Thus, diagnosis of catatonic breakdown can be difficult. Childhood schizophrenia increases the risk for autistic catatonia later in life dramatically. Also, it seems that the processes that give rise to psychosis, catatonia, and autism are similar.

== Treatment ==
There exists great diversity in treatments for autistic catatonia. The psycho-ecological approach considers the individual's profile of autism, identifies the underlying causes behind their catatonia, and formulates support strategies. These strategies vary depending on the individual and their difficulties.

It has also been shown that benzodiazapines are effective for some patients. More recently, electroconvulsive therapy (ECT) has been trialed, with mixed effect. Several patients have responded well to intensive, multi-month ECT regimens after other treatments failed. Furthermore, ECT was successfully used to treat symptoms in patients prone to self-injury and compulsive behavior. However, it seems that ECT must be continued for long periods of time to prevent re-onset of autistic catatonic symptoms. Furthermore, there is popular resistance to the idea of inducing seizures as treatment - which ECT relies on - especially in pediatric patients.

== History ==
Karl Ludwig Kahlbaum was among the first to systematically describe catatonia, which in 1874 he documented as a separate brain disorder. The phenomenon was later described by Emil Kraepelin as a precursor disease that led to dementia. It was not until the 1970s that catatonia was recognized as a feature of other affective psychiatric disorders in adults, especially manias.
