= Delayed parenthood =

Delayed parenthood is denoted:

- Advanced maternal age for women
- Paternal age effect for men
