= National Council on Severe Autism =

American non-profit organization

- Formation: April 5, 2018; 8 years ago
- Tax ID no.: 83-0665732
- Headquarters: California
- President: Jill Escher
- Vice President: Amy S.F. Lutz
- Secretary: Gloria Satriale
- Treasurer: Mark Kendall
- Revenue: $160,443 (2025)
- Expenses: $190,994 (2025)
- Website: www.ncsautism.org

The National Council on Severe Autism (NCSA) is an American non-profit organization that advocates for autistic children and adults who require constant, lifelong supervision and support. It was founded in April 2018. It is generally wary of the neurodiversity movement, which they say marginalizes "those with more severe needs", and has been criticized by autistic self-advocates.

== Charitable focus ==
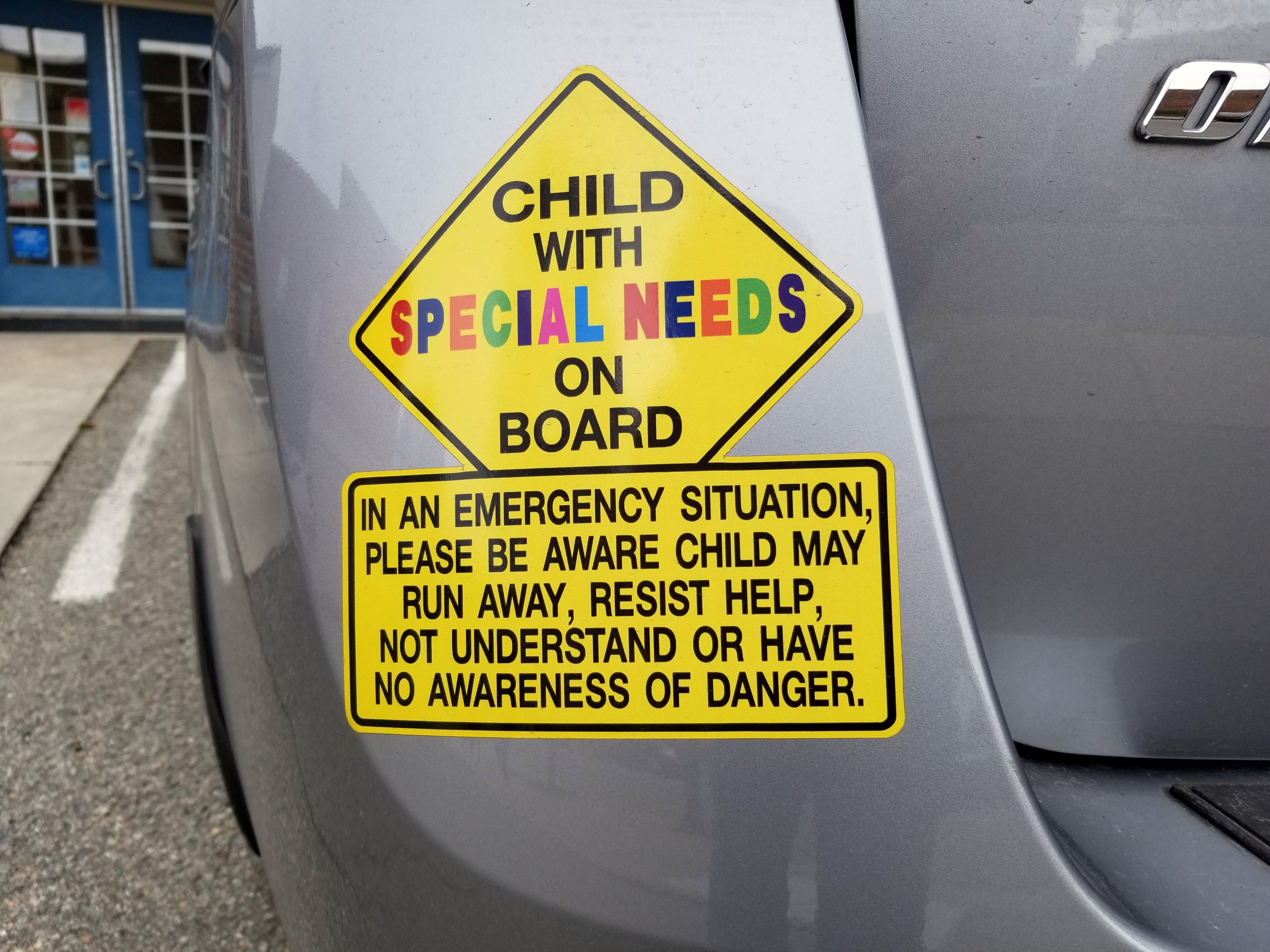
This bumper sticker warns first responders that they may encounter a child with special needs.

The charitable focus of the NCSA is the large fraction of people who, whether due solely to autism or due to autism in combination with other disabilities, require continuous supervision and significant support. They often have intellectual disability (30%), are nonverbal, engage in self-injury, or are aggressive. They may need lifelong total care, and in previous decades, their parents would have been encouraged to institutionalize them from an early age. The NCSA focuses on people who are so disabled that they cannot self-advocate, though they also "fully support" self-advocacy and autonomy for those who are less disabled. This has drawn criticism from people who view the label severe autism as harmful and consider the NCSA's blog posts about families' lived experiences to be "horror stories".

The creation of the NCSA has been welcomed by some parents of autistic children with high support needs. However, critics (including members of the autistic community) have claimed the NCSA opposes the right of autistic people (especially those with high support needs) to engage in self-determination.

== Views of autism awareness ==
The NCSA was formed by families of people with more impairments and more significant needs as an advocacy group to attract attention to the significant needs of people who require lifelong, round-the-clock services.

The NCSA has opposed efforts to discourage the use of medical terms such as disorder, deficit, risk, and symptoms, claiming that avoiding the use of such words harms families for whom autism is a life-limiting impairment. They object to romanticizing autism, that is, to presenting autism in an unrealistic, idealized manner. However, they also support people (who are able to communicate) self-identifying however they want.

Some autistic self-advocates have expressed concern that awareness actions undertaken by the NCSA and its members, such as social media posts showing an adult having an autistic meltdown or parents engaging in online sharenting about an older child who is not toilet trained, could imperil their efforts to reduce discrimination in the workplace and in schools. Critics have argued the group wants to strip autonomy from a subgroup of autistic adults who generally have "a low intelligence quotient, limited speech and difficulty performing everyday tasks" by promoting legal guardianship, specialized supportive housing programs (including locked facilities for people who display wandering behavior), and other policies that allow other people to make decisions for the autistic individual.

== Specific positions ==
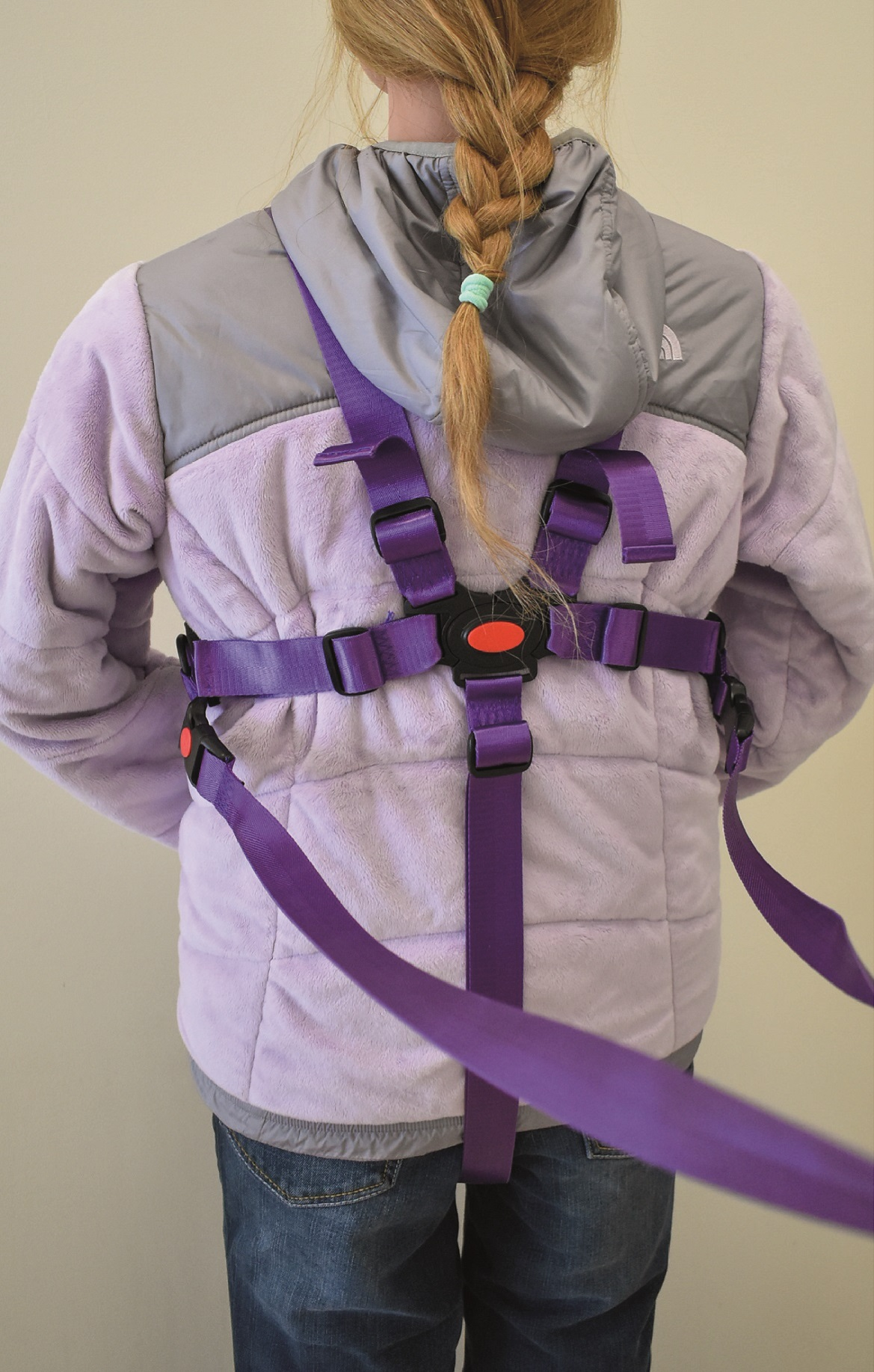
The NCSA supports the use of physical restraints for autistic children in certain circumstances, such as this child harness.

The NCSA supports the use of restraints, in some cases, such as a padded helmet to prevent brain and eye injuries in people who self-harm.

They support sheltered workshops, which pay only a token amount of money to workers, as an option for some autistic people, saying that earning money is not the primary purpose of such workshops.

The NCSA rejects all forms of facilitated communication, including the rapid prompting method, which are scientifically discredited attempts to communicate with nonverbal people by having a "facilitator" physically help them point to pictures or push buttons.

== People ==
Amy S.F. Lutz, a founding member, has written about her experiences as the mother of an autistic son with high support needs. She opposed Medicaid's restrictions on funding home- and community-based settings. Autistic self-advocates and the American Civil Liberties Union have criticized many such settings for isolating residents from the wider community and failing to provide them with fully paid work. Lutz sees an institutional or institutional-like setting as not being inappropriate for autistic adults who "require more support than can be safely and consistently delivered in dispersed settings". Her experience in New Jersey, when a young adult with autism eloped from a group home and spent three weeks in jail while the state struggled to find another residential placement for him, convinced her of the power of parents advocating for the needs and safety of their children.

Jill Escher, a founding member, was the president of the Autism Society San Francisco Bay Area before founding the NCSA. She has expressed frustration with neurodiversity advocates who "cherrypick naive feel-good stories" and consequently minimize the reality of severe autism.

Alison Singer, founder of the Autism Science Foundation, is also a founding board member. Other founding board members include Judith Ursitti of Autism Speaks and the Profound Autism Alliance, Feda Almaliti, Lisa Parles, Frank Campagna, Gloria Satriale, and Matthew Siegel. Later Board members include Eileen Lamb, an autistic woman and the founder of The Autism Cafe blog.
