= National Database for Autism Research =

Defunct research data repository

- Founded: 2006
- Founder: National Institutes of Health
- Defunct: 2018
- Successor: National Institute of Mental Health Data Archive
- Headquarters: Rockville, Maryland
- Website: Official website (archived)

The National Database for Autism Research (NDAR) was an American data repository that promoted scientific data sharing and collaboration among autism researchers. The project was launched in 2006 as a joint effort between five institutes and multiple national institute centers. (Note: Those institutions being the NIH, the NIMH, the NICHD, the NINDS, the NIEHS, and the CIT.) The goal of NDAR was to provide a shared common platform for data collection, retrieval, and archiving to accelerate the advancement of autism research. As of November 2013, data from over 90,000 research participants was available to qualified investigators through the NDAR portal. By 2018, NDAR had been subsumed by the National Institute of Mental Health (NIMH) Data Archive.

== Oversight and governance ==
The director of NIMH oversaw NDAR and its implementation and belonged to a governing committee responsible for its ongoing management. This committee included several other National Institutes of Health (NIH) institute and center directors or their designees.

The NDAR Implementation Team was one of the groups providing direction on NDAR, specifically data submission and access, in order to promote consistent participant protections.

The Autism Informatics Consortium was launched in 2011 with the goal of making informatics tools and resources to autism researchers. Members at launch included Autism Speaks, the Kennedy Krieger Institute, the Simons Foundation, Prometheus Research, and the NIH.

== Projects ==
=== Global Unique Identifier ===
The NDAR Global Unique Identifier (GUID) is a subject identifier used to protect the confidentiality of a research subject. The GUID was the result of a collaboration between NDAR, the Simons Foundation, and a team of researchers from Columbia University.

=== Data dictionary ===
As of 2014, NDAR provided and curated a data dictionary containing over 400 instruments (forms) for data definition by the autism researcher community.

=== Tools ===
After analyses of functional genomics acquisition and storage criteria, as well as a review of the needs of the research community, NDAR staff developed a tool to better define the relationship between the samples and data files.

== Data sharing ==
As of 2012, NDAR supported the receipt of unprocessed brain images in DICOM format, as well as processed images in variety of formats, including DICOM, MINC 1.0 and 2.0, Analyze, NIfTI-1, AFNI and SPM. Images could be visualized using the built-in image registration and visualization tool (MIPAV).

By 2015, NDAR was accessible through the LONI Pipeline processing environment. The repository also provided basic descriptive and aggregate summary information for general public use.

== Federation ==
As of 2012, NDAR was federated with four other private databases: the Autism Genetic Resource Exchange, the Autism Tissue Program, and the Interactive Autism Network. This federation allowed the data to be kept in its respective locations while enabling users to search across the databases simultaneously. These repositories all used the NDAR GUID, as well as common data definitions.

== Retirement ==
On July 11, 2017, the NIMH proposed combining NDAR with several other digital repositories, including the Research Domain Criteria Database, the National Database for Clinical Trials Related to Mental Illness, and the NIH Pediatric MRI Repository, under the banner of the NIMH Data Archive. By 2018, the newly combined archive had begun releasing new data sets to researchers.

== Awards ==
- 2008 and 2009 NIH Award of Merit
- 2011 HHS Innovates Award
- NIMH's Top 10 Research Advances of 2011

== See also ==
- Interagency Autism Coordinating Committee
