= David Spergel =

American astrophysicist

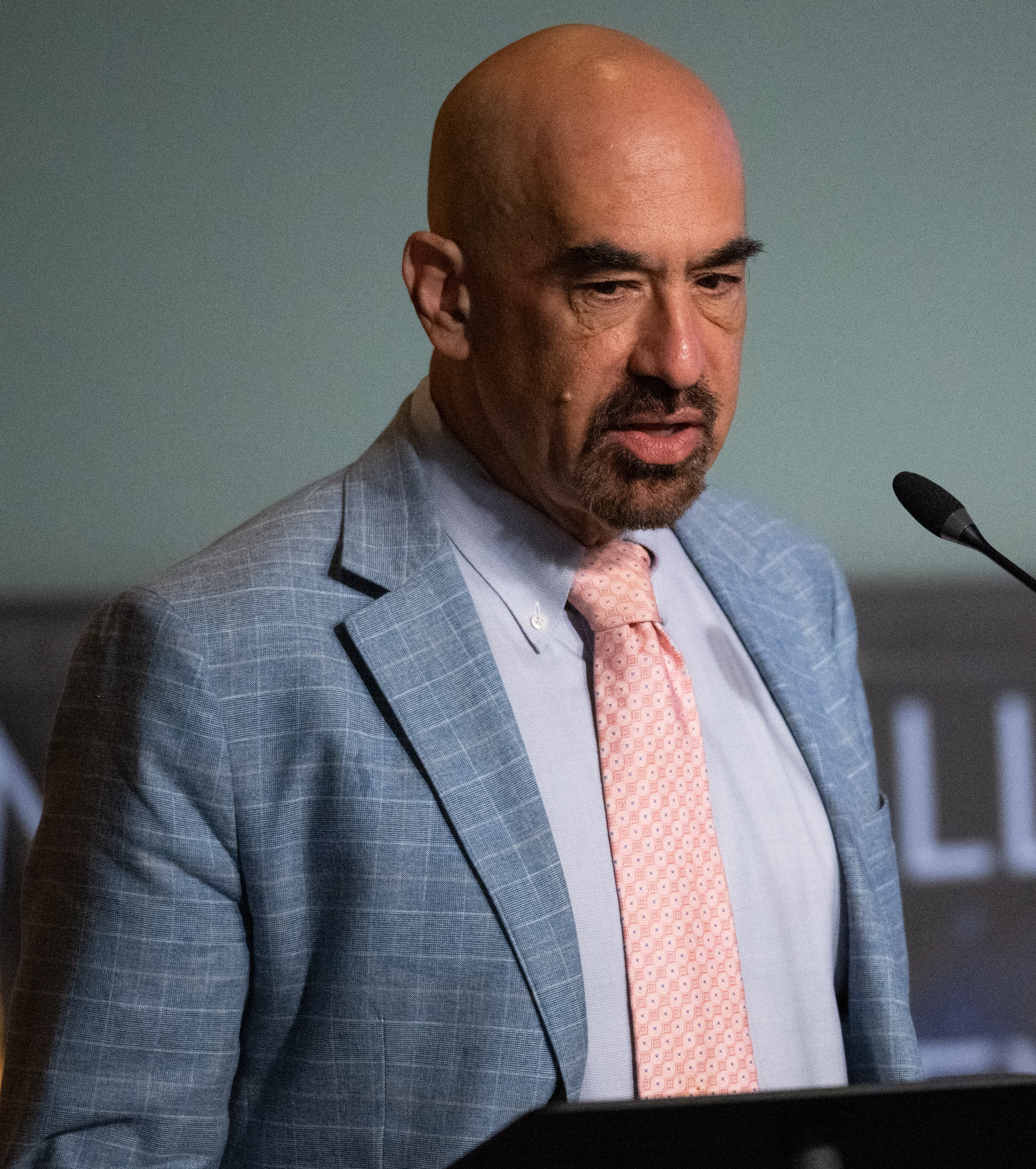
- David Spergel speaks during a public meeting of NASA's UAP independent study team on May 31, 2023.
- Born: David Nathaniel Spergel; March 25, 1961 (age 65)
- Education: Princeton University; Harvard University
- Known for: Co-leading the Wilkinson Microwave Anisotropy Probe project
- Awards: Helen B. Warner Prize for Astronomy; Shaw Prize in Astronomy; Dannie Heineman Prize for Astrophysics; Breakthrough Prize in Fundamental Physics
- Scientific career
- Fields: Astrophysics
- Workplaces: Princeton University; Flatiron Institute; Simons Foundation
- Thesis: The astrophysical implications of weakly interacting, massive particles (1985)
- Doctoral advisor: William H. Press
- Doctoral students: Arlie Petters; Julianne Dalcanton; Hiranya Peiris; Shirley Ho; Blake Daniel Sherwin; William Coulton; Katharine R. Long

David Nathaniel Spergel is an American theoretical astrophysicist and the Emeritus Charles A. Young Professor of Astronomy on the Class of 1897 Foundation at Princeton University. Since 2021, he has been the President of the Simons Foundation. He is known for his work on the Wilkinson Microwave Anisotropy Probe (WMAP) project. In 2022, Spergel accepted the chair of NASA's UAP independent study team.

== Early life and education ==
Spergel was born to a Jewish family in Rochester, New York. His father, Martin Spergel, was also a physicist and a professor at York College, City University of New York; he died in 2021. His mother was a high school home-economics teacher. The junior Spergel attended John Glenn High School in Huntington, New York. He has a brother and a sister. He considered his father, who had "a really satisfying career as a college teacher" a role model, especially the aspect of his father's work in mentoring students who were "first in their family" to attend college.

Spergel graduated summa cum laude with a Bachelor of Arts (AB) from Princeton University in 1982, after completing a senior thesis on red giants under the supervision of Gillian R. Knapp. He then went to the University of Oxford as a visiting scholar in 1983, where he studied with James Binney. He obtained his Master of Arts (AM) in 1984 and his PhD in 1985, both from Harvard University.

== Career ==
At the invitation of John N. Bahcall, Spergel joined the Institute for Advanced Studies after his PhD. He left and moved to Princeton University in 1987 as an assistant professor. He was promoted to associate professor in 1992 and full professor in 1997. In 2007, he was appointed the Charles A. Young Professor of Astronomy on the Class of 1897 Foundation.

Spergel joined the Flatiron Institute in 2016 as the founding director of the Center for Computational Astrophysics. Citing the hesitance to hold onto 2 positions, he retired from Princeton University in 2019 at the age of 59, and has remained as emeritus professor since.

Spergel is a 2001 MacArthur Fellow, and was a member of the NASA Advisory Council and chair of the Space Studies Board. He was the Keck Distinguished Visiting Professor at the Institute for Advanced Study from 2000 to 2001.

Since 1994, Spergel is part of the Wilkinson Microwave Anisotropy Probe (WMAP) project consortium. Currently, he is a member of the Simons Observatory, chairs the Science Definition Team of the Nancy Grace Roman Space Telescope (formerly known as the Wide-Field Infrared Survey Telescope), and sits on the Board of Trustees of the Carnegie Institution for Science (since 2022).

In 2022, Spergel was invited to lead NASA's UAP independent study team of sixteen members to provide guidance in better understanding "unidentified anomalous phenomena".

== Honors and awards ==
- Helen B. Warner Prize for Astronomy (1994)
- Member of the National Academy of Sciences (2007)
- Shaw Prize in Astronomy (2010)
- Member of the American Academy of Arts and Sciences (2012)
- 25 Most Influential Space Scientists, Time (2012)
- Nature's 10 (2014)
- Dannie Heineman Prize for Astrophysics (2015)
- NASA Exceptional Public Service Medal (2017)
- Breakthrough Prize in Fundamental Physics (2018)
- Legacy Fellow of the American Astronomical Society (2020)
- NASA Exceptional Public Service Medal (2022) (received the second time)
- American Philosophical Society (2022)
- Nikolaos Kylafis Lecturer (2024)
