= Shirley Ho =

American cosmologist and astrophysicist

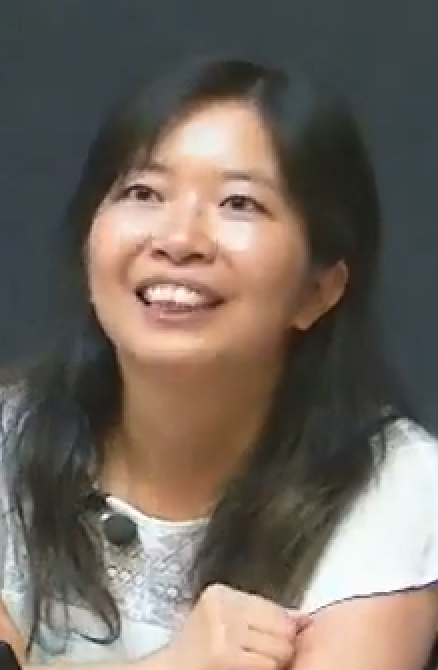
- Ho in 2018
- Education: University of California, Berkeley, Princeton University
- Known for: dark matter, dark energy, Machine Learning in Astrophysics
- Scientific career
- Fields: Astrophysics, Deep Learning, Cosmology
- Workplaces: Flatiron Institute, New York University
- Thesis: Baryons, Universe and Everything Else in Between
- Doctoral advisor: David Spergel

Shirley Ho is an American astrophysicist and machine learning researcher, currently at the Center for Computational Astrophysics at the Flatiron Institute, and an affiliated faculty at the Center for Data Science at New York University.

== Biography ==
Ho graduated with a B.A. in physics and a B.A. in computer science from the University of California at Berkeley. She pursued her Ph.D. at the Department of Astrophysical Sciences of Princeton University. In 2008 she obtained her doctorate in Astrophysical Sciences. Subsequently, she worked in the Lawrence Berkeley National Laboratory between 2008 and 2012 in a postdoctoral position as a Chamberlain and a Seaborg Fellow.

Ho worked at Carnegie Mellon University, first as an assistant professor and then as an associate (with indefinite tenure) professor in physics. Ho was named Cooper-Siegel Development Chair Professor in 2015 at Carnegie Mellon University. In 2016, she moved back to the Lawrence Berkeley National Laboratory as a Senior Scientist while being on leave from Carnegie Mellon University.

In 2018, Ho joined the Simons Foundation as leader of the Cosmology X Data Science group at the Center for Computational Astrophysics (CCA) at the Flatiron Institute.

== Research ==
Ho researches cosmology, deep learning and its applications in astrophysics and data science. In particular, she is interested in developing and deploying deep learning to better understand the Universe, and other astrophysical phenomena.

She has contributed to several areas of astrophysics: cosmic microwave background, cosmological models, dark energy, dark matter, spatial distribution of galaxies and quasars, Baryon Acoustic Oscillations, and cosmological simulations.

Regarding deep learning and its and applications to cosmology and astrophysics., Ho's team participated in the development of accelerated astrophysical simulations. She contributes to the development and deployment of deep-learning-accelerated simulation-based inference framework for large spectroscopic surveys, and further accelerated physical simulations ranging from fluid dynamics to planetary dynamics simulations. Her current team at the Flatiron Institute and Princeton University combines symbolic regression and neural networks to recover physical laws directly from observations, demonstrating symbolic regression as an example of good inductive bias for interpretable machine learning for science.

More recently, Ho has led a team of researchers at Polymathic AI to create foundation models for sciences, most notably releasing large datasets and foundation models in astrophysics and fluid dynamics.

== Prizes ==
Ho has won several prizes for her contributions, including:

- NASA Group Achievement Award for contribution to the Planck mission (2011) and Nancy Grace Roman Space Telescope (2022)
- Macronix Prize (2014): The Outstanding Young Researcher Award by International Organization of Chinese Physicists and Astronomers
- Carnegie Science Award (2015), assigned for outstanding science and technology achievements in western Pennsylvania
- Finalist for the Blavatnik Awards for Young Scientists (2023)
- Schmidt Sciences AI2050 Senior Fellow Award (2025)
