= Eileen Lamb =

French-American autism advocate

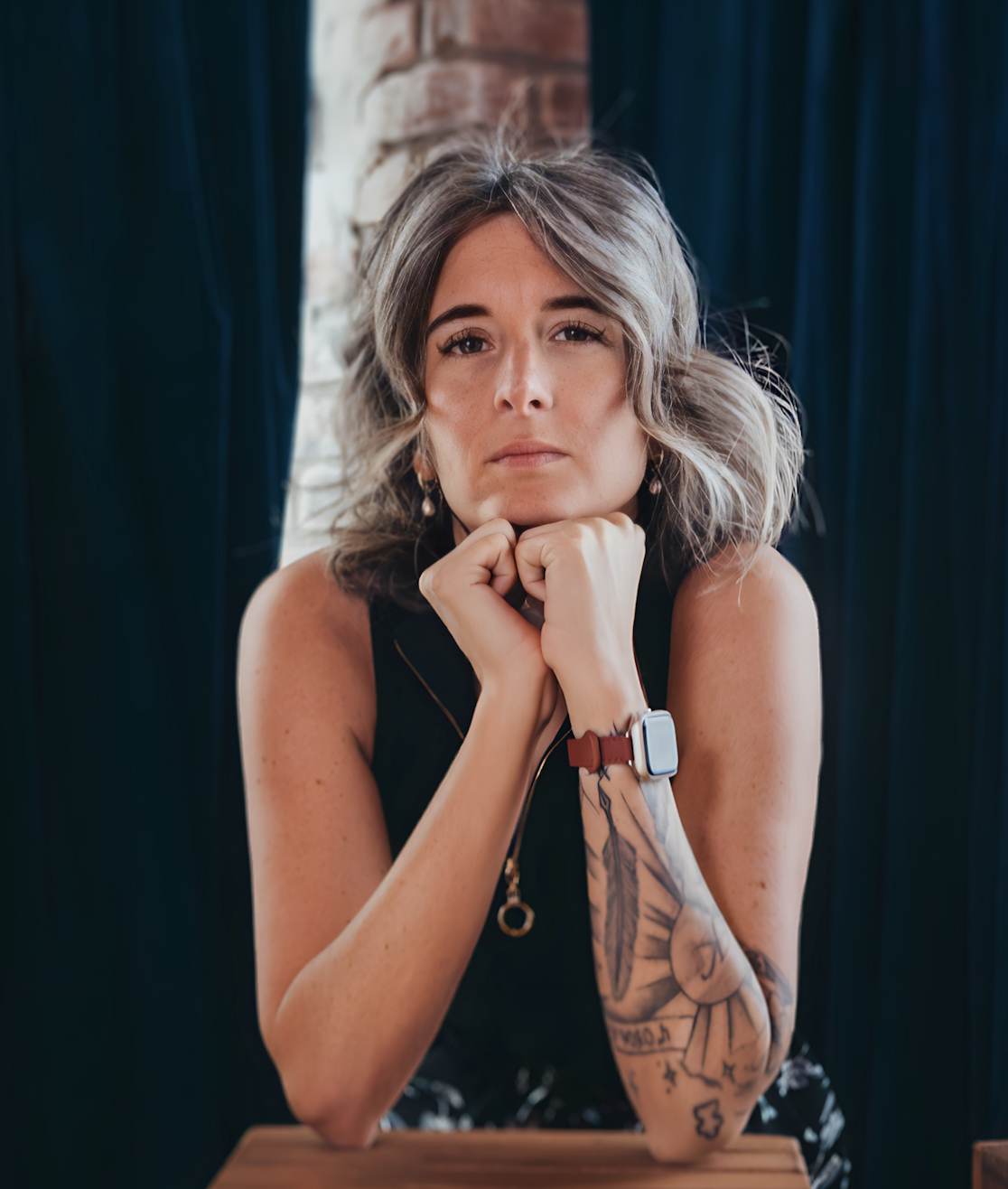
- Born: 1989 or 1990 (age 35–36); France
- Occupations: Author, Autism advocate, Photographer, Content creator, Podcast host
- Children: 3
- Writing career
- Language: English, French
- Genre: Non-fiction
- Notable works: All Across The Spectrum (2019); Be The One (2021); And Yet - Here You Are (2024)
- Website: theautismcafe.com

Eileen Lamb (née Geoffroy; born 1989 or 1990) is a French-American autism advocate, author, photographer, and content creator. She is the founder of the online platform and blog The Autism Cafe, where she writes about her personal experiences as an autistic adult and as a mother of two autistic children, including a son with highly intensive support needs.

Lamb is generally critical of the neurodiversity paradigm and has worked for or joined the leadership of autism-focused organizations that also reject that paradigm and emphasize the medical model of disability, such as Autism Speaks and the National Council on Severe Autism (NCSA).

== Early life and education ==
Born and raised in France, Lamb earned her bachelor's degree online in literature and foreign languages from a French university.

== Career ==
When she was 21, Lamb moved to Austin, Texas to work as an au pair.

Lamb has written three books: All Across the Spectrum (2019), Be The One (2021), and And Yet—Here You Are (2024).

In December 2021, Lamb joined controversial nonprofit Autism Speaks as a senior manager of social media and digital strategy, and was promoted to director of social media and influencer marketing in June 2023. As of July 2025, she serves as the senior director of social media and marketing for the organization. Lamb is also the host of the organization's Just Another Autism Podcast. Autism Speaks has historically been criticized by members of the autistic rights and neurodiversity movements for, amongst other things, its framing of autism as a disease in need of a cure, its exclusion of autistic people from leadership and decision-making, and its prioritization of genetic research over services and supports. Although it has taken action in response to such criticism, such as removing the word "cure" from its mission statement and installing a small number of autistic board members, many autistic activists have characterized such changes as cosmetic and tokenistic. A May 2025 Forbes profile of Autism Speaks claimed the organization was "working to rebuild trust" and said Lamb was helping it advocate for expanded access to healthcare, employer education, and assistive technologies.

== The Autism Cafe and autism advocacy ==
Lamb founded her blog, The Autism Cafe, in 2015, as a way to connect with other parents and document her family's journey following her eldest son's diagnosis. The platform is known for openly discussing the ups and downs of life in an autistic family, particularly the challenges of raising a child with highly intensive support needs while also being autistic herself.

Lamb's advocacy focuses on what she has termed "profound autism" (a controversial label she uses to describe autistic people with highly intensive support needs, which is a segment of the population she argues is often overlooked in broader neurodiversity conversations). Critics have characterized the "profound" label as reductive and stigmatizing and denied that formally implementing it as a separate diagnostic category is necessary to ensure appropriate support.

Lamb is a vocal supporter of applied behavior analysis (ABA)—a controversial operant-conditioning system commonly marketed as a treatment for autism—which she credits with helping her eldest son gain basic communication and life skills. This stance often places her in the center of online debates within the autism community. Lamb has defended the use of food reinforcers by some ABA practitioners, dismissing critics' comparison of the practice to dog training and saying she has no issue with her son being rewarded with Skittles if it prevents him from running in front of a car. Lamb has also accused critics of spreading "disinformation" about the contemporary practice of ABA by labeling it torture and broadly associating it with electric-shock aversives, forced masking, and other abuses. In 2019, the board certified behavior analyst treating Lamb's son reported her and her spouse to Child Protective Services after Lamb mentioned that her son had accidentally consumed a bottle of melatonin gummies and a dog treat he found in their home. According to Lamb, the case was closed after an investigator conducted a home visit and documented the childproofing measures they had taken. Lamb was upset no one had discussed the matter with her before filing the report and expressed doubt she would confide in her son's ABA practitioners again; however, she said she would try to work past her feelings of betrayal because her son was dependent on their expertise. In June 2026, Lamb announced on social media that her son was discontinuing ABA after 11 years of treatment, but that she remained a "big supporter" of ABA and still did not agree with those who labeled it abusive.

As of 2025, Lamb sits on the board of directors of the NCSA, a controversial nonprofit in general opposition to the neurodiversity paradigm, which has advocated for the adoption of "profound" or "severe" diagnostic labels for autistic people with highly intensive support needs, argued in favor of placing such individuals in specialized gated communities, and supported ABA and the conditional use of physical restraints. Lamb has been an NCSA board member since at least 2022, when she cosigned a letter objecting to the tentative use of only neutral and strengths-based language in the Interagency Autism Coordinating Committee's 2023 strategic plan. The letter stated, in part, "For most of us in the real world, impairments, dysfunctions, deficits, disorders, dependency, and not 'strengths,' define the daily experience of autism."

== Personal life ==
Lamb received an official diagnosis of autism spectrum disorder at the age of 26, shortly after her eldest son was diagnosed. She is the mother of three children: her eldest son (who was diagnosed with the most intensive support needs), her younger son (who is also autistic and was diagnosed with the least intensive support needs), and her daughter.

Lamb has American and French citizenship. As of 2025, she was living in Austin with her children. In July 2026, Lamb announced on social media that she no longer felt she could meet her eldest son's support needs safely at home and had begun the process of placing him in a residential care facility, a decision she described as "heartbreaking."

Lamb met her husband, Willy, in Austin, when she was working as an au pair. In March 2022, Lamb mentioned on her blog that the pair had separated, but that their children—including their then-unborn daughter—kept them "forever bonded." In August 2026, Lamb announced on social media that she was getting divorced; Lamb stated, "It's been a long time coming, and I'm proud of myself for finally choosing myself."

== Bibliography ==
Lamb is the author of three books:

- All Across The Spectrum (2019): A collection of personal essays and photography that explores love, acceptance, and self-discovery through the lens of her story as an autistic adult and the mother of an autistic child with highly intensive support needs.
- Be The One (2021): A collection of short passages and prose focused on themes of vulnerability, self-discovery, friendship, and deep feelings.
- And Yet—Here You Are (2024): A collection of poems about not giving up despite facing tough challenges.
