= Alycia Halladay =

American behavioral neuroscientist

Alycia Kay Halladay
- Other name: Alycia Halladay Ross
- Education: University of Texas at Austin; Rutgers University
- Occupation: Science researcher
- Known for: Autism research
- Spouse: Greg Ross
- Children: 2
- Scientific career
- Fields: Behavioral neuroscience
- Workplaces: Autism Science Foundation; Rutgers University; Autism Speaks (formerly); National Alliance for Autism Research (formerly)
- Thesis: Interaction of changes in dopamine signaling and expression of the Eph family tyrosine kinase receptors in mice (2001)

Alycia Kay Halladay is chief science officer at the Autism Science Foundation (ASF). Until 2014, she served as the senior director of environmental and clinical sciences for Autism Speaks. She originally joined the National Alliance for Autism Research in 2005 before it merged with Autism Speaks, and was named the associate director of research for environmental sciences in 2007. She also serves at an adjunct professor in the Pharmacology and Toxicology Department at Rutgers University.

== Family and education ==
After obtaining her bachelor's degree from the University of Texas at Austin, Halladay received her M.S. (1998) and Ph.D. (2001) in psychology, both from Rutgers University, where she completed a postdoctoral fellowship in pharmacology and toxicology.

Halladay and husband Greg Ross are the parents of fraternal twin daughters, one of whom is autistic. In 2015, Halladay stated that she had designated both children brain donors in the hope the post-mortem study of their brains would advance the scientific understanding of autism.

== Autism ==
At ASF, Halladay leads the science program, which includes pre- and post-doctoral fellowships and accelerator grants, as well as large-scale projects, including the Autism Sisters Project and the outreach and communications related to the Autism BrainNet brain-donation registry. She also has experience managing consortium and multidisciplinary initiatives, such as the Gene/Environment Interactions Initiative, the High Risk Baby Siblings Consortium and the Toddler Treatment Network. She was interviewed by Parade magazine in 2013, saying, "There are likely thousands of genes that contribute to risk. However, there are also some environmental factors that contribute to risk. These include maternal infection and certain chemical and medical exposures." She has also said that early intervention "can make a real lifetime of difference" with regard to improving symptoms of autism in children, and after a study on folic acid and autism was published in JAMA, Halladay said that taking folic acid during pregnancy was "a relatively inexpensive way that parents can take action to possibly prevent risk of tube birth defects and autism".
