= Apoorva Mandavilli =

US science writer and journalist

- Education: New York University; University of Wisconsin–Madison; Augustana College
- Occupation: Journalist
- Employer: The New York Times
- Known for: medical science articles
- Website: apoorvamandavilli.com

Apoorva Mandavilli is an American investigative journalist whose work has focused on medical science. During the COVID-19 pandemic, she joined The New York Times as a health and science writer. In the spring of 2019, she was writer-in-residence at the University of Wisconsin, where she joined a panel discussion on vaccine refusal while writing about containing a measles outbreak in Lowell, Massachusetts.

Mandavilli is known for her work on autism, most notably being the founding editor-in-chief of Spectrum, an online publication that stemmed from the Simons Foundation Autism Research Initiative and is now part of The Transmitter. She co-founded Culture Dish, an organization dedicated to enhancing diversity in science journalism, and is the founding chair of the Diversity Committee for the National Association of Science Writers.

Mandavilli was the 2019 winner of the Victor L. Cohn award for scientific journalism. She grew up in Southern India and speaks four Indian languages. She came to the United States to attend college at age 17.
