= Feda Almaliti =

American autism advocate (1977–2020)

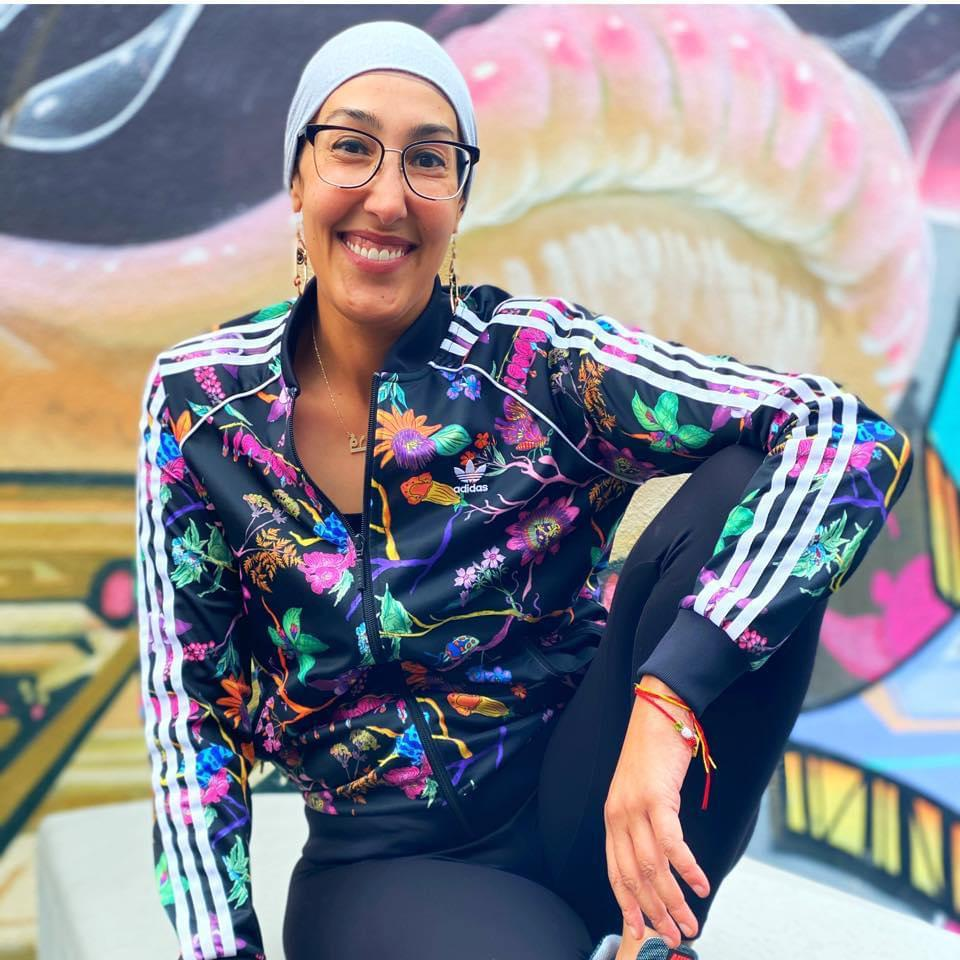
- Born: Feda Salah; September 21, 1977; Chicago, Illinois, U.S.
- Died: September 26, 2020 (aged 43); Fremont, California, U.S.
- Occupation: Autism advocate
- Children: 3

Feda Almaliti (née Salah; September 21, 1977 – September 26, 2020) was an American autism advocate, podcaster, and the co-founder of the National Council on Severe Autism.

== Biography ==
Almaliti was born in Chicago, Illinois.

Almaliti's public autism advocacy began when she challenged her insurer, Kaiser, which had refused to pay for treatments for her son's autism. Almaliti won the suit, and then worked to change California law to require health insurance to cover autism treatments.

Almaliti was a member of a group of parents who worked on California SB946, which significantly expanded autism health insurance coverage in California. Almaliti then became Insurance Chair of the Bay Area Autism Regional Taskforce. She was also Director of Outreach for the Mental Health & Autism Insurance Project.

Almaliti co-founded the National Council on Severe Autism along with Jill Escher, and served as vice president. The organization focused on the challenges specific to people with severe autism and their families and caretakers. It worked to educate the public and policy makers, promote research, and promote acceptance and awareness of autistic people.

Almaliti was the co-host of The Scoop, a podcast for parents of children with autism. The podcast was created to help other parents learn how to help people with autism.

== Views ==
Almaliti advocated for separate spaces for people with severe autism. She said that it was unrealistic to demand that people with severe autism be "mainstreamed" when their behavior was often likely to cause fear for others, for example at a public pool. Without these separate spaces, Almaliti argued, severely autistic people and their caretakers were likely to lead a life of isolation.

During the COVID-19 pandemic, Almaliti spoke publicly about the unique challenges of parenting a severely autistic child at such a difficult time. She said the lack of in-person instruction and in-person help made her child's life even more difficult, and noted that even before the pandemic, parents of autistic children suffered similar stress levels to combat soldiers. She also stated that it was not possible to get people with severe autism to wear masks.

Almaliti believed that people with mild autism should maintain a separate diagnosis of Asperger's syndrome rather than being reclassified as autistic. She believed that each issue required significantly different treatment.

Almaliti was a proponent of applied behavior analysis (ABA) as a treatment for severe autism. She championed the method in speeches, on her own podcast, and in other podcasts.

== Personal life ==
Almaliti had three sons: Ibrahim, Khalil, and Muhammed. Her youngest son, Muhammed, was severely autistic and inspired her advocacy work. One of her older sons has Asperger's syndrome.

== Death ==
Almaliti died while trying to rescue her son Muhammed from a house fire in Fremont, California, on September 26, 2020, five days after her 43rd birthday. Almaliti escaped the fire with her sister Maysoon and niece Anais, but died after she ran back into their burning home to try and rescue her son. She was found embracing Muhammed.

On October 19, 2020, the city of Fremont passed a resolution honoring Feda Almaliti.

In honor of Feda and Muhammed, the National Council on Severe Autism began the September 26th Project, focused on creating disaster preparedness plans.
