= Brian A. Gutierrez =

American politician and disability advocate

Brian Gutierrez
- Gutierrez in 2025

Member of the West Covina City Council from the 1st district
- Incumbent
- Assumed office November 2024

Personal details
- Born: June 6, 1990 (age 36) Boyle Heights, Los Angeles, California, U.S.
- Occupation: Politician
- Website: Official city biography

Brian Gutierrez is an American politician with Autism and disability advocate who has represented District 1 on the West Covina City Council since November 2024. His public service has included legislative liaison work, state disability-related appointments, local planning and federal emergency management.

In 2021, West Covina recognized Gutierrez's work with CVS Health in bringing four vaccination sites to the city. He won the District 1 council election in 2024 with 55.78 percent of the vote.

== Early life ==
Gutierrez entered the foster care system during childhood and experienced physical and emotional abuse. He is autistic. His city biography connects these experiences with his interest in disability advocacy and accessibility and recounts an instance in which a social worker doubted his prospects because of his autism.

== Public service and disability advocacy ==
=== Legislative and state service ===
Gutierrez worked as a legislative liaison and senior liaison in the California State Legislature before entering local elected office.

In 2013 and 2020, Gutierrez received state appointments related to developmental disabilities and disability access.

=== Advocacy and research review ===
Gutierrez has served as an ambassador for Autism Speaks, a role identified in a 2020 state appointment announcement. His advocacy has included disability-rights education, work with public agencies and community organizations, and mentoring individuals and families seeking services.

He has also served as a consumer reviewer for United States Department of Defense medical research programs, contributing a community perspective to the evaluation of proposed research.

== Federal emergency management ==
Gutierrez served with the Federal Emergency Management Agency. His responsibilities included coordination with government agencies, communication with congressional offices, and sharing information and resources during disaster response and recovery.

== Local government and community work ==
Before his election to the City Council, Gutierrez served in local planning. A 2021 city meeting record identified him in that role.

=== Vaccination access ===
On March 16, 2021, the City Council recognized Gutierrez for his work with CVS Health in bringing vaccination sites to West Covina. During the presentation, city officials credited him with contacting CVS's corporate office and maintaining communication as arrangements were made for four sites in the city. CVS Health was also recognized for its role.

== West Covina City Council (2024–present) ==
=== 2024 election ===
Gutierrez won the District 1 council seat in the November 5, 2024 election. He received 3,995 votes, or 55.78 percent, while Brian Calderón Tabatabai received 3,167 votes, or 44.22 percent. The city lists Gutierrez's council term as running from November 2024 to November 2028.

West Covina describes him as the first elected councilmember with autism in the city and the San Gabriel Valley.

2024 West Covina City Council election, District 1
Candidate	Votes	Percentage
Brian Gutierrez	3,995	55.78%
Brian Calderón Tabatabai	3,167	44.22%

=== Financial oversight ===
A city appointments list revised in April 2026 names Gutierrez as a member of its Audit Committee.

In August 2025, Gutierrez questioned Mayor Tony Wu about the city's partnership with the Chinese American Association of West Covina for the annual Moon Festival. He proposed a council vote supporting city control of the event. The San Gabriel Valley Tribune reported that the city had spent approximately $152,000 on the festival over the preceding two years.

Wu's wife was the association's unpaid chief financial officer. Wu disputed the city's cost calculations and denied receiving a financial benefit from the association. The association subsequently offered to transfer its portion of the event and funds raised for the 2025 festival to the city.

=== Contracting practices ===
In November 2025, Gutierrez questioned the evaluation of proposals for a city tree-service contract. He argued that the request-for-proposals process should have considered service costs alongside contractors' qualifications. Competing bidders alleged that the incumbent contractor had received preferential treatment.

== Policy positions ==
Gutierrez's published campaign platform called for additional public-safety personnel on patrol, repairs to streets and sidewalks, and improvements to parks and recreation facilities. It identified Del Norte Park, Orangewood Park, and sports facilities as priorities. His proposals also included expanded youth programs, sustainability and preservation of open space.

On economic development, Gutierrez advocated a more streamlined process for new businesses and promotion of shopping areas around Glendora Avenue and Plaza West Covina. His platform also called for improved transportation, healthcare and housing services for seniors and veterans, supported by applications for state and federal grants.
