= Children's Health Act =

Children's Health Act of 2000
- Long title: An Act to amend the Public Health Service Act with respect to children's health.
- Enacted by: the 106th United States Congress

Citations
- Public law: Pub. L. 106-310
- Statutes at Large: 114 Stat. 1101

Legislative history
- Introduced in the House as H.R. 4365 by Michael Bilirakis on May 3, 2000; Signed into law by President Bill Clinton on October 17, 2000

The Children's Health Act of 2000 (Pub. L. 106–310 (text) (PDF), 114 Stat. 1101, enacted October 17, 2000), signed by President Clinton on October 17, 2000, was brought into law to conduct a study focusing on children from before conception to 21 years of age. The law authorized the formation of federal child health funding programs and included a pediatric research initiative in the National Institutes of Health.

Seven existing Vanguard centers, located primarily at major research universities across the US, are scheduled to start enrolling pregnant women during 2008 as part of the planned National Children's Study. An additional twenty-two centers are slated to be added as part of the $3.2 billion project aimed at finding cures to some of the nation's most pressing health problems. The study will be the largest ever to look at the ways in which environment and genetics interact to influence child health and human development.

== Implications ==
The focus of this Act was to increase research and treatment of numerous health issues concerning children including autism, asthma, epilepsy, and oral health to name a few. Since it was implemented into law, the Children's Health Act has brought upon numerous programs. Some highlights of the Act include:

1. The Children's Day Care Health and Safety Act
2. The Safe Schools/Health Students Initiative
3. The Healthy Start Program
4. Efforts to ensure safe and quality mental health treatment

== Funding ==
The initial estimate of the cost of this study was approximately $2.7 billion over a span of 25 years. However, various media reports have concluded that the actual cost could be twice as much as the one that was initially predicted. Federal agencies, including the Eunice Kennedy Shriver National Institute of Child Health and Human Development, the National Institute of Environmental Health Sciences, the US Centers for Disease Control and Prevention, and the US Environmental Protection Agency.

The National Academy of Science had their share of input in the project that began its funding in 2000. However, during the planning phase, the study fell short of funding which, as a result, made people more doubtful about the possibility of the program. Over the years, funding has increased significantly, more so since 2007, when the implementation phase began. The 2010 reports show that $414.3 million has been secured and the program is still up and running and showing stability for the years to come.

== National Institute of Child Health and Human Development ==
Furthermore, to discover preventable environmental risk factors for disease in children, the US Congress engaged the National Institute of Child Health and Human Development with the Children's Health Act of 2000. The aim of this study was to track the health of 100 000 children from before conception to their 21st birthday and learn the influence of environment, including physical, chemical, biological, and psychosocial factors, on children's health and development.

== See also ==
- Combating Autism Act
