= Amy S.F. Lutz =

American historian of medicine and author

- Education: University of Pennsylvania BA, PhD; Indiana University Bloomington MA
- Occupation: Writer
- Website: amysflutz.com

Amy S.F. Lutz is an American author and parent-advocate best known for her works on the topic of autism. Since 2018, she has been the vice-president of the National Council on Severe Autism (NCSA) and founding member. In her published work she often uses her son Jonah as an example of an autistic person with highly intensive support needs. Lutz is the author of three books, Chasing the Intact Mind (2023), We Walk: Life with Severe Autism (2020), and Each Day I Like It Better: Autism, ECT, and the Treatment of Our Most Impaired Children (2014). She has written content for various publications, including The Atlantic, Psychology Today, The Washington Post and Slate. In March 2026, she was named to the Independent Autism Coordinating Committee, an advisory board created by Alison Singer of the Autism Science Foundation amid concerns that United States Secretary of Health and Human Services Robert F. Kennedy Jr. had politicized the key federal autism advisory boards.

She is a senior lecturer at the University of Pennsylvania, a position she has held since at least 2023.

== Early life and education ==
Lutz received her master's degree in 1997 from Indiana University Bloomington in fiction writing, a career path she pursued for years before giving it up, saying "[I]t just seemed a little self-indulgent. There was really nothing at stake. Nobody's lives were really impacted by what was unfolding ... as opposed to the really consequential things I was struggling with in my own life, raising a child with severe autism." She entered the PhD program at the University of Pennsylvania already a published author of Each Day I Like It Better. Her advisor there was Beth Linker. In 2022, she received her PhD from the University of Pennsylvania in the history and sociology of science.

As of 2023 Lutz teaches "bioethics and the history of medicine."

== Autism-related advocacy ==
=== Rejection of the intact mind beliefs ===
Much of Lutz's research and writing is critical of the theory of an "intact mind" within the autism community. That is the idea that autistic people have "a typical or superior intelligence ... [and] severe cognitive impairment" does not exist, but that there is just a part of the brain that is inaccessible. Thus, people who believe that their severely disabled children have an "intact mind", hope that, with the right treatment, their children will grow up to live independently, to communicate, and to function normally in society. Lutz rejects this idea, saying:

This idea of the independent autonomous person that at the core of a liberal democracy like ours is kind of a mess. It’s very gendered, besides being very ableist, and it’s very white. The liberal subject is imagined as this white, healthy, heterosexual male who doesn’t need any help with anything, and that really isn’t a subject that exists in real life. That’s what makes us human: is that we are all kind of interdependent. There isn’t anybody who doesn’t need some kind of support, and so we shouldn’t really judge people for the types of support that they need.

Lutz said "Nothing is more predicated on the intact mind than facilitated communication because the whole enterprise hinges on this idea that there is a normal or even genius-level intellect trapped inside."

=== Other autism-related advocacy ===
Lutz opposes the neurodiversity paradigm and is critical of those who treat autism as "an identity, not a disorder". She claims this type of framing leaves autistic people with highly intensive support needs and their families out of the discussion.

In her 2020 We Walk book, Lutz talked about the phenomenon of inspiration porn, such as viral videos of a cheerleader taking an autistic teen to the prom. Lutz does not see these videos as a show of pity, but rather as a show of kindness, "which is something that should be applauded always."

Lutz discussed Jonah's treatments, as well as case studies of other autistic people with highly intensive support needs, in her 2014 book, Each Day I Like It Better. In Jonah's case, by the time he was 10, he had attacked family and helpers, and he was violent not only to others but himself. He had been treated with applied behavior analysis and medications, but with limited effect. As he aged and became larger and closer to puberty (which would make him more difficult to manage), the family turned to electroconvulsive therapy (ECT). Initially, ECT was needed three times a week, but, over time, Jonah was weaned from ECT to where he is stabilized at three treatments a month. After treatment, he was back to school and family trips and "had virtually no outbursts and much improved mood". In 2025, Lutz stated that Jonah, then 26, was "doing very well ... he is happy and thriving". Lutz believes that "ECT provided life-changing degrees of improvement."

In April 2025, Lutz wrote an op-ed for Persuasion responding to controversial statements about the autistic community made by prominent anti-vaccine activist and recently appointed U.S. Secretary of Health and Human Services Robert F. Kennedy Jr. In the article, Lutz characterized Kennedy's comments—specifically his assertions that autistic people would never pay taxes, play baseball, write a poem, go on a date, or use the toilet unassisted—as "benign" when interpreted as applying only to autistic people with highly intensive support needs. Lutz criticized Senator Elizabeth Warren for labeling Kennedy's characterization of autistic people "disgusting," claiming that it was equivalent to calling her son and those like him disgusting. Lutz also criticized Holly Robinson Peete for pushing back on Kennedy's claim that "autism destroys families," accusing the actress of not acknowledging that families like hers and Lutz's had the skills and resources to avoid such destruction. Lutz stated, "...[I]t neither dilutes nor defangs our advocacy to thank Secretary Kennedy for shining a light on the segment of the autism spectrum that has been increasingly marginalized by a focus on the most capable, and to agree that this very vulnerable and impaired population must be foregrounded in our national conversations about autism research, policy, and practice." Lutz said she did not defend Kennedy unconditionally and acknowledged that he was wrong to claim vaccines caused autism, hire discredited anti-vaccine activist David Geier to spearhead research, and promise to determine the causes of autism within five months.

=== Organizations ===
Lutz was one of the founders of the National Council on Severe Autism (NCSA).

Lutz also serves on the Independent Autism Coordinating Committee which was formed by some scientists, former members of a key advisory panel, and some autism organizations in response to Kennedy appointing all new members to a key federal advisory panel.

== Publications ==
As of December 2025, Scopus lists 11 publications by Lutz, which have been cited 124 times and a h-index of 5.

=== Books ===
- Chasing the Intact Mind: How the Severely Autistic and Intellectually Disabled Were Excluded from the Debates That Affect Them Most (2023). Oxford University Press. ISBN 978-0197683842.
- We Walk: Life with Severe Autism (2020). ILR Press. ISBN 978-1501751394.
- Each Day I Like It Better: Autism, ECT, and the Treatment of Our Most Impaired Children (2014). Vanderbilt University Press. ISBN 978-0826503558.

=== Selected articles ===
- Bioethicists Should Speak Up Against Facilitated Communication. with Dominic Sisti. July 29, 2024. The Hastings Center for Bioethics.
- I'm tired of disability activists pretending my son doesn't exist. November 8, 2023. The Washington Post.
- What the Heck Is ABA, Anyway?. May 16, 2021. Psychology Today.
- Who Decides Where Autistic Adults Live?. May 26, 2015. The Atlantic.
- Where Should Special Needs Kids Be Special?. March 16, 2013. Slate magazine.

== Personal life ==
She lives outside Philadelphia with her husband and five children.
