= The Transmitter =

American neuroscience website

- Editor-in-chief: Ivan Oransky
- Categories: Science journalism
- Publisher: Simons Foundation
- Founded: November 13, 2023; 2 years ago
- Country: United States
- Language: English
- Website: thetransmitter.org

The Transmitter is an online publication dedicated to neuroscience research news and commentary. Aimed at professionals from across the neuroscience discipline, the website is an editorially-independent publication of the Simons Foundation.

== History ==
=== Spectrum ===
In 2008, the Simons Foundation Autism Research Initiative website debuted a News & Opinion section, which relaunched as Spectrum magazine in 2015. The online publication was dedicated to new findings in autism spectrum disorder research. It was funded by the Simons Foundation.

=== The Transmitter ===
The Spectrum editorial team founded The Transmitter to expand the publication's neuroscience coverage beyond the autism field; autism stories are covered on The Transmitter within a dedicated Spectrum vertical. Like its predecessor, The Transmitter is funded by the Simons Foundation but maintains editorial independence. The new website was launched on November 13, 2023, with an announcement at a satellite event hosted by the Simons Foundation during the 2023 Society for Neuroscience meeting in Washington, D.C.

== Editors-in-chief ==
Editor-in-chief	Editor from	Editor to
Apoorva Mandavilli	2015	2020
Ivan Oransky	2020	–

== Leadership ==
=== Editorial staff ===
- Ivan Oransky, editor-in-chief
- Kristin Ozelli, executive editor
- Nicholette Zeliadt, managing editor
- Nektaria Pastellas, director of marketing and engagement
- Emily Singer, opinion and community editor
- Brady Huggett, enterprise editor

=== Contributing editors ===
- Adrienne Fairhall, professor of physiology and biophysics at the University of Washington
- André Fenton, professor of neural science at New York University
- Daniel Geschwind, professor of neurology at University of California, Los Angeles
- Sheena Josselyn, senior scientist at The Hospital for Sick Children
- Russell Poldrack, professor of psychology at Stanford University
- Nicole Rust, professor of psychology at the University of Pennsylvania
- Joshua Sanes, neurobiologist and founding director of the Center for Brain Science at Harvard University
- Anthony Zador, professor of biology at Cold Spring Harbor Laboratory

=== Advisory board ===
- Deborah Blum, director of the Knight Science Journalism Program at the Massachusetts Institute of Technology
- Marion Greenup, special advisor for the Simons Foundation Autism Research Institute
- David Gresham, professor of biology at New York University
- Laura Helmuth, editor-in-chief of Scientific American
- Rebecca Jones, senior clinical research scientist at Imagen Technologies
- Robin Marantz Henig, contributing writer for The New York Times Magazine
- Temitayo Oyegbile-Chidi, associate professor of neurology at University of California, Davis
- Jason Penchoff, senior director of marketing and communications at Memorial Sloan Kettering Cancer Center

== See also ==
- Quanta Magazine, a publication dedicated to science and mathematics also supported by the Simons Foundation
