= Ivan Oransky =

American medical researcher and journalist

Ivan Oransky is an American physician and journalist. He co-founded the blog Retraction Watch in 2010 to document retractions in academic publishing and has since campaigned for greater transparency and accountability in research publishing. He is known for his advocacy of scientific integrity by tracking research misconduct and promoting institutional reforms.

== Education and career ==
Oransky graduated cum laude with a B.A. in biology from Harvard College in 1994, where he served as executive editor of The Harvard Crimson. He obtained his M.D. from the New York University School of Medicine in 1998, where he served during his studies as editor-in-chief of "Pulse", the medical student section of the Journal of the American Medical Association.

Oransky has held senior editorial positions including deputy editor of The Scientist (2004–2008), managing editor for online content at Scientific American (2008–2009), executive editor of Reuters Health (2009–2013), vice president and global editorial director of MedPage Today (2013–2017), and vice president of editorial at Medscape (2018–2020). From 2017 to 2021, he served as president of the Association of Health Care Journalists. He has also taught medical journalism at New York University since 2002 and taught at the City University of New York's Graduate School of Journalism from 2007 to 2009.

In August 2010, Oransky and Adam Marcus launched the blog Retraction Watch, a project of the Center for Scientific Integrity. It aggregates daily reports of article retractions, analyzes the causes of misconduct or error, and has become an influential resource for researchers, publishers, and librarians.

Oransky serves as Distinguished Journalist in Residence at New York University's Arthur Carter Journalism Institute, where he teaches medical journalism in the Science, Health, and Environmental Reporting Program. Since 2020, he has been editor-in-chief of The Transmitter, a neuroscience publication by the Simons Foundation.

Oransky also serves as executive director of the Center for Scientific Integrity, a 501(c)(3) nonprofit dedicated to promoting transparency and integrity in science and scientific publishing. In this role, he oversees the Retraction Watch database, directs scholarship on scientific integrity, manages long-form investigative projects, and coordinates outreach to researchers, publishers, and policymakers to advance best practices in research accountability.

== Awards ==
Oransky has received recognition for his work. In 2015, he received the John P. McGovern Award for excellence in biomedical communication from the American Medical Writers Association. In 2017, he was awarded an honorary doctorate in civil laws by The University of the South (Sewanee). In 2019, he received a commendation from the judges of the John Maddox Prize for his work at Retraction Watch promoting those who stand up for science in the face of hostility.

== Impact of Retraction Watch ==
Retraction Watch's 2024 year-end report shows it had a record 7.5 million pageviews, a 15% increase over its previous high, set in 2015, and its database—which is now part of Crossref—catalogues just under 55,000 retraction entries. Its investigative work and commentary were picked up by major news outlets, including the BBC, The Guardian, Le Monde, Nature, NBC News, The New York Times, and USA Today, illustrating its broad influence on scientific and public discourse.

== Publications and public talks ==
In 2011, Oransky and Adam Marcus coauthored an article in Nature pointing out that the peer review process for scholarly publications continues long after the publication time. In 2014, Oransky coauthored an article in Nature that describes how several authors were caught reviewing their own papers.

In 2012, Oransky gave a talk at TEDMED titled "Are we overmedicalized?", in which he discussed the epidemic of medical "preconditions" and warned against overtreatment in healthcare.

In 2018, Oransky and Marcus profiled in Science magazine two researchers whose investigative work to find inconsistencies in published data has been instrumental in catalyzing retractions.

In August 2023, Oransky and Marcus coauthored op-eds in Scientific American and The Guardian. In the wake of the resignation of Stanford University president Marc Tessier-Lavigne, Oransky and Marcus suggested that scientific misconduct is more common than is reported. They also assess that, despite recent scandals involving research misconduct, the academic community is uninterested in exposing wrongdoing and scientific errors, but that all members of the academic community are responsible for the delays and lack of action.
