= Julianne Dalcanton =

American astronomer

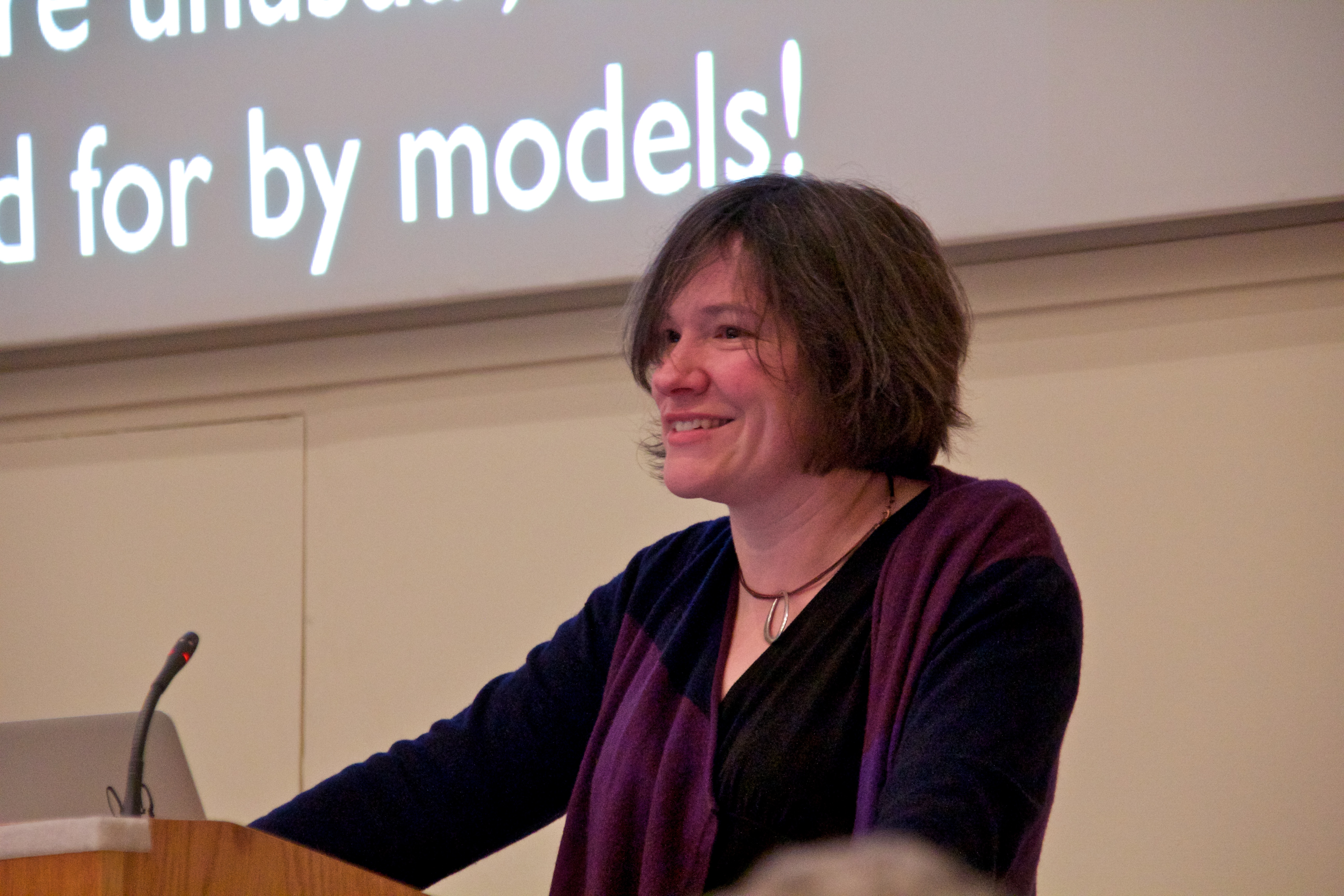
Julianne Dalcanton presenting at the Royal Astronomical Society in 2012.

Julianne Dalcanton (born 1968) is an American astrophysicist and the director of the Flatiron Institute's Center for Computational Astrophysics (CCA) at the Simons Foundation. Her research focuses on the origins and evolution of galaxies, particularly through resolved stellar populations. She is one of the largest single users of the Hubble Space Telescope, most notably as principal investigator of the Panchromatic Hubble Andromeda Treasury (PHAT), a large Multicycle Treasury program. She is also known for her discovery of the comet C/1999 F2 Dalcanton.

== Education and career ==
Dalcanton earned a bachelor's degree in physics from the Massachusetts Institute of Technology and a Ph.D. in astrophysical sciences from Princeton University in 1995. She completed postdoctoral training at the Observatories of the Carnegie Institution of Washington.

Dalcanton joined the faculty of the University of Washington, where she became Professor of Astronomy and Adjunct Professor of Physics. She served as Chair of the Astronomy Department. Her research group led several major Hubble Space Telescope programs, including the ACS Nearby Galaxy Survey Treasury (ANGST) and the Panchromatic Hubble Andromeda Treasury (PHAT).

In September 2021, Dalcanton joined the Simons Foundation as Director of the Flatiron Institute's Center for Computational Astrophysics (CCA) in New York City.

== Awards and honors ==
- Alfred P. Sloan Research Fellowship
- National Science Foundation CAREER Award
- Wyckoff Faculty Fellowship, University of Washington College of Arts and Sciences
- Mohler Prize, University of Michigan
- Beatrice M. Tinsley Prize, American Astronomical Society, 2018, for "contributions that are of an exceptionally creative or innovative character and that have played a seminal role in furthering our understanding of the universe"
- Elected Member, American Academy of Arts and Sciences, 2024
- Asteroid 148384 Dalcanton, discovered by the Sloan Digital Sky Survey in 2000, was named in her honor. The official naming citation was published by the Minor Planet Center on 6 April 2012 (M.P.C. 79106).

== Seelected publications ==
- Dalcanton, Julianne J.; Spergel, David N.; Summers, F. J. (1997). "The Formation of Disk Galaxies". The Astrophysical Journal. 482 (2): 659–676. arXiv:astro-ph/9611226. Bibcode:1997ApJ...482..659D. doi:10.1086/304182.
- Hogan, Craig J.; Dalcanton, Julianne J. (2000). "New dark matter physics: Clues from halo structure". Physical Review D. 62 (6) 063511. arXiv:astro-ph/0002330. Bibcode:2000PhRvD..62f3511H. doi:10.1103/PhysRevD.62.063511.
- Debby Tran, Benjamin Williams, Emily Levesque, Margaret Lazzarini, Julianne Dalcanton, Andrew Dolphin, Brad Koplitz, Adam Smercina, and O. Grace Telford. (2023). "Spatially Resolved Recent Star Formation History in NGC 6946".
