= Combating Autism Act =

Act of the 109th United States Congress

- Long title: An Act to amend the Public Health Service Act to combat autism through research, screening, intervention and education.
- Enacted by: the 109th United States Congress

Citations
- Public law: Pub. L. 109–416 (text) (PDF)
- Statutes at Large: 120 Stat. 2821

Codification
- Acts amended: Public Health Service Act

Legislative history
- Introduced in the Senate by Rick Santorum (R-PA) and Chris Dodd (D-CT) on April 19, 2005; Committee consideration by Senate Health, Education, Labor, and Pensions Committee; Passed the Senate on August 3, 2006; Passed the House on December 6, 2006 (voice vote) with amendment; Senate agreed to House amendment on December 7, 2006 (unanimous consent); Signed into law by President George W. Bush on December 19, 2006

The Combating Autism Act of 2006 (Public Law No: 109-416) is an act of Congress public law that was passed by the 109th United States Congress (Senate Bill 843) and was signed into law by President George W. Bush on December 19, 2006. It authorized nearly one billion dollars in expenditures over five years, starting in 2007, for screening, education, early intervention, prompt referrals for treatment and services, and research of the autism spectrum disorders of autism, Asperger syndrome, Rett syndrome, childhood disintegrative disorder, and pervasive developmental disorder - not otherwise specified (commonly referred to as PDD-NOS).

== Legislative history ==
The bill was introduced in the Senate by Senators Rick Santorum, R-PA and Christopher Dodd, D-CT and passed the upper chamber unanimously in August 2006.

The House version, H.R. 2421, was introduced by Congresswomen Mary Bono, R-CA and Diana DeGette, D-CO and was passed by the lower chamber on December 6, 2006. The House version differed slightly from the Senate version, directing funds for research to the Secretary of Health and Human Services, rather than directly to the National Institutes of Health.

"By passing this landmark single-disease legislation, the House has recognized the daily plight of the thousands of families struggling every day with autism, and has once and for all acknowledged autism as a national healthcare crisis", said Bob Wright, co-founder of Autism Speaks and chairman and CEO of NBC Universal.

The House passed a version that would grant more authority to scientists to determine research priorities, whereas the Senate's original measure would have included funds for expansion of research into the causes of autism. The revised bill, ultimately approved by the Senate, did not include the provisions that would have specified funding for investigating possible environmental causes.

"This bill is a federal declaration of war on the epidemic of autism", said Jon Shestack, co-founder of Cure Autism Now. "It creates a congressionally mandated road map for a federal assault on autism, including requirements for strategic planning, budget transparency, Congressional oversight, and a substantial role for parents of children with autism in the federal decision-making process."

== Provisions ==
The Act provides money for the Centers for Disease Control (CDC) to conduct epidemiological surveillance programs and would re-authorize the Interagency Autism Coordinating Committee (IACC) to coordinate all efforts within the Department of Health and Human Services concerning autism, including activities carried out through the National Institutes of Health (NIH) and the CDC.

The Combating Autism Act allocates approximately $950 million in spending on autism over five years, approximately doubling expenditures on existing programs; this includes a significant increase in spending for biomedical research in autism.

The Act requires the director of NIH to develop and implement a strategic plan for autism research and a budget to fund this plan. The plan and budget would have to take into account recommendations of a public/private committee, the Interagency Autism Coordinating Committee, which itself would have to include at least one-third public members, a person with autism, and a person who is the parent of a child with autism. The act provides grant programs for states to develop autism screening, early diagnosis, and intervention programs for children.

The act also authorizes:

- The Director of the NIH to create an "Autism Czar", who would coordinate NIH based-research and oversee development and budgeting of autism research and would increase the number of Centers of Excellence on Autism from eight to ten.
- An information and education program and its risk factors to be provided by the Department of Health and Human Services (HHS) to health professionals and the general public.
- Commitment of $75 million a year by the Health Resources and Services Administration (HRSA), for each of the next five years, for grants for states to develop autism screening, diagnosis, and intervention programs, and to create statewide screening systems to ensure all children are screened for autism by the age of two.
- $25 million a year, for five years, for technical assistance and data management to states for autism screening, diagnosis and intervention programs.

The Act reauthorizes, for five years, the $12 million annual funding for the epidemiological surveillance program for autism, overseen by the Centers for Disease Control (CDC).

== Provision removed from Senate version ==
The final version of the Combating Autism Act passed by the House and Senate eliminated a provision, originally included in the Senate bill, that would have created a legal requirement for Centers of Excellence in Environmental Health and autism to research "a broad array of environmental factors that may have a possible role in autism spectrum disorders." These Centers would have authorized with funding of $45 million over the five-year life of the bill.

== Criticism ==
The Autistic Self Advocacy Network (ASAN) has criticized the Combating Autism Act. Their belief is that the "'War on Autism' approach is not in the interests of people on the [autistic] spectrum" and that it "offends and alienates the autistic community". Instead of attempts to "cure" autism, ASAN advocates other methods, such as better educational resources, to improve the quality of life for autistic people.
