= Autism Science Foundation =

U.S. nonprofit organization

- Abbreviation: ASF
- Founded: March 23, 2009; 17 years ago
- Founders: Alison Singer; Karen Margulis London
- Tax ID no.: 26-4522309
- Legal status: 501(c)(3) non-profit organization
- Headquarters: Scarsdale, New York, United States
- President: Alison Singer
- Chief Science Officer: Alycia Halladay Ross
- Scientific Advisory Board Chair: James McPartland, PhD
- Board of directors: Jonah Zimiles (Chair); Joseph P. Joyce (Secretary); Bryan Harkins (Treasurer); Lucy Hatchell; Dr. Paul A. Offit; Michael Lewis; Alison Singer
- Revenue: $2,579,702 (2024)
- Expenses: $1,457,862 (2024)
- Employees: 6 (2024)
- Volunteers: 30 (2024)
- Website: www.autismsciencefoundation.org

The Autism Science Foundation (ASF) is an American non-profit organization whose stated goals are to fund evidence-based autism research and support families with autistic members. The organization was founded in March 2009 by Alison Singer, a former senior executive of Autism Speaks and then a member of the Interagency Autism Coordinating Committee (IACC), and Karen Margulis London, a co-founder of the National Alliance for Autism Research (NAAR). Both Singer and London are parents of autistic individuals. Singer also has an autistic sibling.

== Formation ==
ASF was created as a split from Autism Speaks, which assigned a high priority to investigating the debunked claim that vaccines make people autistic. This focus raised concerns among parents and researchers.

Singer, a senior executive of Autism Speaks, resigned in January 2009 rather than vote for committing money to new research studies into vaccination and autism. The IACC (of which Singer was periodically a member between 2007 and 2019) voted against committing the research funds; this was contrary to the Autism Speaks policy on vaccine safety research. Singer said:

"There isn't an unlimited pot of money, and every dollar spent looking where we know the answer isn't is one less dollar we have to spend where we might find new answers. The fact is that vaccines save lives; they don't cause autism."

Singer noted that numerous scientific studies already disproved the link first suggested more than a decade ago and that Autism Speaks needs to "move on." Later that year, along with NAAR cofounder Karen London, Singer launched ASF as a nonprofit organization supporting autism research premised on the principles that autism has a strong genetic component, that vaccines do not cause autism, and that early diagnosis and intervention are critical.

Eric London resigned from Autism Speaks' Scientific Affairs Committee in June 2009, saying that arguments that "there might be rare cases of 'biologically plausible' vaccine involvement ... are misleading and disingenuous", and that Autism Speaks was "adversely impacting" autism research. London is a founding member of the ASF's Scientific Advisory Board.

== Activities ==
ASF offers numerous funding opportunities for scientists. The organization offers pre- and postdoctoral fellowships, two-year post undergraduate fellowships, medical school gap year fellowships, and undergraduate summer research awards.

On January 5, 2011, Brian Deer published the first part of his British Medical Journal series on Andrew Wakefield's "elaborate fraud" which started the dubious MMR vaccine controversy. On January 7, 2011, Singer was interviewed by Kiran Chetry on CNN's American Morning. Singer discussed the repercussions of Deer's report, stating, "...we can finally put the question of autism and vaccines behind us."

In 2025, speaking in her capacity as president of ASF, Singer reiterated that vaccines do not make people autistic, while also stating that she gave credit to recently appointed U.S. Secretary of Health and Human Services and anti-vaccine activist Robert F. Kennedy, Jr. for "wanting to study the causes of autism." In a subsequent interview, Singer labeled Kennedy a "data denier," while also stating that she believed he had empathy for families of autistic people with highly intensive support needs and genuinely wanted to help them. Singer also claimed that Kennedy agreed with her position that disproportionate focus was being placed on autistic people with less intensive support needs.

=== Applied behavior analysis ===
ASF has promoted the use of applied behavior analysis (ABA), a controversial operant-conditioning system primarily used to modify the behavior of autistic people.

The use of ABA on autistic children was popularized by UCLA psychology professor Ole Ivar Lovaas, who used electric shocks and other physical punishments on some of his test subjects (including both autistic and queer children) and once stated that he believed autistic people were human in physical form only and needed to be psychologically constructed. Lovaas' goal was to make autistic children indistinguishable from their peers academically and socially, and he claimed that intensive, longterm ABA administered at a young age resulted in the "recovery" of some of his autistic test subjects.

ABA is widely opposed within the autistic rights movement. Its critics (including many people who have undergone ABA themselves) have argued it is abusive, traumatizing, dehumanizing, pseudoscientific and not genuinely collaborative or supportive. They have also argued that changes in the way it's practiced (such as punishments and food reinforcers being less commonly used) have not made ABA positive or benign.

ASF has rejected criticism of ABA as outdated or misinformed and dismissed those who oppose its use or view it negatively as a statistically irrelevant minority. Singer has claimed ABA benefited her autistic daughter and suggested that the historical approach of recommending it to all autistic children (including those without communication delays or co-occurring intellectual disabilities) may have been harmful and resulted in a negative perception of ABA amongst those harmed. She has also claimed that any autistic people able to "articulate a nuanced criticism" of ABA's philosophy and methodology "don't really need ABA" and accused such critics of trying to speak for all autistic people.

=== Brain donation ===
In 2012, speaking in her capacity as president of ASF, Singer encouraged parents to designate their autistic children brain donors through Autism Speaks' Autism Tissue Program. Singer claimed she had designated her own autistic daughter a donor in the hope the post-mortem study of her brain would lead to the development of medical treatments that would "enhance the lives" of other autistic people. The same year, the Simons Foundation Autism Research Initiative (SFARI) awarded Singer and ASF a grant to promote SFARI's Autism BrainNet brain donation registry. Singer and ASF launched a promotional campaign paid for by the grant in May 2014, which SFARI credited with a substantial uptick in donor registrations for the remainder of the calendar year. ASF leadership has continued to promote the registry in subsequent years.

In 2015, ASF's chief science officer, Alycia Halladay Ross, stated that she had designated her twin daughters (one of whom is autistic) brain donors through Autism BrainNet.

=== Prevention of autism ===
On April 17, 2025, the Autistic Self Advocacy Network and five other organizations cosigned an open letter criticizing the Trump administration's policies they highlighted as negatively impacting the autistic community, including the promotion of the false claim that there was a causal link between vaccines and autism. The letter also stated the administration's claim that autism was preventable ran counter to scientific consensus and perpetuated stigma, which Singer later claimed made ASF leadership unwilling to cosign it. Singer explained, "[T]here was a focus in that letter that we shouldn't be focusing science on prevention, and we believe strongly that we should." The idea that the scientific community should work to prevent autism (or disability more generally) is controversial and has been labeled eugenic by some observers and critics.

== Funding ==
Vaccinologist Dr. Paul Offit, a founding board member of ASF, donates all royalties from his book Deadly Choices to the organization. ASF also receives royalties from paperback sales of Offit's previous book, Autism's False Prophets.

ASF is also the recipient of funds raised through Wall Street Rides FAR, the annual cycling and walking event that originated in White Plains, New York and has expanded to include satellite rides in other cities, including Baltimore, Chicago and Toronto.

== Scientific advisory board ==
ASF has 17 scientific advisory board members, including Ami Klin and Catherine Lord.

== See also ==
- List of autism-related topics
