= Interactive Autism Network =

Defunct autism research registry

The Interactive Autism Network (IAN) was an autism-focused research registry that matched researchers and their studies to members of the public who wished to participate. IAN was established in 2006 at the Kennedy Krieger Institute (KKI) by Paul and Kiely Law (the parents of an autistic son) and was funded by Autism Speaks and the Simons Foundation.

The registry was officially decommissioned on June 30, 2019, with an archived version (less any personally identifiable participant information) maintained by KKI. KKI also took responsibility for archiving approximately 1,000 articles written by IAN staff. At the time, IAN cost approximately $1.5 million to operate annually and was experiencing a significant decline in public participation and researcher fee revenue. Because of these difficulties, the Simons Foundation chose to instead prioritize the funding of its in-house autism-related research registry, SPARK. Over the course of its existence, IAN enrolled approximately 60,000 participants (including approximately 26,000 autistic ones).
