= Alison Singer =

Nonprofit founder and former TV network executive

- Born: 1966 or 1967 (age 58–59)
- Other names: Alison Lee Tepper; Alison Tepper Singer
- Education: Yale University; Harvard University (MBA)
- Occupation: President of a non-profit organization
- Known for: Autism Science Foundation; Autism Speaks
- Spouse: Daniel M. Singer (married 1994-present)
- Children: 2
- Website: www.autismsciencefoundation.org

Alison Singer (née Tepper; born 1966 or 1967) is the president and co-founder of the Autism Science Foundation (ASF), a non-profit organization primarily focused on funding and advocating for medical research related to autism. She also periodically served on the Interagency Autism Coordinating Committee (IACC) between 2007 and 2019. Singer was vice president of programming for the cable and business development division of NBC from 1994 to 1999 and held multiple leadership roles at the non-profit organization Autism Speaks between 2005 and 2009.

Throughout her non-profit career, Singer has been generally supportive of the medical model of disability (particularly in the context of autism) and generally critical of the autistic rights and neurodiversity movements.

== Family and education ==
Singer is the daughter of Rita and Gerald Tepper. She has an older autistic brother, Steven, who was institutionalized at Willowbrook State School as a child before being moved to Letchworth Village, and one younger brother. According to Singer, her mother encouraged her to only publicly acknowledge the existence of her younger brother. She has since become Steven's legal guardian.

Singer and husband Daniel married in 1994 at ages 27 and 29, respectively.

Singer has two daughters: Jodie (the oldest, born in 1997, who is autistic) and Lauren. According to Singer, when Lauren was due to receive the MMR vaccine in 1999, she chose to instead follow anti-vaccine activist Andrew Wakefield's advice and separately administer vaccines for each disease it protected against. Singer claimed she did so in the hope it would reduce Lauren's likelihood of being autistic like Jodie, but subsequently recognized that her decision only placed Lauren's health at risk.

Singer graduated Yale University magna cum laude and earned a Master of Business Administration at Harvard University. She received an honorary degree from Emory University in May 2020.

== Research and advocacy ==
In 2005, Autism Speaks co-founders Bob and Suzanne Wright hired Singer as the organization's first employee and named her its interim chief executive. Singer was serving as senior vice president of communications and strategy when she resigned from the organization in 2009. Singer co-founded ASF later that year.

Singer resigned from Autism Speaks because she did not believe it should spend any additional money on studying the scientifically discredited link between the MMR vaccine and autism or influence others to do so. At Autism Speaks, she was in a far more influential position and helped that organization become well known. During Singer's entire tenure at Autism Speaks, one of the organization's primary goals was to cure autistic people.

In 2010, Singer developed the C.A.S.E. approach as a means for clinicians to address vaccine hesitancy immediately and during the clinical encounter in which the hesitancy is raised. C.A.S.E. stands for Corroborate, About Me, Science, and Explain/Advise. With the C.A.S.E. approach, the clinician frames a response to the vaccine hesitant patient that corroborates awareness of the patient's hesitancy while identifying a shared underlying value or concern. Next, the clinician makes an about me statement, describing how the clinician went about getting a scientific answer to the concern. The clinician then summarizes the science underlying the recommendation and/or explanation addressing said concerns. Finally, the clinician explains the clinician's advice to the patient. The C.A.S.E. approach then might only consist of four sentences altogether, but it connects the patient to the clinician through the shared value or concern (corroborate), recognizes and employs the professional standing of the clinician (about me), relies on science to address the concern (science), and allows the clinician to reframe the recommendation addressing the concern of the patient (explain/advise).

In 2013, Singer appeared in a Harvard Business School (HBS) alumnus profile, in which she claimed to be building a "pipeline of scientists" whom she expected to determine the cause(s) of autism within 10–15 years. She also said she learned the skills needed to run ASF during her time at HBS.

In 2024, speaking in her capacity as president of ASF, Singer defended the use of applied behavior analysis (a controversial operant-conditioning system widely opposed within the autistic rights movement) on autistic people with highly intensive support needs, including her own daughter. Singer claimed that critics were mostly autistic people with no communication delays or co-occurring intellectual disabilities who were wrongly recommended it as children. Singer had made similar statements on the topic in 2022, claiming that autistic people able to "articulate a nuanced criticism" of applied behavior analysis weren't among those who "really need[ed]" it. ASF, itself, has dismissed criticism of applied behavior analysis as outdated or misinformed and critics as part of a statistically irrelevant minority.

In 2025, speaking in her capacity as president of ASF, Singer reiterated that vaccines do not make people autistic, while also stating that she gave credit to recently appointed U.S. Secretary of Health and Human Services and anti-vaccine activist Robert F. Kennedy, Jr. for "wanting to study the causes of autism." In a subsequent interview, Singer labeled Kennedy a "data denier," while also stating that she believed he had empathy for families of autistic people with highly intensive support needs and genuinely wanted to help them. Singer added that Kennedy agreed with her position that disproportionate focus was being placed on autistic people with less intensive support needs. Also in 2025, Singer pushed back on criticism of Kennedy's claim that autism was preventable, stating that ASF leadership "believe[d] strongly" that scientific research related to autism should be focused on prevention. The idea that the scientific community should work to prevent autism (or disability more generally) is a controversial one and has been labeled eugenic by some observers and critics.

Singer serves on the executive boards of the Marcus Autism Center at Emory, the Yale Child Study Center, the Seaver Autism Center at the Icahn School of Medicine and the Autism Research Center at the University of North Carolina at Chapel Hill.

== Other views ==
In 2009, Singer claimed she supported some of the goals of Autistic activists she had previously spoken with, but disagreed with any opposition to genetic research.

In 2013, Singer criticized unnamed members of the neurodiversity movement for opposition to medical research that she believed would benefit her autistic daughter. She also claimed they had influenced the strategic plan of the IACC so that it suggested allocating some funds to study issues most relevant to autistic people with less intensive support needs (such as employment), money she believed would be better spent studying issues most relevant to autistic people with highly intensive support needs (such as how to best treat self-injurious behavior).

In 2017, Singer stated that she believed autistic people with less intensive support needs were overrepresented in media to the detriment of the "most vulnerable." She also lamented that all autistic diagnoses were rolled into autism spectrum disorder in 2013 with the release of the fifth edition of the Diagnostic and Statistical Manual of Mental Disorders, claiming that this harmed the ability of medical professionals to provide personalized care and advocating for the adoption of new subtype labels. Singer echoed these sentiments in 2021 and subsequent years, when she advocated for the adoption of "profound autism" as a new label to describe autistic people with highly intensive support needs. In 2021, Singer also served on a commission organized by The Lancet, which recommended the label's formal adoption by the medical community. However, the proposed adoption has been met with resistance by some Autistic activists, caregivers, researchers and medical professionals, who believe it would not be medically useful and would instead be reductive, stigmatizing, segregating or otherwise harmful.

In 2019, Singer joined the nascent National Council on Severe Autism (NCSA) as its treasurer. Similar to Singer's push for "profound autism," the NCSA has suggested the medical community adopt "severe autism" as a label to describe autistic people with highly intensive support needs. The organization also embraces the medical model of disability in the context of autism, rejects the validity of the autistic rights and neurodiversity movements and claims autistic people with less intensive support needs are overrepresented in media and policymaking. The NCSA also dismisses expanded diagnostic criteria and access as the sole reason for the longterm rise in autism prevalence its leadership has labeled "epidemic."

=== Autism Every Day controversy ===
In 2006, Autism Speaks sponsored and distributed the short film Autism Every Day, produced by Lauren Thierry and Eric Solomon. Singer was criticized for a scene in which she recalled contemplating murder-suicide by driving her and her autistic daughter off the George Washington Bridge following a visit to a specialized school she deemed terrible. She was additionally criticized for recounting this in the presence of her autistic daughter. Thierry said that these feelings were not unusual among non-autistic mothers of autistic children. According to the book Battleground: The Media, Thierry instructed the families she interviewed not to do their hair, vacuum or have therapists present and appeared with her film crew without preliminary preparations, in order to authentically capture the difficulties of life with autistic children, such as autistic children having meltdowns or physically struggling with parents.

In 2009, Singer responded by claiming that she made this comment because the New York State Department of Health recommended that her autistic daughter be placed in a school with very poor conditions and did not want her daughter to suffer there. However, she regretted phrasing her concerns in that manner.
