= Total care =

Form of long-term care

Total care is where long-term care facilities for residents are responsible for meeting all the needs of a resident. While some residents receiving so-called total care may be able to independently meet all or some of their needs for their activities of daily living without the assistance of a caregiver, the facility and its staff have the duty of monitoring the resident to be sure s/he is having those needs met.

The term "total care" is also used within long-term care facilities to refer to residents who need actual assistance in meeting all their needs in their activities of daily living. Those who need little or no assistance are referred to as "self care."

Some facilities have special units reserved for those dependent on total care. Others specialize specifically in residents in need of total care. Some facilities cannot handle total care residents, and when one becomes needy of such care, the facility will transfer the resident to another facility.

It is not uncommon for a resident to enter a facility able to meet one's needs independently, but later to come in need of total care.

Many facilities will house total care residents in the less desirable parts of the buildings, such as basements, upper floors or rear wings, and place the self care residents in better health near the entrance for a better impression. This is considered to be controversial for the stigma it brings to such residents, though it does not necessarily mean substandard care.

== Losses of a total care patient ==
Residents of long-term care facilities who are receiving total care will typically suffer in the following ways:

- Less accommodation for personal needs
- Longer waits for care to meet one's needs for basic comfort
- Loss of freedom to make one's own choices
- Loss of freedom when to be awake or asleep
- Loss of privacy, as caregivers will need to view patient's private parts

== Hazards faced by total care patients ==
Besides the inevitable possibility of death caused by the conditions of a total care resident, their lives are also at risk due to the dangers caused by their care.

Neglect is common among total care residents. Many residents who are immobile must have their weight carried by caregivers, who often are overworked and/or understaffed and as a result, are forced to try to cut corners and do it minimally or avoid it altogether.

Many total care residents are left in one position for a long time, which can lead to the breakdown of their skin, bed sores, and insufficient circulation.

Feeding becomes an issue with total care patients. Some recipients of total care have difficulty swallowing, thereby posing a choking hazard.

== See also ==
- Palliative care
- Hospice care
