= Simons Foundation Autism Research Initiative =

Research program

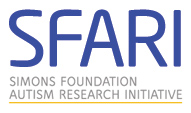
- Founded: 2003; 23 years ago
- Founders: James Simons, Marilyn Simons
- Legal status: Private organization
- Headquarters: New York City
- Services: Research
- Website: www.sfari.org

The Simons Foundation Autism Research Initiative, or SFARI for short, is an American research program based in New York City. It was established in 2005 by the Simons Foundation, which focuses on all aspects of autism research.

== Awards ==
The awards they give out include Bridge to Independence Awards (for early-careers researchers transitioning to independent positions), Pilot Awards (for innovative high-impact proposals for experiments still in the preliminary stages), Research Awards (for research into a topic which has already been investigated at least preliminarily), and Explorer Awards (which provides grants for focused experiments on a one-time basis). One specific type of research they specialize in is mouse models of autism, which they are trying to make more available in cooperation with the Jackson Laboratory.

== Specific programs ==
=== SFARI Gene ===
SFARI Gene is an integrative model with a publicly available web portal for the ongoing collection, curation and visualization of genes linked to autism disorders. The content originates entirely from the published scientific literature. SFARI Gene also provides a comprehensive collection of animal models linked to autism. The Simons Simplex Collection is a sample gathered by SFARI from over 2000 families for identifying de novo genetic variants that contribute to the overall risk of autism.

=== SPARK ===
In 2016, SFARI launched Simons Foundation Powering Autism Research (SPARK), an online research initiative designed to become the largest autism study ever undertaken in the United States. For researchers, SPARK provides a large, well-characterized cohort of genetic, medical and behavioral data, and will result in cost-savings for researchers by reducing start-up costs for individual studies.

=== Spectrum ===
In 2008, SFARI launched Spectrum, an Autism research news website, as the "News & Opinion" section of the SFARI website. In the summer of 2015, Spectrum was spun off of SFARI as an independent online news entity.

== See also ==
- National Database for Autism Research
