= Jill Escher =

American attorney

- Born: 1965 (age 60–61); Los Angeles, California, U.S.
- Education: Stanford University (BA); University of California, Berkeley (JD)
- Occupations: Lawyer; Investor
- Known for: National Council on Severe Autism; The Escher Fund for Autism
- Website: www.jillescher.com

Jill Escher (born 1965) is a former attorney and real estate developer. She is the head of the Escher Fund for Autism, the immediate past president of the Autism Society of America San Francisco Bay Area chapter, and the president of the National Council on Severe Autism.

== Research ==
Escher hypothesizes that the increasing prevalence and strong heritability of autism can in part be explained by non-genetic, environmentally informed events. The changes can manifest as changes in chromatin, epigenome, or de novo mutations. She is known for collaborating with scientific experts and for speaking at scientific conferences. Escher has also petitioned the FDA to withdraw approval for two drugs until they can be tested for impacts on developing fetal germ cells.

== Advocacy ==
Before becoming a research advocate, Escher earned her J.D. degree and Master's in City and Regional Planning at UC Berkeley. In 1996, Jill Escher published her master's thesis, A Nightmare on Elm Street?: Government Liability for Innovative Street Design.

In 2002, Escher appealed to the Blue Cross Blue Shield Federal Employee Program to provide reimbursement for speech–language services for all autistic individuals, claiming that speech therapy provides benefits to autistic individuals that are equivalent to medicine. Escher won her appeal and also asked the OPM for a written decision indicating that BCBS was in error.

In April 2025, Escher wrote an op-ed for Tablet responding to controversial statements about the autistic community made by prominent anti-vaccine activist and recently appointed U.S. Secretary of Health and Human Services Robert F. Kennedy Jr. In the article, Escher claimed that Kennedy's use of the word "epidemic" was scientifically accurate and he was right to reject changes to diagnostic criteria as the primary cause of continuously rising autism prevalence estimates. Escher also dismissed characterizations of Kennedy's remarks as "eugenic" and stated, "We need unwavering national leadership, whether it be Kennedy or others, to unleash efforts to finally find answers." Escher acknowledged that Kennedy was wrong to characterize vaccines and environmental toxins as causative agents and criticized his hiring of discredited anti-vaccine activist David Geier, stating, "That Kennedy hired David Geier, a disgraced clinician, to help lead autism research at the National Institutes of Health should send chills down our collective spines. It shows that despite having some wisdom about autism's increase, he still clings to conspiracy theories, and their peddlers."

== Bibliography ==
- Farewell, Club Perma-Chub: a sugar addict's guide to easy weight loss. Claradon Press. 2011. ISBN 978-1-4662-7389-4. OCLC 781503008.
