= Interagency Autism Coordinating Committee =

United States federal advisory panel

Committee overview
- Formed: October 17, 2000; 25 years ago
- Jurisdiction: Federal Government of the United States
- Parent department: United States Department of Health and Human Services
- Website: iacc.hhs.gov

The Interagency Autism Coordinating Committee (IACC) is a United States federal advisory panel within the Department of Health and Human Services (HHS). It coordinates all efforts within HHS concerning autism spectrum disorder (ASD).

== Mission ==
The stated mission of the Interagency Autism Coordinating Committee includes providing “advice and recommendations to the Secretary of Health and Human Services regarding Federal activities related to autism spectrum disorder.” Additionally, it coordinates “ASD activities among the member agencies and organizations.” with the intention to ensuring that efforts are not duplicative and that they benefit from cross-collaborative opportunities. The IACC offers a “public forum for discussions related to ASD research, services, and policy” which is held quarterly.

An annual update summarizing significant advances in autism research was published online every year from 2007 until 2022. The IACC Strategic Plan for Autism Research, Services, and Policy is released periodically, with the most recent released in September 2023 covering the years 2021-2023. IACC activities and associated cross-agency programs, policies and research are coordinated and managed by the Office of Autism Research Coordination (OARC).

== History ==
Originally, the Interagency Autism Coordinating Committee was established in 2000 under the Children's Health Act. Its creation was brought about by "the efforts of the broad autism community’s work with Congress." The Combating Autism Act of 2006 reauthorized the committee and chartered it as a federal advisory committee. Additional reauthorizations occurred in 2011, 2014, and 2019. The Autism CARES Act of 2024 authorizes the IACC to continue its work until September 30, 2029.

== Criticisms and controversies ==
=== GAO recommendations ===
A November 2013 study of federal autism activities by the U.S. General Accounting Office (GAO) found that better data and more coordination was needed. GAO found that 84% of "autism research projects funded by federal agencies from fiscal years 2008 through 2012" may have been duplicative and that "IACC members provided mixed views on the usefulness of the IACC's meetings, strategic plan, and portfolio analysis in aiding coordination and monitoring."

In 2017, GAO noted that the Interagency Autism Coordinating Committee has not collaborated with agencies outside the Department of Health and Human Services to support research for transition-age youth with ASD. They suggested that, "as a result, IACC may continue to miss opportunities to leverage the knowledge of other agencies."

The GAO study on autism research and support services, published in February 2024, found that "although IACC strategic plans describe high-level progress made toward autism activities, they generally have not described how progress made relates to goals." GAO noted that despite HHS claims that "descriptions of how performance is lagging are provided in the IACC strategic plan," their study did not find those details "presented clearly for each IACC goal."

=== Bias toward neurodiversity ===
Jonathan Mitchell, an autistic advocate, has criticized the IACC's nomination process by claiming that it is too biased towards accepting neurodiversity. He points out that, as of the writing of his article in 2019, "seven pro-neurodiversity, anti-cure autistics were appointed." At that point in time, nominations to fill the two IACC seats reserved for two autistic individuals had included two people who take an anti-neurodiversity and pro-cure stance, however, they were not selected to serve.

=== January 2026 appointments ===
For over two decades, the work of the IACC was "sustained...by the dedicated service of leading scientists, advocates, and public servants." The U.S. Department of Health and Human Services appointed 21 new members to the IACC on January 28th, 2026. According to the IACC website, the new members “reflect the commitment of HHS Secretary Robert F. Kennedy, Jr. to support breakthrough innovations in autism research, diagnosis, treatment, and prevention by bringing the nation’s understanding of and policies concerning autism into alignment with gold-standard science.”

Autism Science Foundation (ASF) President Alison Singer, who previously served three terms as an IACC Public member, strongly disagreed with that official statement. She is concerned that, “the newly constituted IACC represents a complete and unprecedented overhaul, with no continuity from prior committees and a striking absence of scientific expertise” and that “members have been cherry-picked to reach a predetermined conclusion, not to seek broad, good-faith input from qualified experts and stakeholders.” ASF is concerned that this new committee no longer reflects the diversity of “a wide range of viewpoints and expertise, enabling meaningful discussion of scientific advances and policy priorities.” In particular, they point out that many of the new members reflect “a very small subset of families who believe vaccines cause autism, while excluding the overwhelming majority of autistic individuals, families, and advocates who support evidence-based science.”

==== Vaccine opponents and biomedical cure proponents ====
Several of the new appointees to the IACC “have been involved with movements that claim there is a biomedical ‘cure’ for autism”, a position which "is opposed by most autism self-advocacy groups.” One new member, Tracy Slepcevic, claims in her book, Warrior Mom: A Mother’s Journey in Healing Her Son With Autism that her son's autism was caused by a vaccine and that she cured him with dietary changes and supplements. Another appointee, Honey Rinicella, "is the executive director of the Medical Academy of Pediatrics and Special Needs (MedMAPS)." Several members of that organization have been involved in promoting chelation therapy to cure autism.

==== Facilitated communication ====
Facilitated communication or Spelling 2 Communicate (S2P) is an additional pseudoscientific idea promoted by a few of the new IACC appointees. Two of the new members, Elizabeth Bonkers and Caden Larson, "are adults with autism who use—or more accurately are subjected to—Spelling [2] Communicate." A third member, Krystal Higgins, is the executive director of the National Autism Association which advocates facilitated communication and promotes possible links between autism and vaccines.

==== Alternative advisory panel ====
In light of the discredited approaches promoted by the 2026 IACC appointees, the Independent Autism Coordinating Committee was initiated on March 3, 2026. Its 12 members are experienced scientists and autism advocates, including Autism Science Foundation president Alison Singer, neuroscientist and former director of the National Institute of Mental Health Joshua Gordon, psychology researcher Helen Tager-Flusberg, and parent-advocate and historian of medicine Amy S.F. Lutz.

== Membership ==
The Committee includes both federal officials and public stakeholder members. Federal officials are selected from the government agencies that work on autism related issues. Public members include "autistic adults, parents and family members, advocates, community providers, and researchers."

=== Member agencies ===
IACC member agencies within HHS are:

- Administration for Children and Families (ACF)
- Administration for Community Living (ACL)
- Agency for Healthcare Resources and Quality (AHRQ)
- Centers for Medicare and Medicaid Services (CMS)
- Centers for Disease Control and Prevention (CDC)
- Food and Drug Administration (FDA)
- Health Resources and Services Administration (HRSA)
- Indian Health Service (IHS)
- National Institutes of Health (NIH)
- Substance Abuse and Mental Health Services Administration (SAMHSA)

Additional IACC member agencies external to HHS include:

- U.S. Department of Defense (DoD)
- U.S. Department of Education (ED)
- U.S. Department of Housing and Urban Development (HUD)
- U.S. Department of Justice (DOJ)
- U.S. Department of Labor (DOL)
- U.S. Department of Veterans Affairs (VA)
- U.S. Environmental Protection Agency (EPA)
- U.S. Social Security Administration (SSA)
