= National Alliance for Autism Research =

Non-profit organization (1994–2006)

The National Alliance for Autism Research (NAAR), based in Princeton, New Jersey, was a non-profit advocacy organization founded in 1994 by parents of autistic children concerned about the limited funding available for research. It was absorbed by autism-focused nonprofit Autism Speaks in 2006.

== Origins and activities ==
NAAR was founded in 1994 as an attempt to stimulate biomedical research and science-based approaches to understanding, treating, and curing autism spectrum disorders. The founders comprised a small group of parents, including two psychiatrists, a lawyer, a CPA and a chemistry professor.

NAAR raised money to provide research grants focusing on autism, and, as of 2006, had committed nearly $30 million to over 270 autism research projects, fellowships and collaborative programs—more than any other non-governmental organization at the time. NAAR focused intently on its role in establishing and funding the Autism Tissue Program, a post-mortem brain tissue donation program designed to further autism research studies at the cellular and molecular level. Other major programs included the High Risk Baby Sibling Autism Research Project and the NAAR Genome Project. NAAR also published the NAARRATIVE, a newsletter on autism biomedical research.

In early 2006, NAAR merged with autism-focused nonprofit Autism Speaks. The absorption of NAAR by Autism Speaks caused severe conflict between incoming NAAR leadership (which primarily advocated for research into genetic causes of autism) and the rest of the organization's leadership (which primarily advocated for research into environmental causes, including research into the debunked theory that vaccines caused autism). This conflict prompted some former NAAR leaders to resign from their roles at Autism Speaks. In December 2019, an anonymous source close to early Autism Speaks leadership told Business Insider, "They created Autism Speaks by merging it with an organization that refuses to say autism is anything but genetic. ... It was putting the Palestinians and the Israelis in the same organization."

== See also ==
- Interactive Autism Network
