= Flatiron Institute =

American research institute

The Flatiron Institute is an American internal research division of the Simons Foundation, launched in 2016. The mission of the Flatiron Institute is to advance scientific research through computational methods, including data analysis, theory, modeling, and simulation. The Flatiron Institute was dedicated with a ceremony on September 6, 2017, and takes its name from the Flatiron District in New York City, where it is based.

The Flatiron Institute comprises five centers for computational science: the Center for Computational Astrophysics (CCA); the Center for Computational Biology (CCB); the Center for Computational Quantum Physics (CCQ); the Center for Computational Mathematics (CCM); and the Center for Computational Neuroscience (CCN). It also has a Scientific Computing Core (SCC) that manages the institute's computational resources and provides software development expertise. In addition to the permanent computational centers, the institute has also started the Initiative for Computational Catalysis (ICC), a 10-year effort to develop computational techniques enabling the rational design of catalysts.

== Center for Computational Biology ==
- Launched in 2013 as the Simons Center for Data Analysis
- Director: Michael Shelley
- Mission: CCB's mission is to develop modeling tools and theory for understanding biological processes and to create computational frameworks that will enable the analysis of the large, complex data sets being generated by new experimental technologies.
- Current research areas: Biophysical Modeling, Developmental Dynamics, Genomics, Structural and Molecular Biophysics, Biomolecular Design, and Biological Transport Networks
- Past research areas: Systems Biology

== Center for Computational Astrophysics ==
- Launched in 2016
- Director: Julianne Dalcanton
- Mission: CCA's mission is to create new computational frameworks that allow scientists to analyze big astronomical datasets and to understand complex, multi-scale physics in a cosmological context.
- Research areas: Astronomical Data, Compact Objects, Cosmology X Data Science, Dynamics, Galaxy Formation, Gravitational-Wave Astronomy, Planet Formation

== Center for Computational Quantum Physics ==
- Launched in 2017
- Director: Antoine Georges; co-director: Andrew Millis
- Mission: CCQ's mission is to develop the concepts, theories, algorithms and codes needed to solve the quantum many-body problem and use the solutions to predict the behavior of materials and molecules of scientific and technological interest.

== Center for Computational Mathematics ==
- Launched in 2018
- Director: Leslie Greengard
- Mission: CCM’s mission is to create new mathematical approaches, algorithms and software to advance scientific research in multiple disciplines, often in collaboration with other Flatiron Centers.
- Research areas: Image and Signal Processing, Machine learning and Data Analysis, Numerical Analysis

== Center for Computational Neuroscience ==
- Launched in 2021
- Director: Eero Simoncelli
- Mission: CCN’s mission is to develop models, principles and conceptual frameworks that deepen our knowledge of brain function—both in health and in disease.
- Research areas: Computational Vision, Neural Circuits and Algorithms, NeuroAI and Geometric Data Analysis, Statistical Analysis for Neural Data

== Scientific Computing Core ==
- Co-directors: Nick Carriero and Ian Fisk
- Mission: SCC's mission is to develop and deploy the computing infrastructure—including new computational and statistical methods and storage and data handling system support—necessary for carrying out the research missions of CCA, CCB, CCM, CCN and CCQ.

== Initiative for Computational Catalysis ==
- Launched in 2024
- Co-directors: Angel Rubio and Timothy Berkelbach
