= Simons Foundation =

American private foundation

- Formation: 1994; 32 years ago
- Type: Private foundation
- Headquarters: New York City, U.S.
- President: David Spergel
- Key people: Marlow Kee; Marion Greenup; Euan Robertson
- Revenue: $267,780,782 (2021)
- Expenses: $307,447,716 (2021)
- Website: www.simonsfoundation.org

The Simons Foundation is an American private foundation established in 1994 by Marilyn and Jim Simons with offices in New York City. As one of the largest charitable organizations in the United States with assets of over $5 billion in 2022, the foundation's mission is to advance the frontiers of research in mathematics and basic sciences.

The foundation supports science by making grants to individual researchers and their projects.

In 2021, Marilyn Simons stepped down as president after 26 years at the helm, and astrophysicist David Spergel was appointed president.

== The Flatiron Institute ==
In 2016, the foundation launched the Flatiron Institute, its in-house multidisciplinary research institute focused on computational science. The Flatiron Institute hosts centers for computational science in five areas:

- Center for Computational Astrophysics (CCA)
- Center for Computational Biology (CCB)
- Center for Computational Quantum Physics (CCQ)
- Center for Computational Mathematics (CCM)
- Center for Computational Neuroscience (CCN)

== Funding areas ==
The foundation makes grants in four program areas:

- Mathematics and Physical Sciences (MPS)
- Life Sciences
- Autism Research / Simons Foundation Autism Research Initiative (SFARI)
- Outreach, Education, and Engagement

== Simons Investigators awardees ==
Among other programs, the Simons Foundation funds the Simons Investigators in MPS program which provides a stable base of support for outstanding scientists, enabling them to undertake long-term study of fundamental questions.

== Simons Collaborations ==
In 2012 the foundation launched a new funding model, the Simons Collaborations, which brings funded investigators — sometimes from different disciplines — together to work on an important scientific problem. To date, 25 Simons Collaborations have been launched by the foundation's Mathematics and Physical Sciences and Life Sciences divisions and by its neuroscience initiatives.

== White House BRAIN Initiative Alliance membership ==
As of December 2018, the Simons Foundation is listed as a White House BRAIN Initiative Alliance Member. The Simons Collaboration on the Global Brain (SCGB) is working to understand the internal processes underlying cognition.

== Major gifts ==
In May 2022, the Simons Foundation partnered with Stony Brook University to boost diversity in STEM, with a $56 million gift.

In April 2023, the Simons Foundation pledged $100 million to support “The New York Climate Exchange” (“The Exchange”) on Governors Island in New York City. The Exchange — a $700 million, 172-acre international center for developing and deploying dynamic solutions to the global climate crisis — is set to open in 2028.

In June 2023, the Simons Foundation presented Stony Brook University with a $500 million unrestricted gift, which is one of the largest gifts ever made to a U.S. university.

The Simons Foundation is a major supporter of Math for America, which has built a community of accomplished mathematics and science teachers who make a lasting impact in their schools, their communities, and the profession at large through collaboration and continued learning.

== Supported institutes ==
- Simons Center for Geometry and Physics (Stony Brook University)
- Simons Center for Quantitative Biology (Cold Spring Harbor Laboratory)
- Simons Institute for the Theory of Computing (University of California, Berkeley)
- Simons Laufer Mathematical Sciences Institute (University of California, Berkeley)
- Simons Center for the Social Brain (Massachusetts Institute of Technology)
- National Institute for Theory and Mathematics in Biology (Northwestern University and The University of Chicago)

== Philanthro-journalism ==
The foundation also funds two editorially independent online publications: Quanta Magazine and The Transmitter.

Quanta reports on developments in mathematics, theoretical physics, theoretical computer science, and the basic life sciences.

The Transmitter provides news and analysis of advances in neuroscience research and is the successor to Spectrum, a publication focused on autism research which originated as the News & Opinion section of the Simons Foundation Autism Research Initiative website.

The Simons Foundation also operates the film production company Sandbox Films.
