= Autism Speaks =

American advocacy organization

- Founded: February 11, 2005; 21 years ago
- Founders: Bob Wright; Suzanne Wright
- Merger of: Autism Coalition for Research and Education; National Alliance for Autism Research; Cure Autism Now
- Tax ID no.: 20-2329938
- Legal status: 501(c)(3) nonprofit organization
- Headquarters: New York City
- Coordinates: 40.7477°N 73.9843°W
- Services: Awareness, family services, advocacy
- President and CEO: Keith Wargo
- COO: Joe Vanyo
- Subsidiaries: Delivering Scientific Innovation for Autism LLC, Advancing Futures for Adults with Autism Inc, Autism Speaks Canada
- Website: autismspeaks.org

Autism Speaks Inc. is an American non-profit autism awareness organization and the largest autism research organization in the United States. It sponsors autism research and conducts awareness and outreach activities aimed at families, governments, and the public. It was founded in February 2005 by Bob Wright and his wife Suzanne, a year after their grandson Christian was diagnosed with autism. The same year as its founding, the organization merged with Autism Coalition for Research and Education. It then merged with the National Alliance for Autism Research (NAAR) in 2006 and Cure Autism Now (CAN) in 2007.

Some members of the autistic rights and neurodiversity movements do not see autism as a disease that needs to be cured, and have criticized Autism Speaks for seeking a cure. The word "cure" was dropped from its mission statement in 2016. Autism Speaks has also been criticized by some activists, advocates, and researchers for perpetuating stigma against autistic people, promoting pseudoscience, excluding autistic people from decision-making, and continuing to fund genetic research (which some critics assign a low priority to and others fear may lead to the development of a cure or prenatal test). Autism Speaks previously funded research examining an alleged link between vaccines and autism; the organization formally accepted the scientific consensus that no such link exists in 2015.

== History ==
Autism Speaks was founded in February 2005 by Bob Wright, vice chairman of General Electric, and his wife Suzanne, a year after their grandson Christian was diagnosed with autism. The organization was established with a $25 million donation from The Home Depot founder Bernie Marcus, who sat on its board of directors for some years. Since its founding, Autism Speaks has merged with three existing autism organizations.

Autism Speaks has combined organizations that funded peer-reviewed research into genetic causes, promoted alternative theories and therapies, and advocated for people with autism. In 2005, Autism Speaks merged with the Autism Coalition for Research and Education. In early 2006, a year after its founding, Autism Speaks merged with NAAR. NAAR, founded in 1994, was the first U.S. nonprofit organization dedicated to supporting research into causes, treatment, and cures for autism spectrum disorders. The founders were a small group of parents, including two psychiatrists, a lawyer and a chemistry professor. In 2007, Autism Speaks completed its merger with Cure Autism Now (CAN). CAN was founded in 1995 by Jonathan Shestack and Portia Iversen.

In January 2008, child clinical psychologist Geraldine Dawson became Autism Speaks' chief science officer. In April 2010, the organization named Yoko Ono its first "Global Autism Ambassador." In 2009, Autism Speaks used the "Wubbzy" character from Wow! Wow! Wubbzy! to promote World Autism Awareness Day. In 2019, Autism Speaks featured the autistic character Julia from Sesame Street in public service announcements (PSAs) promoting early autism screening. The use of Julia in the PSAs prompted the Autistic Self Advocacy Network (ASAN), an autistic-led nonprofit organization, to end its years-long collaboration with the show's production company. ASAN objected to the PSAs promoting Autism Speaks' guide for families of newly diagnosed children (the "100 Day Kit"), which it criticized for lacking information about communication supports, using stigmatizing language, and promoting compliance-based therapies and pseudoscientific diets.

In May 2015, Bob Wright resigned as chairman of the organization and was succeeded by Brian Kelly. Co-founder Suzanne Wright took a leave of absence in November 2015, following a diagnosis of pancreatic cancer. She died in July 2016.

Mark Roithmayr led Autism Speaks from 2005 to 2012. In June 2012, he was succeeded by Liz Feld who had joined the organization the same year as executive vice president of strategic communications before she was promoted to become the president. Feld was succeeded by Angela Timashenka Geiger who served in the position beginning in February 2016. In October 2021, Autism Speaks appointed Keith Wargo as its new president and CEO.

In 2024, Autism Speaks Canada, the Canadian arm of the organization, announced that it would be shutting down effective January 31, 2025. The organization said that the United States branch would continue operation.

== Activities ==
Autism Speaks, along with its predecessor organizations, has been a source of funding for research into the causes and treatment of autism spectrum disorder; it also conducts awareness and outreach activities aimed at families, governments and the public.

=== Research ===
Autism Speaks and its predecessor organizations have raised public awareness for autism research, raised funds directly for research, and lobbied Congress to leverage the privately raised money with much greater public funds. From 1997 to 2006, their advocacy in the areas of treatment and environmental factors shifted research priorities in the U.S. from basic research to translational and clinical research, with less emphasis on the underlying biology and greater emphasis on putting what was known to practical use.

As of 2008, Autism Speaks supported research in four main areas:

- Etiology includes genetic and environmental factors that may cause autism. This research includes searches for autism susceptibility genes, animal models for autism, environmental toxins, and maternal viral infections.
- Biology studies cells, the brain, and the body. This focuses on brain development and includes the Autism Tissue Program discussed further below.
- Diagnosis includes epidemiology, early diagnosis, and biomarkers.
- Autism therapies include medication, behavioral, and psychological interventions. It includes treatments for co-occurring medical conditions in children which are unrelated to autism, such as sleep disorders and gastrointestinal conditions that may hinder behavioral interventions, along with treatments for older individuals, and complementary and alternative medicine.

Autism Speaks and the National Institute of Mental Health fund the Autism Genetic Resource Exchange (AGRE), a nonprofit DNA repository and family registry of genotypic and phenotypic information that is available to autism researchers worldwide. AGRE was established in the late 1990s by researchers and the National Institutes of Health in collaboration with CAN.

Autism Speaks previously funded the Autism Tissue Program, a network of researchers that managed and distributed brain tissues collected post-mortem from autistic people and their family members. Such donations are rare and a vital component of research into the causes of autism. In 2014, all functions of the Autism Tissue Program were rolled over into Autism BrainNet, which is jointly funded by Autism Speaks and the Simons Foundation.

Autism Speaks supports the Clinical Trials Network, which focuses on new pharmacological treatments. It also supports the Toddler Treatment Network, which develops new interventions for infants and toddlers.

Since June 2014, Autism Speaks has partnered with Google on a project called Mssng (pronounced "missing"). Previously known as The Autism Speaks Ten Thousand Genomes Program (AUT10K), it is an open source research platform for autism that aims to collect and study the DNA of 10,000 families that have been affected by autism. The goal is to create the world's largest database of sequenced genomic information of autism run on Google's cloud-based genome database, Google Genomics. In December 2014, the pair announced they would allow worldwide access to the research for further collaboration and genome analysis. Autism Speaks' other partners on the project include The Hospital for Sick Children and DNAStack. Mssng has been criticized by some autistic individuals and advocates for using a title that implies autistic people are incomplete, excluding the autistic community from the decision-making process, and spending money on research unlikely to have any impact on the lives of autistic people in the near future. Some autistic individuals and advocates have also labeled the project eugenic and claimed its primary goal is to develop a cure or prenatal test for autism. In 2021, Tom Frazier (then Autism Speaks' chief science officer) disputed those characterizations and stated, "The project really is about actually trying to understand the biology of people with autism so that we can identify the kinds of interventions and supports that they might need."

=== Awareness, media and events ===
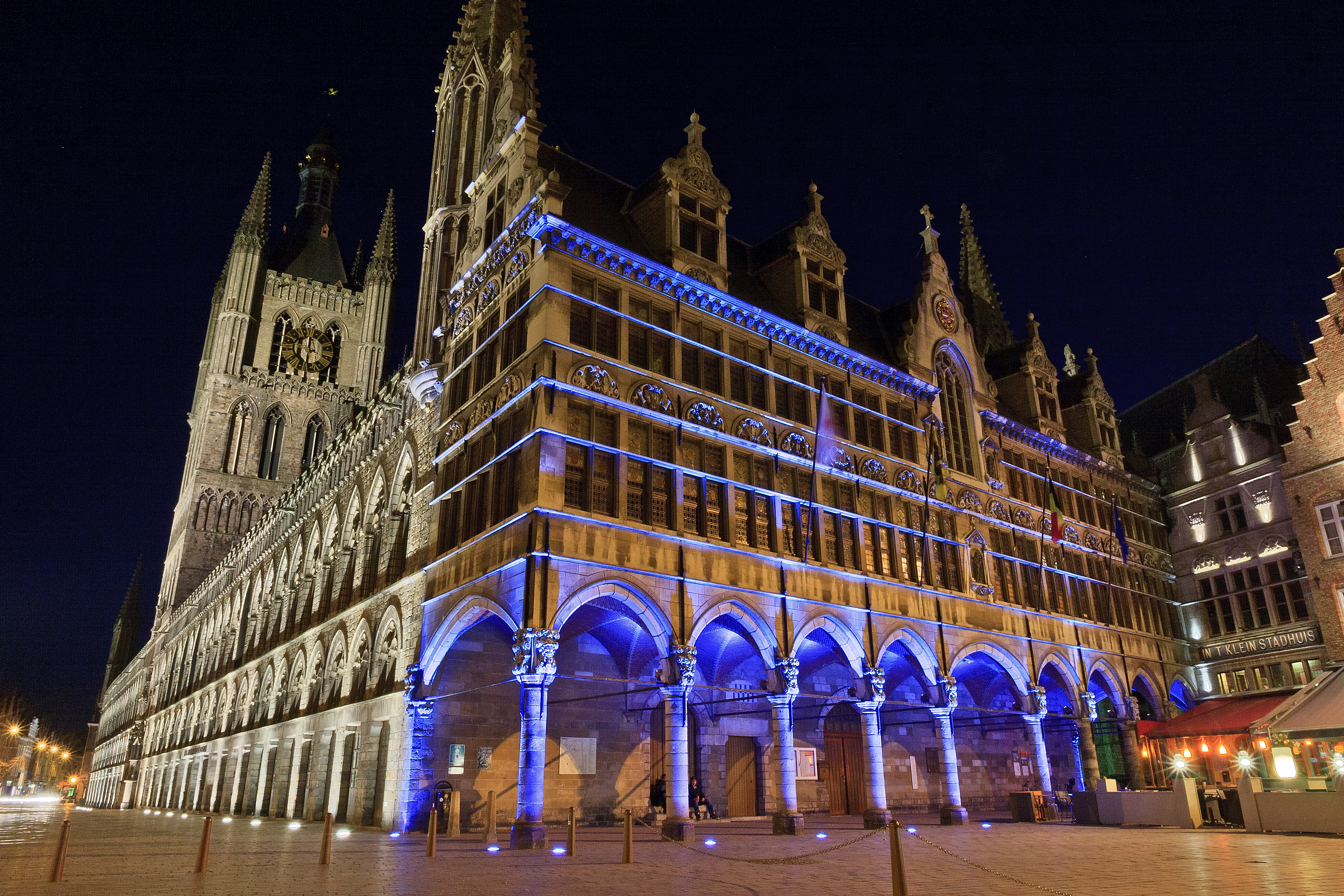
On April 2, 2013, the Cloth Hall, Ypres, Belgium with Nieuwerck was lit up blue for the World Autism Awareness Day.

Autism Speaks sponsored and distributed the 2006 short documentary film Autism Every Day, produced by Lauren Thierry and Eric Solomon. Autism Speaks staff member Alison Singer was criticized for a scene in which she said, in the presence of her autistic daughter, that when faced with having to place the girl in a school for autistic children, she contemplated putting her child in her car and driving off a bridge. Thierry said that these feelings were not unusual among non-autistic mothers of autistic children. According to the 2008 book Battleground: The Media by Robin Andersen, Thierry instructed the families she interviewed not to do their hair, vacuum, or have therapists present, and appeared with her film crew at homes without preliminary preparations, in order to "authentically" capture the difficulties of life with autistic children, such as autistic children having meltdowns or physically struggling with parents.

In December 2007, Autism Speaks' founder Suzanne Wright met with Sheikha Moza bint Nasser of Qatar to urge the country to sponsor a United Nations resolution recognizing World Autism Awareness Day. Qatar introduced the resolution, which was passed and adopted without a vote by the United Nations General Assembly, primarily as a supplement to previous United Nations initiatives to improve human rights.

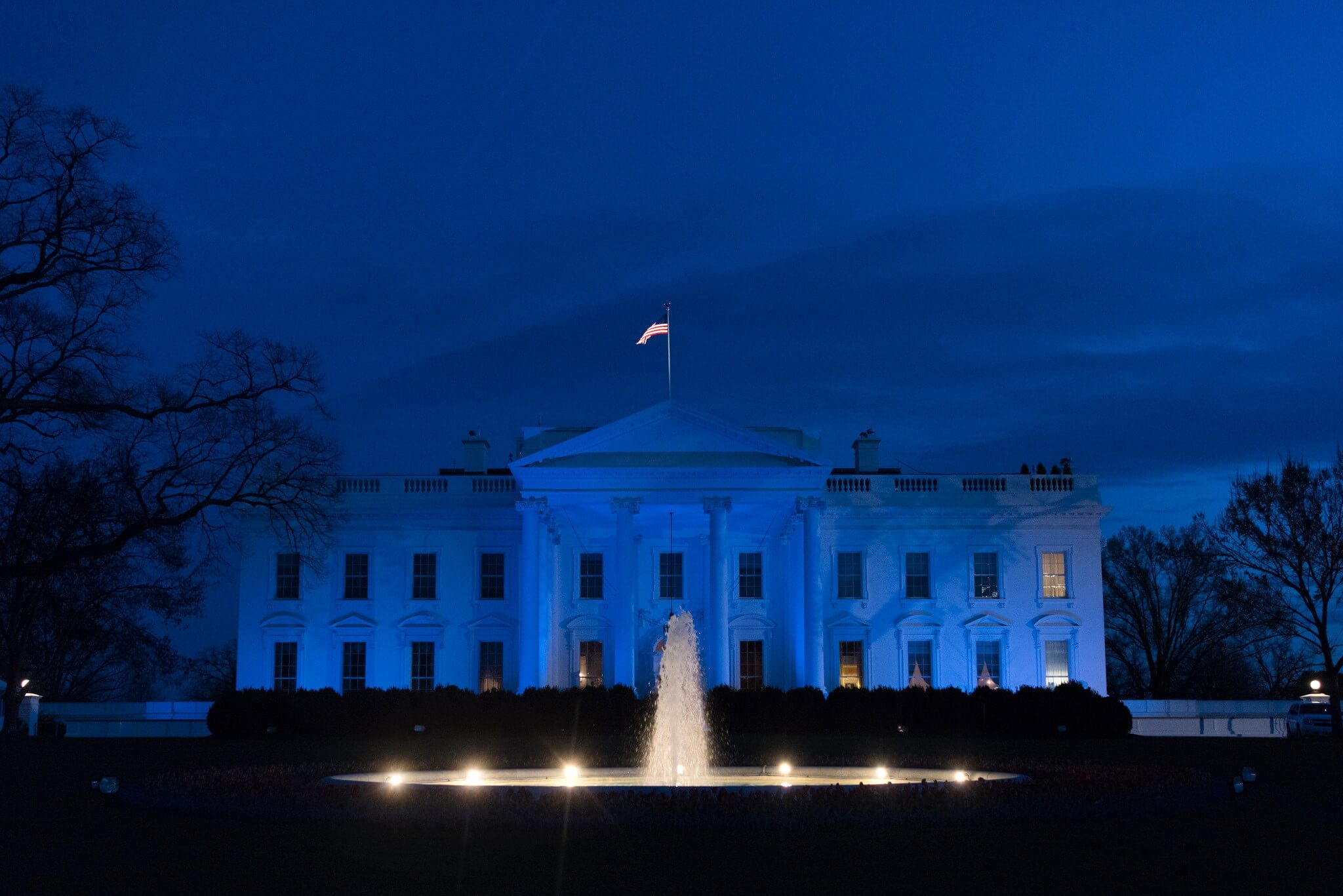
The White House lit in blue in honor of World Autism Awareness Day, 2017

Wright helped launch the Autism Speaks' Light It Up Blue campaign and the annual World Focus on Autism event. Light It Up Blue is a campaign to raise awareness of autism in support of both World Autism Awareness Day, observed on April 2, and the beginning of Autism Awareness Month in the United States. As part of the campaign, statues and buildings – including the Empire State Building in New York City and Willis Tower in Chicago along with the CN Tower in Toronto – are among more than 100 structures in at least 16 U.S. cities and nine countries around the world lit up in blue on the evening of April 1, 2010. Autism Speaks volunteers and supporters began the day at the New York Stock Exchange by ringing the opening bell in what has become a yearly tradition since 2008. In 2011, despite efforts by Autism Speaks, the White House said it would not light up blue to mark World Autism Awareness Day. In 2017, President Donald Trump fulfilled a promise to Suzanne Wright (co-founder of Autism Speaks) by lighting the White House in blue.

In November 2013, Autism Speaks published an op-ed by co-founder Suzanne Wright titled "Autism Speaks to Washington - A Call for Action". Some autistic people and their family members criticized the piece for using stigmatizing and pathologizing language, providing inaccurate statistics, and giving an unrepresentative and exaggerated depiction of the lives of autistic people and their families. John Elder Robison, a self-advocate who served on the science and treatment advisory boards of the organization, resigned following the op-ed. At the time of his resignation, Robison stated the following:

Autism Speaks says it's the advocacy group for people with autism and their families. It's not, despite having had many chances to become that voice. Autism Speaks is the only major medical or mental health nonprofit whose legitimacy is constantly challenged by a large percentage of the people affected by the condition they target.

== Controversies ==
=== View of autism as a disease ===
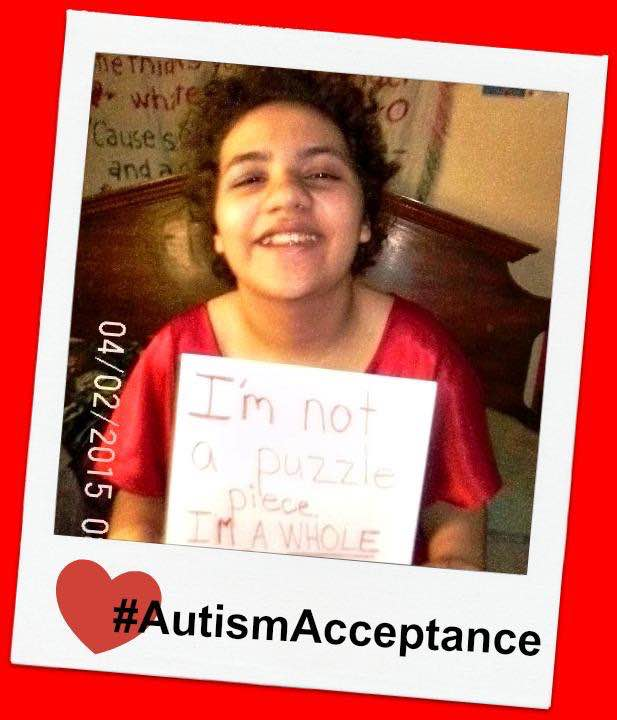
The #REDInstead movement is a response to Autism Speaks' Light It Up Blue campaign by neurodiversity advocates critical of the organization.

Autism Speaks's past advocacy has been based on the view of autism as a disease: "This disease has taken our children away. It's time to get them back." According to Nature in 2008, this is a view that "many but not all autism scientists would endorse". In contrast, autistic activists have promoted the idea of neurodiversity and the social model of disability, asserting that autistic people are "different but not diseased", and they challenge "how we conceptualize such medical conditions".

In September 2009, Autism Speaks screened the short film I Am Autism at its annual World Focus on Autism event. The piece — created by filmmaker Alfonso Cuarón and Autism Speaks board member Billy Mann — was criticized by autistic individuals, advocates and researchers for its inaccurate and stigmatizing portrayal of autism. It included a voiceover segment in which an anthropomorphized version of autism compared itself to various diseases (specifically AIDS, cancer and diabetes) and claimed to ruin marriages, bankrupt families and rob autistic people of their voices. Ari Ne'eman (then the president of ASAN) called I Am Autism "embarrassing, offensive and inaccurate" and said it amplified the "fear and prejudice and stigma" faced by autistic people. Ne'eman also pointed out that it was not true that parents of autistic children divorced at a substantially higher rate than the parents of non-disabled children and accused Autism Speaks of using "fear and pity-mongering" to fundraise. Autism researcher Morton Gernsbacher criticized Autism Speaks for not taking into account the "deleterious effects of fear-eliciting messaging" and suggested the piece could have a destructive effect. Marc Sirkin (then Autism Speaks' chief community officer) initially defended the organization's decision to promote the film, claiming it was shown to raise awareness, rather than to fundraise. Sirkin also claimed I Am Autism did not receive an exclusively negative reception and that it was important for Autism Speaks to platform a diversity of perspectives. In response to the criticism the film received, the organization removed a link to the film from its website.

In response to an editorial by Steve Silberman in the Los Angeles Times criticizing Autism Speaks, then-president Liz Feld stated that one-third of autistic people also have a seizure disorder, half have serious digestive complications, 50 percent wander, and more than 30 percent are nonverbal. Feld also discussed Autism Speaks' legal achievements in providing families of those who are autistic more financial assistance and funding, and the various services and awareness initiatives the organization provided.

In October 2016, Autism Speaks removed curing autism as a goal in its mission statement. The new mission statement also removed words such as "struggle", "hardship", and "crisis", to instead read, in part, that "Autism Speaks is dedicated to promoting solutions, across the spectrum and throughout the lifespan, for the needs of individuals with autism and their families".

=== Position on vaccines ===
Autism Speaks formerly assigned a high priority to research into the now-discredited claim that immunization is associated with an increased risk of autism. This raised concerns among parents and scientific researchers, because "funding such research, in addition to being wasteful, unduly heightens parents' concerns about the safety of immunization."

In a 2007 interview with The New York Times, board member Mel Karmazin described Autism Speaks as taking an "agnostic" stance on whether there was a link between vaccines and autism. At that time, the organization's founders were embroiled in a public feud with Katie Wright (their daughter and the mother of their autistic grandson), who demanded Autism Speaks formally recognize a causal link between vaccines and autism and fund research investigating such a link even more aggressively than it had been. In an interview that same year with David Kirby (the author of the 2005 anti-vaccination book Evidence of Harm), Katie Wright claimed that former NAAR leaders were instead advocating for genetic research and that Autism Speaks was bound by the terms of their merger to fund such research. She also claimed her parents were personally supportive of funding the research she was advocating for and said she hoped CAN leaders joining Autism Speaks would be able to counter the influence of the former NAAR leaders. In December 2019, an anonymous source close to early Autism Speaks leadership told Business Insider, "They created Autism Speaks by merging it with an organization that refuses to say autism is anything but genetic. ... It was putting the Palestinians and the Israelis in the same organization." In the same article, anti-vaccine activist and Autism Speaks donor Barry Segal claimed that Bob Wright "completely agreed" with his views during a discussion the two had in March 2011; he also claimed that Wright fired Roithmayr in 2012 at his behest. Robison told the publication that, during his time at Autism Speaks, it was ultimately up to Bob Wright and the organization's executive board to determine research priorities. Robison said that some members of the executive board were "anti-vaccinationists" who ignored scientific input; he was unsure if this had changed since his 2013 resignation.

In a 2008 interview, Dawson said it was the position of Autism Speaks that vaccines were safe for most children and that preventing measles, mumps and other diseases was very important to public health. However, Dawson qualified that research needed to continue to determine if a subset of people "responded poorly" to vaccines and "to understand the mechanisms behind [their] adverse reactions."

Alison Singer, a senior executive of Autism Speaks, resigned in January 2009 rather than vote to commit money to new studies of vaccination and autism. The U.S. Interagency Autism Coordinating Committee, of which Singer was a member, voted against committing the funds; this was contrary to the Autism Speaks policy on vaccine safety research. Singer said that "there isn't an unlimited pot of money, and every dollar spent looking where we know the answer isn't is one less dollar we have to spend where we might find new answers. The fact is that vaccines save lives; they don't cause autism." She said that numerous scientific studies have disproved the link first suggested more than a decade ago and that Autism Speaks needs to "move on". Later in 2009, along with NAAR's co-founder Karen London, Singer launched the Autism Science Foundation, a nonprofit organization supporting autism research premised on the principles that autism has a strong genetic component, that vaccines do not cause autism, and that evidence-based early diagnosis and intervention are critical. Autism Speaks' founder Bob Wright called Singer's resignation "disappointing and sad" and said that it is possible that autism is caused by vaccines, though this claim is scientifically inaccurate and has been rejected by all reputable medical organizations.

Eric London, a founding member of the Autism Science Foundation's Scientific Advisory Board, resigned from Autism Speaks' Scientific Affairs Committee in June 2009, saying that arguments that "there might be rare cases of 'biologically-plausible' vaccine involvement ... are misleading and disingenuous", and that Autism Speaks was "adversely impacting" autism research.

In March 2010, Autism Speaks said it would not completely abandon the idea that vaccines could cause autism and that it would support "research to determine whether subsets of individuals might be at increased risk for developing autism symptoms following vaccination".

In September 2010, a study by the U.S. Centers for Disease Control and Prevention found exposure to thimerosal, a preservative used in some vaccines, does not increase a child's risk of developing autism. Responding to the study, Autism Speaks' chief science officer said that the "study adds to a large body of evidence indicating that early thimerosal exposure through vaccination does not cause autism."

In August 2014, the organization said, "We strongly encourage parents to have their children vaccinated for protection against serious disease. We recognize that some parents still have concerns about vaccines, particularly if they have a child or relative with autism. We urge them to find a health practitioner who will consider their concerns and help them ensure the well-being of their child."

In February 2015, Autism Speaks issued a new position statement in response to recent measles outbreaks. Signed by its chief science officer, Rob Ring, the statement read, "Over the last two decades, extensive research has asked whether there is any link between childhood vaccinations and autism. The results of this research are clear: Vaccines do not cause autism. We urge that all children be fully vaccinated." In September 2015, Bob Wright sent an e-mail to Autism Speaks leadership characterizing Ring's statement as "unnecessarily argumentative" and praising then presidential candidate Donald Trump for suggesting alternative vaccine schedules as an accommodation for vaccine-hesitant parents.

In April 2025, in response to controversial statements made by anti-vaccine activist and U.S. Secretary of Health and Human Services Robert F. Kennedy Jr., Wargo cosigned a joint statement on behalf of Autism Speaks, affirming that vaccines did not cause autism and calling for public health messaging to be "grounded in science." The statement also rejected the claim that autism was "preventable," condemned the use of stigmatizing language, and warned against reductions in federal funding to departments, services and programs relied upon by the autistic community. The other cosignatories were representatives of ASAN, the Autism Society of America, the Arc of the United States, the Autistic Women & Nonbinary Network, and the Autistic People of Color Fund. Additional organizations endorsed the statement after its initial release.

It is scientific consensus that there is no link between any vaccine or vaccine ingredient and autism and that the thimerosal used as a preservative in some vaccines is not harmful.

=== Lack of autistic leadership ===
In December 2015, professor Stephen Shore and consultant Valerie Paradiz became the first two openly autistic people to sit on Autism Speaks' national board of directors. Prior to their board appointments, they both sat on the organization's family services committee. At the time, Shore said he believed Autism Speaks was in a period of transition precipitated by the resignations of various members of leadership (including Bob Wright and Feld) and stated the following:

After ten years of telling us, "[I]t's time to listen," Autism Speaks now visibly listening to people on the autism spectrum is a very good sign.

ASAN stated that Shore and Paradiz's appointments did not rectify the damage the organization had done to the autistic community, signal an appreciation of that damage, or reflect a willingness to change course. ASAN criticized Autism Speaks for systemically excluding autistic people from leadership, siphoning funds from local communities, spending a disproportionate amount of money on biomedical research and fundraising (while neglecting services and supports), and spreading "profoundly harmful language and rhetoric."

In response to the appointments, Robison said he hoped Autism Speaks would adopt a more constructive focus and stated, "I wish Valerie and Stephen all the success in the world in moving Autism Speaks onto a healthier course." Referring to Robison, Shore said that he and Paradiz stood "on the shoulders of giants."

In 2017, Julia Bascom (then ASAN's executive director) told Mother Jones that Autism Speaks was still focused too heavily on funding genetic research and accused the organization of failing to listen to or amplify the voices of autistic people. Shore told the publication he believed Autism Speaks was engaging with autistic people in a more meaningful way than in the past, but it would take more time for the organization to transition away from its focus on genetic research. He also said he would like to see more autistic people in positions of leadership; at that time, only two of the organization's 30 board members (Shore and Paradiz) were openly autistic.

In 2019, Robison once again commented on Shore and Paradiz joining Autism Speaks' board, stating that, while he applauded their appointments, he had yet to see the organization implement any "substantive autistic-led initiatives."

As of March 2026, ASAN's main points of criticism toward Autism Speaks had not changed. Further, ASAN noted that openly autistic members of the board still constituted a small minority (two of 27 members) while the majority (16 of 27) consisted of current and former representatives of major for-profit corporations. Among the board members at that time were current and former senior executives of AutoZone, Goldman Sachs, MasterCard, S.C. Johnson, SoundCloud, and White Castle.

As of October 2026, Shore still sits on Autism Speaks' board. Paradiz sat on the board through December 2018. The organization installed another openly autistic board member, former consultant and venture capitalist Judy Benardete, in April 2023. In 2026, it added openly autistic film and television composer John Frizzell to its website's list of board members.

== Spending ==
In 2009, Disability Scoop questioned Autism Speaks about its chief science officer, Geri Dawson, who received $669,751 in compensation in 2008, including $269,721 to relocate her family from Washington to North Carolina. Autism Speaks responded that Dawson's compensation was mid-range for executives with similar positions in the nonprofit health sector, and that Dawson's move benefited Autism Speaks because she would be more accessible to its offices, science divisions, government health agencies in Washington, D.C., and her new position at the University of North Carolina at Chapel Hill.

In 2012, Autism Speaks spent $2,252,334 on compensation for current officers, directors, trustees, and key employees, which The Daily Beast portrayed as controversial. Autism Speaks' former president Mark Roithmayr had a salary of $436,314 in 2012, and Chief Science Officer Geraldine Dawson earned $465,671.

Compared to other autism-focused nonprofit organizations, Autism Speaks spends a smaller percentage of its revenue on furthering its mission. According to a 2014 report by The Daily Beast, 70.9% of Autism Speaks' revenue is devoted to directly furthering its mission, compared to 79.8% of ASAN's revenue and 91.5% of Autism Science Foundation's revenue.

In 2018, Autism Speaks spent $19.6 million on employee benefits. Angela Geiger, the then president, earned more than $642,000, which was more than double the earnings of any other AS executive.

In 2019, while reflecting on his time with Autism Speaks, Robison stated the following regarding the organization's fundraising and spending:

Autism-as-tragedy helped them raise hundreds of millions of dollars. Groups like Charity Watch [sic] reported that they spent lavishly on themselves and their organization compared to other medical nonprofits. Their annual reports told a sad story. Monies raised locally paid headquarter’s [sic] salaries and supported distant researchers. Very little returned to the communities who raised the funds. Perhaps it’s all about the money, I thought, and my ideas of acceptance and fitting in are not a basis for tens of millions in donations the way “stolen children” and “ruined families” are.

Based on data for the organization's fiscal year ending March 31, 2020, Charity Navigator gave Autism Speaks a rating of three out of four stars with a financial rating of 77 out of 100, and accountability and transparency rating of 97 out of 100.

Autism Speaks' expenses exceeded its income during the fiscal years ending March 31, 2023, March 31, 2024, and March 31, 2025. The losses for those years totaled approximately $6.6 million, $5.8 million, and $5.4 million, respectively. The organization had approximately $26.9 million remaining in net assets at the conclusion of the fiscal year ending March 31, 2025, down from approximately $44.4 million at the conclusion of the fiscal year ending March 31, 2022.

== See also ==
- Autistic Pride Day
- Autism Sunday
- Autism awareness and recognition events
