= List of minor planets: 149001–150000 =

The following is a partial list of minor planets, running from minor-planet number 149001 through 150000, inclusive. The primary data for this and other partial lists is based on JPL's "Small-Body Orbital Elements" and data available from the Minor Planet Center. Critical list information is also provided by the MPC, unless otherwise specified from Lowell Observatory. A detailed description of the table's columns and additional sources are given on the main page including a complete list of every page in this series, and a statistical break-up on the dynamical classification of minor planets.

Also see the summary list of all named bodies in numerical and alphabetical order, and the corresponding naming citations for the number range of this particular list. New namings may only be added to this list after official publication, as the preannouncement of names is condemned by the Working Group for Small Bodies Nomenclature of the International Astronomical Union.

Near-Earth obj.	MBA (inner)	MBA (outer)	Centaur
Mars-crosser	MBA (middle)	Jupiter trojan	Trans-Neptunian obj.
Unclassified

== 149001–149100 ==
Designation			Discovery			Properties		Ref
Permanent	Provisional	Named after	Date	Site	Discoverer(s)	Category	Diam.	Ref
149001	2001 YJ_{136}	—	December 22, 2001	Socorro	LINEAR	·	4.1 km	MPC · JPL
149002	2001 YM_{139}	—	December 24, 2001	Palomar	NEAT	·	4.2 km	MPC · JPL
149003	2002 AB_{1}	—	January 4, 2002	Črni Vrh	Mikuž, H.	·	3.4 km	MPC · JPL
149004	2002 AR_{11}	—	January 7, 2002	Kitt Peak	Spacewatch	KOR	1.9 km	MPC · JPL
149005	2002 AY_{15}	—	January 4, 2002	Haleakala	NEAT	·	7.3 km	MPC · JPL
149006	2002 AS_{16}	—	January 4, 2002	Haleakala	NEAT	·	4.7 km	MPC · JPL
149007	2002 AJ_{32}	—	January 8, 2002	Haleakala	NEAT	·	2.8 km	MPC · JPL
149008	2002 AW_{36}	—	January 9, 2002	Socorro	LINEAR	MRX	1.7 km	MPC · JPL
149009	2002 AG_{42}	—	January 9, 2002	Socorro	LINEAR	·	3.0 km	MPC · JPL
149010	2002 AX_{43}	—	January 9, 2002	Socorro	LINEAR	·	2.5 km	MPC · JPL
149011	2002 AR_{44}	—	January 9, 2002	Socorro	LINEAR	·	2.4 km	MPC · JPL
149012	2002 AA_{45}	—	January 9, 2002	Socorro	LINEAR	·	3.4 km	MPC · JPL
149013	2002 AL_{46}	—	January 9, 2002	Socorro	LINEAR	KOR	2.2 km	MPC · JPL
149014	2002 AQ_{46}	—	January 9, 2002	Socorro	LINEAR	·	2.9 km	MPC · JPL
149015	2002 AY_{52}	—	January 9, 2002	Socorro	LINEAR	·	7.0 km	MPC · JPL
149016	2002 AP_{61}	—	January 11, 2002	Socorro	LINEAR	·	4.3 km	MPC · JPL
149017	2002 AU_{61}	—	January 11, 2002	Socorro	LINEAR	·	9.3 km	MPC · JPL
149018	2002 AL_{75}	—	January 8, 2002	Socorro	LINEAR	·	3.7 km	MPC · JPL
149019	2002 AC_{82}	—	January 9, 2002	Socorro	LINEAR	·	3.6 km	MPC · JPL
149020	2002 AL_{87}	—	January 9, 2002	Socorro	LINEAR	·	3.4 km	MPC · JPL
149021	2002 AS_{95}	—	January 8, 2002	Socorro	LINEAR	EOS	2.7 km	MPC · JPL
149022	2002 AB_{109}	—	January 9, 2002	Socorro	LINEAR	KOR	2.3 km	MPC · JPL
149023	2002 AR_{115}	—	January 9, 2002	Socorro	LINEAR	·	3.2 km	MPC · JPL
149024	2002 AH_{119}	—	January 9, 2002	Socorro	LINEAR	·	5.0 km	MPC · JPL
149025	2002 AU_{123}	—	January 9, 2002	Socorro	LINEAR	·	2.9 km	MPC · JPL
149026	2002 AR_{124}	—	January 9, 2002	Socorro	LINEAR	·	5.1 km	MPC · JPL
149027	2002 AR_{125}	—	January 11, 2002	Socorro	LINEAR	·	3.6 km	MPC · JPL
149028	2002 AU_{128}	—	January 14, 2002	Desert Eagle	W. K. Y. Yeung	H	1.2 km	MPC · JPL
149029	2002 AW_{149}	—	January 14, 2002	Socorro	LINEAR	·	3.3 km	MPC · JPL
149030	2002 AB_{155}	—	January 14, 2002	Socorro	LINEAR	·	6.6 km	MPC · JPL
149031	2002 AL_{156}	—	January 13, 2002	Socorro	LINEAR	·	3.5 km	MPC · JPL
149032	2002 AB_{163}	—	January 13, 2002	Socorro	LINEAR	·	3.2 km	MPC · JPL
149033	2002 AA_{169}	—	January 15, 2002	Socorro	LINEAR	·	6.9 km	MPC · JPL
149034	2002 AH_{169}	—	January 14, 2002	Socorro	LINEAR	GEF	2.0 km	MPC · JPL
149035	2002 AV_{170}	—	January 14, 2002	Socorro	LINEAR	·	4.0 km	MPC · JPL
149036	2002 AM_{176}	—	January 14, 2002	Socorro	LINEAR	·	4.5 km	MPC · JPL
149037	2002 AW_{176}	—	January 14, 2002	Socorro	LINEAR	EOS	2.9 km	MPC · JPL
149038	2002 AA_{178}	—	January 14, 2002	Socorro	LINEAR	THM	3.2 km	MPC · JPL
149039	2002 AZ_{193}	—	January 12, 2002	Kitt Peak	Spacewatch	·	3.1 km	MPC · JPL
149040	2002 AG_{194}	—	January 12, 2002	Kitt Peak	Spacewatch	·	3.1 km	MPC · JPL
149041	2002 AM_{198}	—	January 9, 2002	Socorro	LINEAR	KOR	2.0 km	MPC · JPL
149042	2002 AQ_{199}	—	January 8, 2002	Socorro	LINEAR	·	3.5 km	MPC · JPL
149043	2002 AT_{208}	—	January 9, 2002	Socorro	LINEAR	·	4.9 km	MPC · JPL
149044	2002 BV_{3}	—	January 18, 2002	Anderson Mesa	LONEOS	·	2.1 km	MPC · JPL
149045	2002 BE_{4}	—	January 19, 2002	Anderson Mesa	LONEOS	·	4.1 km	MPC · JPL
149046	2002 BU_{11}	—	January 19, 2002	Socorro	LINEAR	EOS	3.4 km	MPC · JPL
149047	2002 BE_{15}	—	January 19, 2002	Socorro	LINEAR	EOS ·	3.2 km	MPC · JPL
149048	2002 BP_{15}	—	January 19, 2002	Socorro	LINEAR	KOR	2.3 km	MPC · JPL
149049	2002 BP_{16}	—	January 19, 2002	Socorro	LINEAR	EOS	3.4 km	MPC · JPL
149050	2002 BN_{24}	—	January 23, 2002	Socorro	LINEAR	·	3.8 km	MPC · JPL
149051	2002 CU_{7}	—	February 6, 2002	Desert Eagle	W. K. Y. Yeung	·	3.7 km	MPC · JPL
149052	2002 CK_{12}	—	February 7, 2002	Socorro	LINEAR	H	940 m	MPC · JPL
149053	2002 CW_{12}	—	February 8, 2002	Fountain Hills	C. W. Juels, P. R. Holvorcem	·	8.0 km	MPC · JPL
149054	2002 CS_{16}	—	February 6, 2002	Socorro	LINEAR	·	3.0 km	MPC · JPL
149055	2002 CK_{18}	—	February 6, 2002	Socorro	LINEAR	·	4.4 km	MPC · JPL
149056	2002 CF_{20}	—	February 4, 2002	Palomar	NEAT	·	5.1 km	MPC · JPL
149057	2002 CC_{30}	—	February 6, 2002	Socorro	LINEAR	·	6.3 km	MPC · JPL
149058	2002 CU_{32}	—	February 6, 2002	Socorro	LINEAR	·	4.5 km	MPC · JPL
149059	2002 CB_{35}	—	February 6, 2002	Socorro	LINEAR	·	4.3 km	MPC · JPL
149060	2002 CA_{51}	—	February 12, 2002	Desert Eagle	W. K. Y. Yeung	EOS	3.5 km	MPC · JPL
149061	2002 CA_{57}	—	February 7, 2002	Socorro	LINEAR	HYG	4.8 km	MPC · JPL
149062	2002 CK_{59}	—	February 12, 2002	Desert Eagle	W. K. Y. Yeung	THM	3.8 km	MPC · JPL
149063	2002 CL_{59}	—	February 12, 2002	Desert Eagle	W. K. Y. Yeung	·	4.6 km	MPC · JPL
149064	2002 CW_{63}	—	February 6, 2002	Socorro	LINEAR	·	4.3 km	MPC · JPL
149065	2002 CV_{68}	—	February 7, 2002	Socorro	LINEAR	KOR	2.5 km	MPC · JPL
149066	2002 CW_{68}	—	February 7, 2002	Socorro	LINEAR	KOR	2.1 km	MPC · JPL
149067	2002 CA_{70}	—	February 7, 2002	Socorro	LINEAR	EOS	2.8 km	MPC · JPL
149068	2002 CS_{71}	—	February 7, 2002	Socorro	LINEAR	EOS	3.2 km	MPC · JPL
149069	2002 CD_{72}	—	February 7, 2002	Socorro	LINEAR	·	3.1 km	MPC · JPL
149070	2002 CM_{72}	—	February 7, 2002	Socorro	LINEAR	EOS	2.9 km	MPC · JPL
149071	2002 CP_{72}	—	February 7, 2002	Socorro	LINEAR	·	3.1 km	MPC · JPL
149072	2002 CV_{76}	—	February 7, 2002	Socorro	LINEAR	EOS	3.2 km	MPC · JPL
149073	2002 CA_{78}	—	February 7, 2002	Socorro	LINEAR	KOR	2.5 km	MPC · JPL
149074	2002 CN_{78}	—	February 7, 2002	Socorro	LINEAR	·	4.5 km	MPC · JPL
149075	2002 CK_{79}	—	February 7, 2002	Socorro	LINEAR	·	3.7 km	MPC · JPL
149076	2002 CG_{80}	—	February 7, 2002	Socorro	LINEAR	·	4.0 km	MPC · JPL
149077	2002 CX_{81}	—	February 7, 2002	Socorro	LINEAR	·	2.4 km	MPC · JPL
149078	2002 CB_{85}	—	February 7, 2002	Socorro	LINEAR	·	5.4 km	MPC · JPL
149079	2002 CQ_{85}	—	February 7, 2002	Socorro	LINEAR	·	6.1 km	MPC · JPL
149080	2002 CK_{88}	—	February 7, 2002	Socorro	LINEAR	·	3.9 km	MPC · JPL
149081	2002 CK_{89}	—	February 7, 2002	Socorro	LINEAR	·	3.8 km	MPC · JPL
149082	2002 CQ_{93}	—	February 7, 2002	Socorro	LINEAR	THM	5.8 km	MPC · JPL
149083	2002 CD_{95}	—	February 7, 2002	Socorro	LINEAR	·	2.9 km	MPC · JPL
149084	2002 CE_{100}	—	February 7, 2002	Socorro	LINEAR	THM	3.9 km	MPC · JPL
149085	2002 CT_{112}	—	February 8, 2002	Socorro	LINEAR	·	3.2 km	MPC · JPL
149086	2002 CM_{116}	—	February 15, 2002	Uccle	E. W. Elst, H. Debehogne	EOS	3.7 km	MPC · JPL
149087	2002 CC_{122}	—	February 7, 2002	Socorro	LINEAR	BRA	2.2 km	MPC · JPL
149088	2002 CJ_{122}	—	February 7, 2002	Socorro	LINEAR	NAE	5.1 km	MPC · JPL
149089	2002 CA_{131}	—	February 7, 2002	Socorro	LINEAR	EOS	2.6 km	MPC · JPL
149090	2002 CL_{132}	—	February 7, 2002	Socorro	LINEAR	KOR	2.0 km	MPC · JPL
149091	2002 CW_{136}	—	February 8, 2002	Socorro	LINEAR	URS	5.7 km	MPC · JPL
149092	2002 CH_{144}	—	February 9, 2002	Socorro	LINEAR	TEL	2.3 km	MPC · JPL
149093	2002 CK_{145}	—	February 9, 2002	Socorro	LINEAR	·	6.2 km	MPC · JPL
149094	2002 CT_{155}	—	February 6, 2002	Socorro	LINEAR	HYG	4.6 km	MPC · JPL
149095	2002 CQ_{156}	—	February 7, 2002	Socorro	LINEAR	KOR	2.1 km	MPC · JPL
149096	2002 CS_{158}	—	February 7, 2002	Socorro	LINEAR	·	3.3 km	MPC · JPL
149097	2002 CO_{159}	—	February 7, 2002	Socorro	LINEAR	·	6.5 km	MPC · JPL
149098	2002 CY_{164}	—	February 8, 2002	Socorro	LINEAR	(18466)	4.8 km	MPC · JPL
149099	2002 CA_{173}	—	February 8, 2002	Socorro	LINEAR	·	4.1 km	MPC · JPL
149100	2002 CH_{174}	—	February 8, 2002	Socorro	LINEAR	·	3.3 km	MPC · JPL

== 149101–149200 ==
back to top

Designation			Discovery			Properties		Ref
Permanent	Provisional	Named after	Date	Site	Discoverer(s)	Category	Diam.	Ref
149101	2002 CP_{179}	—	February 10, 2002	Socorro	LINEAR	·	3.0 km	MPC · JPL
149102	2002 CB_{198}	—	February 10, 2002	Socorro	LINEAR	·	3.3 km	MPC · JPL
149103	2002 CH_{203}	—	February 10, 2002	Socorro	LINEAR	·	4.3 km	MPC · JPL
149104	2002 CK_{205}	—	February 10, 2002	Socorro	LINEAR	EOS	3.6 km	MPC · JPL
149105	2002 CX_{205}	—	February 10, 2002	Socorro	LINEAR	·	2.8 km	MPC · JPL
149106	2002 CD_{206}	—	February 10, 2002	Socorro	LINEAR	slow	5.0 km	MPC · JPL
149107	2002 CD_{208}	—	February 10, 2002	Socorro	LINEAR	·	5.3 km	MPC · JPL
149108	2002 CO_{209}	—	February 10, 2002	Socorro	LINEAR	·	3.0 km	MPC · JPL
149109	2002 CD_{211}	—	February 10, 2002	Socorro	LINEAR	·	4.6 km	MPC · JPL
149110	2002 CO_{216}	—	February 10, 2002	Socorro	LINEAR	·	3.8 km	MPC · JPL
149111	2002 CJ_{219}	—	February 10, 2002	Socorro	LINEAR	HYG	4.7 km	MPC · JPL
149112	2002 CU_{233}	—	February 11, 2002	Socorro	LINEAR	·	5.7 km	MPC · JPL
149113 Stewartbushman	2002 CK_{258}	Stewartbushman	February 6, 2002	Kitt Peak	M. W. Buie	·	3.3 km	MPC · JPL
149114	2002 CX_{259}	—	February 7, 2002	Palomar	NEAT	·	5.6 km	MPC · JPL
149115 Lauriecantillo	2002 CG_{271}	Lauriecantillo	February 8, 2002	Kitt Peak	M. W. Buie	EOS	2.7 km	MPC · JPL
149116	2002 CA_{285}	—	February 9, 2002	Kitt Peak	Spacewatch	KOR	2.5 km	MPC · JPL
149117	2002 CC_{300}	—	February 11, 2002	Socorro	LINEAR	·	2.4 km	MPC · JPL
149118	2002 CS_{310}	—	February 8, 2002	Socorro	LINEAR	·	4.2 km	MPC · JPL
149119	2002 DX	—	February 16, 2002	Bohyunsan	Bohyunsan	THM	4.2 km	MPC · JPL
149120	2002 DL_{2}	—	February 19, 2002	Socorro	LINEAR	H	1.0 km	MPC · JPL
149121	2002 DZ_{7}	—	February 19, 2002	Socorro	LINEAR	·	3.8 km	MPC · JPL
149122	2002 EM_{12}	—	March 14, 2002	Desert Eagle	W. K. Y. Yeung	·	4.9 km	MPC · JPL
149123	2002 EW_{15}	—	March 6, 2002	Palomar	NEAT	·	5.0 km	MPC · JPL
149124	2002 EF_{19}	—	March 9, 2002	Palomar	NEAT	·	4.9 km	MPC · JPL
149125	2002 EQ_{24}	—	March 5, 2002	Kitt Peak	Spacewatch	·	3.4 km	MPC · JPL
149126	2002 EW_{25}	—	March 10, 2002	Anderson Mesa	LONEOS	·	3.9 km	MPC · JPL
149127	2002 EK_{28}	—	March 9, 2002	Socorro	LINEAR	·	5.4 km	MPC · JPL
149128	2002 EX_{28}	—	March 9, 2002	Socorro	LINEAR	·	3.2 km	MPC · JPL
149129	2002 EQ_{49}	—	March 12, 2002	Palomar	NEAT	·	4.4 km	MPC · JPL
149130	2002 ES_{52}	—	March 9, 2002	Socorro	LINEAR	THM	4.3 km	MPC · JPL
149131	2002 EX_{59}	—	March 13, 2002	Socorro	LINEAR	KOR	2.3 km	MPC · JPL
149132	2002 EA_{60}	—	March 13, 2002	Socorro	LINEAR	·	5.9 km	MPC · JPL
149133	2002 ET_{61}	—	March 13, 2002	Socorro	LINEAR	·	2.2 km	MPC · JPL
149134	2002 ES_{64}	—	March 13, 2002	Socorro	LINEAR	·	3.1 km	MPC · JPL
149135	2002 EX_{70}	—	March 13, 2002	Socorro	LINEAR	·	6.7 km	MPC · JPL
149136	2002 EE_{75}	—	March 13, 2002	Socorro	LINEAR	THM	3.9 km	MPC · JPL
149137	2002 ER_{86}	—	March 9, 2002	Socorro	LINEAR	·	6.5 km	MPC · JPL
149138	2002 EV_{89}	—	March 12, 2002	Socorro	LINEAR	·	4.2 km	MPC · JPL
149139	2002 EX_{93}	—	March 14, 2002	Socorro	LINEAR	EOS	4.3 km	MPC · JPL
149140	2002 EQ_{95}	—	March 14, 2002	Socorro	LINEAR	HYG	3.6 km	MPC · JPL
149141	2002 EO_{103}	—	March 9, 2002	Anderson Mesa	LONEOS	VER	5.9 km	MPC · JPL
149142	2002 EH_{104}	—	March 9, 2002	Anderson Mesa	LONEOS	·	4.7 km	MPC · JPL
149143	2002 EA_{105}	—	March 9, 2002	Anderson Mesa	LONEOS	·	4.5 km	MPC · JPL
149144	2002 ED_{117}	—	March 9, 2002	Kitt Peak	Spacewatch	·	5.1 km	MPC · JPL
149145	2002 EJ_{120}	—	March 11, 2002	Kitt Peak	Spacewatch	·	3.3 km	MPC · JPL
149146	2002 EO_{125}	—	March 10, 2002	Kitt Peak	Spacewatch	·	6.9 km	MPC · JPL
149147	2002 EZ_{128}	—	March 13, 2002	Kitt Peak	Spacewatch	·	3.8 km	MPC · JPL
149148	2002 EJ_{129}	—	March 13, 2002	Socorro	LINEAR	·	4.9 km	MPC · JPL
149149	2002 EM_{141}	—	March 12, 2002	Palomar	NEAT	·	3.8 km	MPC · JPL
149150	2002 EO_{141}	—	March 12, 2002	Palomar	NEAT	·	3.8 km	MPC · JPL
149151	2002 EF_{148}	—	March 15, 2002	Palomar	NEAT	·	4.9 km	MPC · JPL
149152	2002 EE_{149}	—	March 15, 2002	Palomar	NEAT	·	4.4 km	MPC · JPL
149153	2002 FK	—	March 16, 2002	Desert Eagle	W. K. Y. Yeung	HYG	6.0 km	MPC · JPL
149154	2002 FL_{11}	—	March 16, 2002	Socorro	LINEAR	THM	3.0 km	MPC · JPL
149155	2002 FF_{12}	—	March 16, 2002	Socorro	LINEAR	·	6.5 km	MPC · JPL
149156	2002 FS_{22}	—	March 19, 2002	Palomar	NEAT	·	6.4 km	MPC · JPL
149157 Stephencarr	2002 FN_{26}	Stephencarr	March 20, 2002	Kitt Peak	M. W. Buie	(159)	3.3 km	MPC · JPL
149158	2002 FQ_{29}	—	March 20, 2002	Socorro	LINEAR	·	6.0 km	MPC · JPL
149159	2002 FG_{33}	—	March 20, 2002	Socorro	LINEAR	AEG	5.1 km	MPC · JPL
149160 Geojih	2002 GE	Geojih	April 1, 2002	Kleť	KLENOT	HOF	5.4 km	MPC · JPL
149161	2002 GW_{10}	—	April 10, 2002	Socorro	LINEAR	H	950 m	MPC · JPL
149162	2002 GX_{10}	—	April 10, 2002	Socorro	LINEAR	H	1.1 km	MPC · JPL
149163 Stevenconard	2002 GF_{31}	Stevenconard	April 7, 2002	Cerro Tololo	M. W. Buie	·	6.7 km	MPC · JPL
149164	2002 GX_{36}	—	April 2, 2002	Palomar	NEAT	·	4.6 km	MPC · JPL
149165	2002 GX_{54}	—	April 5, 2002	Anderson Mesa	LONEOS	·	5.8 km	MPC · JPL
149166	2002 GL_{91}	—	April 9, 2002	Kitt Peak	Spacewatch	·	5.2 km	MPC · JPL
149167	2002 GH_{105}	—	April 11, 2002	Anderson Mesa	LONEOS	·	4.6 km	MPC · JPL
149168	2002 GR_{109}	—	April 11, 2002	Palomar	NEAT	URS	5.4 km	MPC · JPL
149169	2002 GK_{122}	—	April 10, 2002	Socorro	LINEAR	HYG	4.9 km	MPC · JPL
149170	2002 GT_{122}	—	April 10, 2002	Socorro	LINEAR	·	5.2 km	MPC · JPL
149171	2002 GE_{146}	—	April 13, 2002	Palomar	NEAT	·	4.8 km	MPC · JPL
149172	2002 GH_{146}	—	April 13, 2002	Palomar	NEAT	HYG	4.1 km	MPC · JPL
149173	2002 HO_{13}	—	April 22, 2002	Socorro	LINEAR	EUP	6.5 km	MPC · JPL
149174	2002 JX_{3}	—	May 5, 2002	Socorro	LINEAR	·	6.9 km	MPC · JPL
149175	2002 JB_{4}	—	May 5, 2002	Socorro	LINEAR	H	1.4 km	MPC · JPL
149176	2002 JN_{4}	—	May 4, 2002	Socorro	LINEAR	H	1.2 km	MPC · JPL
149177	2002 JQ_{4}	—	May 5, 2002	Socorro	LINEAR	·	8.8 km	MPC · JPL
149178	2002 JF_{40}	—	May 8, 2002	Socorro	LINEAR	·	5.0 km	MPC · JPL
149179	2002 JV_{40}	—	May 8, 2002	Socorro	LINEAR	HYG	6.2 km	MPC · JPL
149180	2002 JD_{60}	—	May 9, 2002	Socorro	LINEAR	·	6.1 km	MPC · JPL
149181	2002 JU_{61}	—	May 8, 2002	Socorro	LINEAR	·	2.3 km	MPC · JPL
149182	2002 JX_{69}	—	May 7, 2002	Socorro	LINEAR	EUP ·	6.4 km	MPC · JPL
149183	2002 JV_{75}	—	May 11, 2002	Socorro	LINEAR	fast	5.3 km	MPC · JPL
149184	2002 JF_{81}	—	May 11, 2002	Socorro	LINEAR	·	5.1 km	MPC · JPL
149185	2002 JA_{105}	—	May 12, 2002	Socorro	LINEAR	·	1.2 km	MPC · JPL
149186	2002 JJ_{115}	—	May 6, 2002	Socorro	LINEAR	H	1.3 km	MPC · JPL
149187	2002 JQ_{120}	—	May 5, 2002	Kitt Peak	Spacewatch	·	1.0 km	MPC · JPL
149188	2002 JX_{144}	—	May 13, 2002	Palomar	NEAT	·	4.7 km	MPC · JPL
149189	2002 KU_{7}	—	May 28, 2002	Palomar	NEAT	·	7.6 km	MPC · JPL
149190	2002 LZ_{8}	—	June 5, 2002	Socorro	LINEAR	·	1.1 km	MPC · JPL
149191	2002 LM_{12}	—	June 5, 2002	Socorro	LINEAR	·	1.1 km	MPC · JPL
149192	2002 LH_{20}	—	June 6, 2002	Socorro	LINEAR	·	1.5 km	MPC · JPL
149193	2002 LO_{27}	—	June 8, 2002	Socorro	LINEAR	·	2.2 km	MPC · JPL
149194	2002 NF_{45}	—	July 12, 2002	Palomar	NEAT	·	1.3 km	MPC · JPL
149195 Lucianaziino	2002 PH	Lucianaziino	August 1, 2002	Campo Imperatore	CINEOS	·	840 m	MPC · JPL
149196	2002 PR_{24}	—	August 6, 2002	Palomar	NEAT	·	1.2 km	MPC · JPL
149197	2002 PA_{29}	—	August 6, 2002	Palomar	NEAT	·	1.2 km	MPC · JPL
149198	2002 PZ_{31}	—	August 6, 2002	Palomar	NEAT	·	1.3 km	MPC · JPL
149199	2002 PH_{37}	—	August 5, 2002	Socorro	LINEAR	·	1.6 km	MPC · JPL
149200	2002 PH_{42}	—	August 5, 2002	Socorro	LINEAR	·	1.7 km	MPC · JPL

== 149201–149300 ==
back to top

Designation			Discovery			Properties		Ref
Permanent	Provisional	Named after	Date	Site	Discoverer(s)	Category	Diam.	Ref
149201	2002 PC_{44}	—	August 5, 2002	Socorro	LINEAR	·	2.1 km	MPC · JPL
149202	2002 PG_{63}	—	August 8, 2002	Palomar	NEAT	·	1.8 km	MPC · JPL
149203	2002 PW_{74}	—	August 12, 2002	Socorro	LINEAR	·	1.4 km	MPC · JPL
149204	2002 PF_{83}	—	August 10, 2002	Socorro	LINEAR	·	2.5 km	MPC · JPL
149205	2002 PU_{119}	—	August 13, 2002	Anderson Mesa	LONEOS	·	2.0 km	MPC · JPL
149206	2002 PT_{129}	—	August 15, 2002	Anderson Mesa	LONEOS	(5)	2.3 km	MPC · JPL
149207	2002 PB_{130}	—	August 15, 2002	Socorro	LINEAR	·	1.6 km	MPC · JPL
149208	2002 PP_{159}	—	August 8, 2002	Palomar	S. F. Hönig	NYS	1.3 km	MPC · JPL
149209	2002 PH_{160}	—	August 8, 2002	Palomar	S. F. Hönig	·	1.3 km	MPC · JPL
149210	2002 QR_{23}	—	August 28, 2002	Palomar	NEAT	·	1.2 km	MPC · JPL
149211	2002 QN_{28}	—	August 29, 2002	Palomar	NEAT	·	1.4 km	MPC · JPL
149212	2002 QD_{60}	—	August 26, 2002	Palomar	NEAT	·	1.6 km	MPC · JPL
149213	2002 QN_{71}	—	August 28, 2002	Palomar	NEAT	·	1.4 km	MPC · JPL
149214	2002 QT_{84}	—	August 30, 2002	Palomar	NEAT	·	1.5 km	MPC · JPL
149215	2002 RX_{2}	—	September 4, 2002	Anderson Mesa	LONEOS	·	1.8 km	MPC · JPL
149216	2002 RB_{16}	—	September 4, 2002	Anderson Mesa	LONEOS	·	2.0 km	MPC · JPL
149217	2002 RS_{21}	—	September 4, 2002	Anderson Mesa	LONEOS	·	1.4 km	MPC · JPL
149218	2002 RJ_{23}	—	September 4, 2002	Anderson Mesa	LONEOS	·	1.9 km	MPC · JPL
149219	2002 RE_{33}	—	September 4, 2002	Anderson Mesa	LONEOS	(2076)	1.5 km	MPC · JPL
149220	2002 RL_{56}	—	September 5, 2002	Anderson Mesa	LONEOS	·	2.9 km	MPC · JPL
149221	2002 RJ_{63}	—	September 5, 2002	Socorro	LINEAR	·	2.2 km	MPC · JPL
149222	2002 RA_{64}	—	September 5, 2002	Socorro	LINEAR	·	1.5 km	MPC · JPL
149223	2002 RM_{65}	—	September 5, 2002	Socorro	LINEAR	·	2.3 km	MPC · JPL
149224	2002 RK_{78}	—	September 5, 2002	Socorro	LINEAR	MAS	910 m	MPC · JPL
149225	2002 RC_{83}	—	September 5, 2002	Socorro	LINEAR	·	2.6 km	MPC · JPL
149226	2002 RQ_{92}	—	September 5, 2002	Socorro	LINEAR	·	1.0 km	MPC · JPL
149227	2002 RJ_{94}	—	September 5, 2002	Socorro	LINEAR	·	1.5 km	MPC · JPL
149228	2002 RA_{102}	—	September 5, 2002	Socorro	LINEAR	·	2.2 km	MPC · JPL
149229	2002 RC_{104}	—	September 5, 2002	Socorro	LINEAR	V	1.3 km	MPC · JPL
149230	2002 RM_{108}	—	September 5, 2002	Haleakala	NEAT	·	2.4 km	MPC · JPL
149231	2002 RK_{111}	—	September 6, 2002	Socorro	LINEAR	·	1.5 km	MPC · JPL
149232	2002 RJ_{118}	—	September 5, 2002	Anderson Mesa	LONEOS	·	2.2 km	MPC · JPL
149233 Bartolofazio	2002 RP_{118}	Bartolofazio	September 7, 2002	Campo Imperatore	CINEOS	·	1.1 km	MPC · JPL
149234	2002 RE_{135}	—	September 10, 2002	Haleakala	NEAT	·	930 m	MPC · JPL
149235	2002 RJ_{136}	—	September 11, 2002	Haleakala	NEAT	·	1.7 km	MPC · JPL
149236	2002 RX_{147}	—	September 11, 2002	Palomar	NEAT	·	1.7 km	MPC · JPL
149237	2002 RE_{172}	—	September 13, 2002	Anderson Mesa	LONEOS	ERI	3.0 km	MPC · JPL
149238	2002 RB_{179}	—	September 14, 2002	Palomar	NEAT	·	3.2 km	MPC · JPL
149239	2002 RO_{192}	—	September 12, 2002	Palomar	NEAT	·	1.1 km	MPC · JPL
149240	2002 RX_{207}	—	September 14, 2002	Haleakala	NEAT	·	1.5 km	MPC · JPL
149241	2002 RA_{211}	—	September 15, 2002	Kitt Peak	Spacewatch	·	2.5 km	MPC · JPL
149242	2002 RG_{224}	—	September 13, 2002	Anderson Mesa	LONEOS	·	1.2 km	MPC · JPL
149243 Dorothynorton	2002 RL_{239}	Dorothynorton	September 14, 2002	Palomar	R. Matson	·	1.4 km	MPC · JPL
149244 Kriegh	2002 RZ_{240}	Kriegh	September 14, 2002	Palomar	R. Matson	·	1.0 km	MPC · JPL
149245	2002 SJ_{23}	—	September 27, 2002	Palomar	NEAT	·	2.5 km	MPC · JPL
149246	2002 SH_{38}	—	September 30, 2002	Socorro	LINEAR	·	1.0 km	MPC · JPL
149247	2002 SF_{39}	—	September 30, 2002	Socorro	LINEAR	·	1.9 km	MPC · JPL
149248	2002 SY_{44}	—	September 29, 2002	Kitt Peak	Spacewatch	·	1.1 km	MPC · JPL
149249	2002 SZ_{44}	—	September 29, 2002	Haleakala	NEAT	·	1.1 km	MPC · JPL
149250	2002 SC_{49}	—	September 30, 2002	Socorro	LINEAR	·	5.8 km	MPC · JPL
149251	2002 SL_{50}	—	September 30, 2002	Haleakala	NEAT	·	3.0 km	MPC · JPL
149252	2002 TJ	—	October 1, 2002	Anderson Mesa	LONEOS	·	1.6 km	MPC · JPL
149253	2002 TV_{4}	—	October 1, 2002	Socorro	LINEAR	·	1.7 km	MPC · JPL
149254	2002 TQ_{6}	—	October 1, 2002	Socorro	LINEAR	·	1.9 km	MPC · JPL
149255	2002 TX_{8}	—	October 1, 2002	Haleakala	NEAT	·	1.2 km	MPC · JPL
149256	2002 TD_{14}	—	October 1, 2002	Anderson Mesa	LONEOS	V	920 m	MPC · JPL
149257	2002 TH_{20}	—	October 2, 2002	Socorro	LINEAR	·	1.3 km	MPC · JPL
149258	2002 TS_{25}	—	October 2, 2002	Socorro	LINEAR	·	1.9 km	MPC · JPL
149259	2002 TQ_{29}	—	October 2, 2002	Socorro	LINEAR	(5)	2.1 km	MPC · JPL
149260	2002 TW_{31}	—	October 2, 2002	Socorro	LINEAR	·	2.5 km	MPC · JPL
149261	2002 TB_{33}	—	October 2, 2002	Socorro	LINEAR	·	2.2 km	MPC · JPL
149262	2002 TY_{40}	—	October 2, 2002	Socorro	LINEAR	·	4.2 km	MPC · JPL
149263	2002 TV_{42}	—	October 2, 2002	Socorro	LINEAR	V	1.2 km	MPC · JPL
149264	2002 TK_{44}	—	October 2, 2002	Haleakala	NEAT	·	2.1 km	MPC · JPL
149265	2002 TH_{53}	—	October 2, 2002	Socorro	LINEAR	·	3.6 km	MPC · JPL
149266	2002 TE_{54}	—	October 2, 2002	Socorro	LINEAR	NYS	1.2 km	MPC · JPL
149267	2002 TL_{58}	—	October 1, 2002	Anderson Mesa	LONEOS	PHO	2.0 km	MPC · JPL
149268	2002 TP_{58}	—	October 2, 2002	Needville	J. Dellinger	(2076)	950 m	MPC · JPL
149269	2002 TS_{58}	—	October 2, 2002	Needville	J. Dellinger	·	1.8 km	MPC · JPL
149270 Andreacimatti	2002 TG_{70}	Andreacimatti	October 2, 2002	Campo Imperatore	CINEOS	·	1.4 km	MPC · JPL
149271	2002 TP_{73}	—	October 3, 2002	Palomar	NEAT	·	1.3 km	MPC · JPL
149272	2002 TC_{78}	—	October 1, 2002	Anderson Mesa	LONEOS	·	990 m	MPC · JPL
149273	2002 TQ_{79}	—	October 1, 2002	Socorro	LINEAR	·	1.8 km	MPC · JPL
149274	2002 TS_{79}	—	October 1, 2002	Socorro	LINEAR	·	2.0 km	MPC · JPL
149275	2002 TW_{91}	—	October 4, 2002	Socorro	LINEAR	·	1.2 km	MPC · JPL
149276	2002 TL_{109}	—	October 2, 2002	Haleakala	NEAT	·	1.0 km	MPC · JPL
149277	2002 TS_{115}	—	October 3, 2002	Palomar	NEAT	BAP	1.9 km	MPC · JPL
149278	2002 TS_{118}	—	October 3, 2002	Palomar	NEAT	·	2.8 km	MPC · JPL
149279	2002 TP_{120}	—	October 3, 2002	Palomar	NEAT	·	1.2 km	MPC · JPL
149280	2002 TU_{126}	—	October 4, 2002	Socorro	LINEAR	·	1.8 km	MPC · JPL
149281	2002 TB_{135}	—	October 4, 2002	Palomar	NEAT	·	2.1 km	MPC · JPL
149282	2002 TU_{138}	—	October 4, 2002	Anderson Mesa	LONEOS	·	1.2 km	MPC · JPL
149283	2002 TT_{142}	—	October 4, 2002	Socorro	LINEAR	·	1.5 km	MPC · JPL
149284	2002 TH_{143}	—	October 4, 2002	Socorro	LINEAR	V	1.0 km	MPC · JPL
149285	2002 TV_{203}	—	October 4, 2002	Socorro	LINEAR	·	1.4 km	MPC · JPL
149286	2002 TN_{204}	—	October 4, 2002	Socorro	LINEAR	·	1.2 km	MPC · JPL
149287	2002 TV_{205}	—	October 4, 2002	Socorro	LINEAR	·	1.4 km	MPC · JPL
149288	2002 TD_{211}	—	October 7, 2002	Socorro	LINEAR	·	1.8 km	MPC · JPL
149289	2002 TH_{223}	—	October 7, 2002	Socorro	LINEAR	(5)	1.7 km	MPC · JPL
149290	2002 TO_{226}	—	October 8, 2002	Anderson Mesa	LONEOS	·	1.8 km	MPC · JPL
149291	2002 TJ_{228}	—	October 6, 2002	Haleakala	NEAT	·	1.8 km	MPC · JPL
149292	2002 TS_{236}	—	October 6, 2002	Socorro	LINEAR	·	2.1 km	MPC · JPL
149293	2002 TN_{238}	—	October 7, 2002	Anderson Mesa	LONEOS	·	1.9 km	MPC · JPL
149294	2002 TS_{250}	—	October 7, 2002	Anderson Mesa	LONEOS	·	1.9 km	MPC · JPL
149295	2002 TC_{252}	—	October 8, 2002	Anderson Mesa	LONEOS	·	1.1 km	MPC · JPL
149296	2002 TC_{272}	—	October 9, 2002	Socorro	LINEAR	·	1.2 km	MPC · JPL
149297	2002 TM_{280}	—	October 10, 2002	Socorro	LINEAR	·	1.7 km	MPC · JPL
149298	2002 TS_{280}	—	October 10, 2002	Socorro	LINEAR	V	1.1 km	MPC · JPL
149299	2002 TK_{281}	—	October 10, 2002	Socorro	LINEAR	·	1.4 km	MPC · JPL
149300	2002 TK_{287}	—	October 10, 2002	Socorro	LINEAR	V	1.1 km	MPC · JPL

== 149301–149400 ==
back to top

Designation			Discovery			Properties		Ref
Permanent	Provisional	Named after	Date	Site	Discoverer(s)	Category	Diam.	Ref
149301	2002 TF_{292}	—	October 10, 2002	Socorro	LINEAR	·	1.3 km	MPC · JPL
149302	2002 TJ_{292}	—	October 10, 2002	Socorro	LINEAR	·	1.2 km	MPC · JPL
149303	2002 TT_{295}	—	October 13, 2002	Palomar	NEAT	EUN	2.4 km	MPC · JPL
149304	2002 TH_{297}	—	October 11, 2002	Socorro	LINEAR	·	1.5 km	MPC · JPL
149305	2002 TL_{376}	—	October 9, 2002	Palomar	NEAT	·	1.8 km	MPC · JPL
149306	2002 UF_{1}	—	October 28, 2002	Kitt Peak	Spacewatch	·	1.7 km	MPC · JPL
149307	2002 UQ_{1}	—	October 28, 2002	Tenagra II	C. W. Juels, P. R. Holvorcem	AGN	2.3 km	MPC · JPL
149308	2002 UE_{2}	—	October 26, 2002	Haleakala	NEAT	·	2.1 km	MPC · JPL
149309	2002 UJ_{4}	—	October 28, 2002	Socorro	LINEAR	HNS	2.5 km	MPC · JPL
149310	2002 UY_{19}	—	October 30, 2002	Haleakala	NEAT	·	2.4 km	MPC · JPL
149311	2002 UR_{25}	—	October 30, 2002	Haleakala	NEAT	·	1.1 km	MPC · JPL
149312	2002 UQ_{32}	—	October 30, 2002	Haleakala	NEAT	·	2.9 km	MPC · JPL
149313	2002 UT_{32}	—	October 30, 2002	Kvistaberg	Uppsala-DLR Asteroid Survey	·	1.6 km	MPC · JPL
149314	2002 UX_{33}	—	October 31, 2002	Kitt Peak	Spacewatch	HNS	2.6 km	MPC · JPL
149315	2002 UL_{34}	—	October 30, 2002	Palomar	NEAT	·	1.9 km	MPC · JPL
149316	2002 UF_{37}	—	October 31, 2002	Anderson Mesa	LONEOS	MAR	1.5 km	MPC · JPL
149317	2002 UO_{49}	—	October 31, 2002	Socorro	LINEAR	·	3.2 km	MPC · JPL
149318	2002 UW_{70}	—	October 31, 2002	Haleakala	NEAT	·	4.2 km	MPC · JPL
149319	2002 VB	—	November 1, 2002	Pla D'Arguines	D'Arguines, Pla	·	2.9 km	MPC · JPL
149320	2002 VG_{13}	—	November 4, 2002	Palomar	NEAT	·	2.1 km	MPC · JPL
149321	2002 VH_{15}	—	November 6, 2002	Socorro	LINEAR	·	1.2 km	MPC · JPL
149322	2002 VM_{21}	—	November 5, 2002	Socorro	LINEAR	·	1.2 km	MPC · JPL
149323	2002 VB_{22}	—	November 5, 2002	Socorro	LINEAR	·	1.1 km	MPC · JPL
149324	2002 VZ_{26}	—	November 5, 2002	Socorro	LINEAR	·	1.3 km	MPC · JPL
149325	2002 VY_{31}	—	November 5, 2002	Socorro	LINEAR	NYS	1.7 km	MPC · JPL
149326	2002 VM_{36}	—	November 5, 2002	Socorro	LINEAR	·	2.4 km	MPC · JPL
149327	2002 VP_{39}	—	November 5, 2002	Socorro	LINEAR	PHO	1.3 km	MPC · JPL
149328	2002 VQ_{39}	—	November 5, 2002	Socorro	LINEAR	·	1.2 km	MPC · JPL
149329	2002 VP_{42}	—	November 6, 2002	Socorro	LINEAR	(5)	1.9 km	MPC · JPL
149330	2002 VD_{46}	—	November 5, 2002	Palomar	NEAT	·	1.9 km	MPC · JPL
149331	2002 VH_{50}	—	November 5, 2002	Anderson Mesa	LONEOS	·	1.7 km	MPC · JPL
149332	2002 VR_{61}	—	November 5, 2002	Socorro	LINEAR	·	1.7 km	MPC · JPL
149333	2002 VX_{62}	—	November 6, 2002	Socorro	LINEAR	V	1.1 km	MPC · JPL
149334	2002 VK_{67}	—	November 7, 2002	Socorro	LINEAR	·	2.5 km	MPC · JPL
149335	2002 VW_{68}	—	November 7, 2002	Anderson Mesa	LONEOS	·	1.5 km	MPC · JPL
149336	2002 VS_{71}	—	November 7, 2002	Socorro	LINEAR	·	2.4 km	MPC · JPL
149337	2002 VD_{78}	—	November 7, 2002	Socorro	LINEAR	·	1.5 km	MPC · JPL
149338	2002 VV_{78}	—	November 7, 2002	Socorro	LINEAR	·	1.7 km	MPC · JPL
149339	2002 VZ_{79}	—	November 7, 2002	Socorro	LINEAR	·	1.4 km	MPC · JPL
149340	2002 VD_{86}	—	November 8, 2002	Socorro	LINEAR	·	1.8 km	MPC · JPL
149341	2002 VZ_{88}	—	November 11, 2002	Anderson Mesa	LONEOS	(2076)	2.1 km	MPC · JPL
149342	2002 VD_{96}	—	November 11, 2002	Anderson Mesa	LONEOS	·	1.1 km	MPC · JPL
149343	2002 VT_{96}	—	November 11, 2002	Socorro	LINEAR	V	1.2 km	MPC · JPL
149344	2002 VT_{108}	—	November 12, 2002	Socorro	LINEAR	NYS	1.5 km	MPC · JPL
149345	2002 VB_{121}	—	November 12, 2002	Palomar	NEAT	·	2.1 km	MPC · JPL
149346	2002 VF_{121}	—	November 12, 2002	Palomar	NEAT	·	3.9 km	MPC · JPL
149347	2002 VN_{127}	—	November 14, 2002	Socorro	LINEAR	·	2.0 km	MPC · JPL
149348	2002 VS_{130}	—	November 7, 2002	Kitt Peak	M. W. Buie	cubewano (cold)	182 km	MPC · JPL
149349	2002 VA_{131}	—	November 9, 2002	Kitt Peak	M. W. Buie	res · 3:5	170 km	MPC · JPL
149350	2002 VR_{134}	—	November 6, 2002	Socorro	LINEAR	·	2.4 km	MPC · JPL
149351	2002 WD_{8}	—	November 24, 2002	Palomar	NEAT	NYS	1.5 km	MPC · JPL
149352	2002 WJ_{15}	—	November 28, 2002	Anderson Mesa	LONEOS	V	960 m	MPC · JPL
149353	2002 XN_{5}	—	December 1, 2002	Socorro	LINEAR	MAS	1.0 km	MPC · JPL
149354	2002 XF_{19}	—	December 2, 2002	Socorro	LINEAR	·	1.6 km	MPC · JPL
149355	2002 XO_{24}	—	December 5, 2002	Socorro	LINEAR	NYS	1.6 km	MPC · JPL
149356	2002 XR_{28}	—	December 5, 2002	Socorro	LINEAR	NYS	1.5 km	MPC · JPL
149357	2002 XP_{33}	—	December 5, 2002	Socorro	LINEAR	·	1.6 km	MPC · JPL
149358	2002 XQ_{33}	—	December 5, 2002	Socorro	LINEAR	·	2.0 km	MPC · JPL
149359	2002 XW_{35}	—	December 5, 2002	Socorro	LINEAR	·	1.5 km	MPC · JPL
149360	2002 XD_{36}	—	December 5, 2002	Socorro	LINEAR	·	2.0 km	MPC · JPL
149361	2002 XH_{36}	—	December 5, 2002	Socorro	LINEAR	·	2.5 km	MPC · JPL
149362	2002 XZ_{41}	—	December 6, 2002	Socorro	LINEAR	·	2.0 km	MPC · JPL
149363	2002 XD_{45}	—	December 8, 2002	Haleakala	NEAT	V	1.0 km	MPC · JPL
149364	2002 XQ_{47}	—	December 10, 2002	Socorro	LINEAR	·	2.3 km	MPC · JPL
149365	2002 XZ_{50}	—	December 10, 2002	Socorro	LINEAR	NYS	1.7 km	MPC · JPL
149366	2002 XO_{52}	—	December 10, 2002	Socorro	LINEAR	MAS	1.2 km	MPC · JPL
149367	2002 XT_{59}	—	December 10, 2002	Palomar	NEAT	·	1.8 km	MPC · JPL
149368	2002 XY_{62}	—	December 11, 2002	Socorro	LINEAR	V	1.1 km	MPC · JPL
149369	2002 XU_{65}	—	December 12, 2002	Socorro	LINEAR	PHO	4.0 km	MPC · JPL
149370	2002 XN_{67}	—	December 10, 2002	Socorro	LINEAR	·	1.7 km	MPC · JPL
149371	2002 XR_{69}	—	December 5, 2002	Socorro	LINEAR	MAS	1.3 km	MPC · JPL
149372	2002 XC_{71}	—	December 10, 2002	Socorro	LINEAR	·	2.5 km	MPC · JPL
149373	2002 XW_{80}	—	December 11, 2002	Socorro	LINEAR	·	2.1 km	MPC · JPL
149374	2002 XB_{81}	—	December 11, 2002	Socorro	LINEAR	PHO	5.7 km	MPC · JPL
149375	2002 XK_{81}	—	December 11, 2002	Socorro	LINEAR	·	4.2 km	MPC · JPL
149376	2002 XB_{86}	—	December 11, 2002	Socorro	LINEAR	·	2.1 km	MPC · JPL
149377	2002 XT_{86}	—	December 11, 2002	Socorro	LINEAR	SUL	3.1 km	MPC · JPL
149378	2002 XF_{94}	—	December 3, 2002	Palomar	S. F. Hönig	V	960 m	MPC · JPL
149379	2002 XE_{99}	—	December 5, 2002	Socorro	LINEAR	V	1.0 km	MPC · JPL
149380	2002 YJ_{4}	—	December 28, 2002	Anderson Mesa	LONEOS	·	3.1 km	MPC · JPL
149381	2002 YX_{9}	—	December 31, 2002	Socorro	LINEAR	·	1.9 km	MPC · JPL
149382	2002 YJ_{10}	—	December 31, 2002	Socorro	LINEAR	·	1.8 km	MPC · JPL
149383	2002 YM_{15}	—	December 31, 2002	Socorro	LINEAR	PHO	1.8 km	MPC · JPL
149384	2002 YY_{19}	—	December 31, 2002	Socorro	LINEAR	MAS	1.2 km	MPC · JPL
149385	2002 YS_{23}	—	December 31, 2002	Socorro	LINEAR	V	1.4 km	MPC · JPL
149386	2003 AQ_{1}	—	January 1, 2003	Socorro	LINEAR	HNS	1.9 km	MPC · JPL
149387	2003 AZ_{4}	—	January 1, 2003	Socorro	LINEAR	·	2.3 km	MPC · JPL
149388	2003 AJ_{6}	—	January 1, 2003	Socorro	LINEAR	·	2.3 km	MPC · JPL
149389	2003 AA_{8}	—	January 2, 2003	Anderson Mesa	LONEOS	·	3.6 km	MPC · JPL
149390	2003 AN_{8}	—	January 3, 2003	Kitt Peak	Spacewatch	·	2.1 km	MPC · JPL
149391	2003 AE_{11}	—	January 1, 2003	Socorro	LINEAR	·	2.2 km	MPC · JPL
149392	2003 AS_{14}	—	January 2, 2003	Anderson Mesa	LONEOS	·	2.6 km	MPC · JPL
149393	2003 AY_{23}	—	January 4, 2003	Socorro	LINEAR	PHO	1.6 km	MPC · JPL
149394	2003 AD_{31}	—	January 4, 2003	Socorro	LINEAR	·	2.0 km	MPC · JPL
149395	2003 AM_{37}	—	January 7, 2003	Socorro	LINEAR	·	2.6 km	MPC · JPL
149396	2003 AU_{39}	—	January 7, 2003	Socorro	LINEAR	SUL	3.2 km	MPC · JPL
149397	2003 AM_{41}	—	January 7, 2003	Socorro	LINEAR	·	3.9 km	MPC · JPL
149398	2003 AW_{41}	—	January 7, 2003	Socorro	LINEAR	EUN	2.0 km	MPC · JPL
149399	2003 AQ_{42}	—	January 7, 2003	Haleakala	NEAT	EUN	3.2 km	MPC · JPL
149400	2003 AB_{50}	—	January 5, 2003	Socorro	LINEAR	NYS	2.0 km	MPC · JPL

== 149401–149500 ==
back to top

Designation			Discovery			Properties		Ref
Permanent	Provisional	Named after	Date	Site	Discoverer(s)	Category	Diam.	Ref
149401	2003 AH_{50}	—	January 5, 2003	Socorro	LINEAR	·	2.3 km	MPC · JPL
149402	2003 AE_{53}	—	January 5, 2003	Socorro	LINEAR	NYS	2.0 km	MPC · JPL
149403	2003 AU_{54}	—	January 5, 2003	Anderson Mesa	LONEOS	·	4.0 km	MPC · JPL
149404	2003 AL_{55}	—	January 5, 2003	Socorro	LINEAR	V	1.4 km	MPC · JPL
149405	2003 AD_{57}	—	January 5, 2003	Socorro	LINEAR	·	4.7 km	MPC · JPL
149406	2003 AM_{57}	—	January 5, 2003	Socorro	LINEAR	(5)	1.9 km	MPC · JPL
149407	2003 AO_{58}	—	January 5, 2003	Socorro	LINEAR	·	4.1 km	MPC · JPL
149408	2003 AY_{59}	—	January 5, 2003	Socorro	LINEAR	·	3.3 km	MPC · JPL
149409	2003 AF_{60}	—	January 5, 2003	Socorro	LINEAR	EUN	3.2 km	MPC · JPL
149410	2003 AZ_{61}	—	January 7, 2003	Socorro	LINEAR	(5)	1.9 km	MPC · JPL
149411	2003 AB_{67}	—	January 7, 2003	Socorro	LINEAR	·	2.9 km	MPC · JPL
149412	2003 AA_{74}	—	January 10, 2003	Socorro	LINEAR	·	4.1 km	MPC · JPL
149413	2003 AN_{92}	—	January 8, 2003	Socorro	LINEAR	NYS	2.4 km	MPC · JPL
149414	2003 BH_{1}	—	January 25, 2003	Anderson Mesa	LONEOS	·	2.0 km	MPC · JPL
149415	2003 BM_{8}	—	January 26, 2003	Anderson Mesa	LONEOS	·	2.0 km	MPC · JPL
149416	2003 BM_{11}	—	January 26, 2003	Anderson Mesa	LONEOS	·	2.7 km	MPC · JPL
149417	2003 BU_{11}	—	January 26, 2003	Anderson Mesa	LONEOS	·	2.0 km	MPC · JPL
149418	2003 BD_{14}	—	January 26, 2003	Palomar	NEAT	·	4.7 km	MPC · JPL
149419	2003 BV_{17}	—	January 27, 2003	Socorro	LINEAR	MAS	1.1 km	MPC · JPL
149420	2003 BC_{18}	—	January 27, 2003	Socorro	LINEAR	·	2.0 km	MPC · JPL
149421	2003 BS_{18}	—	January 27, 2003	Palomar	NEAT	·	1.8 km	MPC · JPL
149422	2003 BA_{20}	—	January 26, 2003	Haleakala	NEAT	·	2.8 km	MPC · JPL
149423	2003 BU_{20}	—	January 27, 2003	Haleakala	NEAT	·	2.1 km	MPC · JPL
149424	2003 BT_{22}	—	January 25, 2003	Palomar	NEAT	·	3.5 km	MPC · JPL
149425	2003 BF_{27}	—	January 26, 2003	Anderson Mesa	LONEOS	·	2.7 km	MPC · JPL
149426	2003 BN_{39}	—	January 27, 2003	Socorro	LINEAR	MRX	1.7 km	MPC · JPL
149427	2003 BN_{43}	—	January 27, 2003	Socorro	LINEAR	·	1.7 km	MPC · JPL
149428	2003 BM_{45}	—	January 29, 2003	Palomar	NEAT	KOR	2.2 km	MPC · JPL
149429	2003 BF_{48}	—	January 27, 2003	Anderson Mesa	LONEOS	·	3.5 km	MPC · JPL
149430	2003 BH_{52}	—	January 27, 2003	Socorro	LINEAR	·	2.4 km	MPC · JPL
149431	2003 BK_{52}	—	January 27, 2003	Socorro	LINEAR	·	3.5 km	MPC · JPL
149432	2003 BU_{58}	—	January 27, 2003	Socorro	LINEAR	·	2.4 km	MPC · JPL
149433	2003 BL_{66}	—	January 30, 2003	Anderson Mesa	LONEOS	EUN	2.4 km	MPC · JPL
149434	2003 BM_{70}	—	January 30, 2003	Kitt Peak	Spacewatch	·	3.2 km	MPC · JPL
149435	2003 BU_{72}	—	January 28, 2003	Palomar	NEAT	JUN	2.0 km	MPC · JPL
149436	2003 BL_{74}	—	January 29, 2003	Palomar	NEAT	·	2.1 km	MPC · JPL
149437	2003 BW_{76}	—	January 29, 2003	Palomar	NEAT	·	4.9 km	MPC · JPL
149438	2003 BV_{77}	—	January 30, 2003	Anderson Mesa	LONEOS	·	3.5 km	MPC · JPL
149439	2003 BW_{81}	—	January 31, 2003	Socorro	LINEAR	·	4.8 km	MPC · JPL
149440	2003 BD_{82}	—	January 30, 2003	Anderson Mesa	LONEOS	MAR	2.8 km	MPC · JPL
149441	2003 BO_{87}	—	January 26, 2003	Anderson Mesa	LONEOS	·	2.6 km	MPC · JPL
149442	2003 BE_{89}	—	January 28, 2003	Kitt Peak	Spacewatch	(5)	1.8 km	MPC · JPL
149443	2003 BZ_{89}	—	January 28, 2003	Socorro	LINEAR	EUN	1.9 km	MPC · JPL
149444	2003 CP_{2}	—	February 2, 2003	Socorro	LINEAR	PHO	2.4 km	MPC · JPL
149445	2003 CQ_{5}	—	February 1, 2003	Socorro	LINEAR	·	3.1 km	MPC · JPL
149446	2003 CC_{6}	—	February 1, 2003	Socorro	LINEAR	·	3.5 km	MPC · JPL
149447	2003 CR_{7}	—	February 1, 2003	Socorro	LINEAR	·	4.2 km	MPC · JPL
149448	2003 CJ_{9}	—	February 2, 2003	Socorro	LINEAR	·	2.0 km	MPC · JPL
149449	2003 CE_{10}	—	February 2, 2003	Haleakala	NEAT	·	6.0 km	MPC · JPL
149450	2003 CE_{14}	—	February 6, 2003	Wrightwood	J. W. Young	·	1.9 km	MPC · JPL
149451	2003 CF_{14}	—	February 4, 2003	Haleakala	NEAT	·	2.8 km	MPC · JPL
149452	2003 CM_{17}	—	February 8, 2003	Haleakala	NEAT	·	3.0 km	MPC · JPL
149453	2003 CW_{21}	—	February 3, 2003	Socorro	LINEAR	·	1.4 km	MPC · JPL
149454	2003 DC	—	February 19, 2003	Palomar	NEAT	·	4.7 km	MPC · JPL
149455	2003 DX_{11}	—	February 25, 2003	Campo Imperatore	CINEOS	·	3.4 km	MPC · JPL
149456	2003 DA_{13}	—	February 26, 2003	Campo Imperatore	CINEOS	AGN	2.3 km	MPC · JPL
149457	2003 DS_{13}	—	February 25, 2003	Haleakala	NEAT	·	3.7 km	MPC · JPL
149458	2003 DM_{15}	—	February 26, 2003	Haleakala	NEAT	·	2.0 km	MPC · JPL
149459	2003 DC_{20}	—	February 22, 2003	Palomar	NEAT	slow	3.1 km	MPC · JPL
149460	2003 DY_{20}	—	February 22, 2003	Palomar	NEAT	NYS	1.8 km	MPC · JPL
149461	2003 DQ_{21}	—	February 23, 2003	Anderson Mesa	LONEOS	EUN	1.9 km	MPC · JPL
149462	2003 DO_{24}	—	February 22, 2003	Palomar	NEAT	MAR	1.6 km	MPC · JPL
149463	2003 EV_{4}	—	March 6, 2003	Socorro	LINEAR	·	3.9 km	MPC · JPL
149464	2003 EP_{7}	—	March 6, 2003	Anderson Mesa	LONEOS	EUN	2.4 km	MPC · JPL
149465	2003 EC_{8}	—	March 6, 2003	Anderson Mesa	LONEOS	(1118)	5.1 km	MPC · JPL
149466	2003 EP_{8}	—	March 6, 2003	Anderson Mesa	LONEOS	·	1.9 km	MPC · JPL
149467	2003 EV_{8}	—	March 6, 2003	Socorro	LINEAR	·	3.0 km	MPC · JPL
149468	2003 EO_{10}	—	March 6, 2003	Socorro	LINEAR	·	1.8 km	MPC · JPL
149469	2003 EL_{12}	—	March 6, 2003	Socorro	LINEAR	·	2.2 km	MPC · JPL
149470	2003 EU_{12}	—	March 6, 2003	Socorro	LINEAR	EUN	1.7 km	MPC · JPL
149471	2003 EF_{13}	—	March 6, 2003	Palomar	NEAT	·	2.7 km	MPC · JPL
149472	2003 EA_{14}	—	March 6, 2003	Palomar	NEAT	·	1.9 km	MPC · JPL
149473	2003 EO_{15}	—	March 7, 2003	Socorro	LINEAR	·	3.4 km	MPC · JPL
149474	2003 EA_{20}	—	March 6, 2003	Anderson Mesa	LONEOS	·	3.9 km	MPC · JPL
149475	2003 EX_{21}	—	March 6, 2003	Socorro	LINEAR	·	4.4 km	MPC · JPL
149476	2003 EK_{23}	—	March 6, 2003	Socorro	LINEAR	·	3.2 km	MPC · JPL
149477	2003 EL_{24}	—	March 6, 2003	Socorro	LINEAR	·	2.8 km	MPC · JPL
149478	2003 EQ_{24}	—	March 6, 2003	Socorro	LINEAR	·	2.6 km	MPC · JPL
149479	2003 ER_{25}	—	March 6, 2003	Anderson Mesa	LONEOS	·	2.1 km	MPC · JPL
149480	2003 EG_{29}	—	March 6, 2003	Socorro	LINEAR	·	3.1 km	MPC · JPL
149481	2003 EC_{35}	—	March 7, 2003	Socorro	LINEAR	(5)	2.1 km	MPC · JPL
149482	2003 EA_{36}	—	March 7, 2003	Anderson Mesa	LONEOS	·	3.6 km	MPC · JPL
149483	2003 EN_{36}	—	March 7, 2003	Anderson Mesa	LONEOS	·	2.4 km	MPC · JPL
149484	2003 EP_{36}	—	March 7, 2003	Anderson Mesa	LONEOS	·	2.4 km	MPC · JPL
149485	2003 EB_{37}	—	March 8, 2003	Anderson Mesa	LONEOS	·	4.3 km	MPC · JPL
149486	2003 EM_{37}	—	March 8, 2003	Anderson Mesa	LONEOS	·	2.9 km	MPC · JPL
149487	2003 EU_{37}	—	March 8, 2003	Anderson Mesa	LONEOS	·	5.1 km	MPC · JPL
149488	2003 EJ_{38}	—	March 8, 2003	Anderson Mesa	LONEOS	HNS	2.1 km	MPC · JPL
149489	2003 EG_{45}	—	March 7, 2003	Socorro	LINEAR	·	3.3 km	MPC · JPL
149490	2003 EB_{47}	—	March 8, 2003	Anderson Mesa	LONEOS	·	4.0 km	MPC · JPL
149491	2003 EC_{48}	—	March 9, 2003	Anderson Mesa	LONEOS	·	2.7 km	MPC · JPL
149492	2003 EK_{48}	—	March 9, 2003	Socorro	LINEAR	·	3.1 km	MPC · JPL
149493	2003 EK_{49}	—	March 10, 2003	Anderson Mesa	LONEOS	·	3.4 km	MPC · JPL
149494	2003 ET_{49}	—	March 10, 2003	Palomar	NEAT	HNS	1.8 km	MPC · JPL
149495	2003 EE_{58}	—	March 9, 2003	Palomar	NEAT	EUN	4.5 km	MPC · JPL
149496	2003 EJ_{60}	—	March 9, 2003	Socorro	LINEAR	JUN	1.7 km	MPC · JPL
149497	2003 FJ_{9}	—	March 23, 2003	Kitt Peak	Spacewatch	HOF	4.3 km	MPC · JPL
149498	2003 FZ_{11}	—	March 23, 2003	Kitt Peak	Spacewatch	·	2.8 km	MPC · JPL
149499	2003 FP_{16}	—	March 23, 2003	Haleakala	NEAT	·	4.4 km	MPC · JPL
149500	2003 FP_{17}	—	March 24, 2003	Kitt Peak	Spacewatch	·	3.2 km	MPC · JPL

== 149501–149600 ==
back to top

Designation			Discovery			Properties		Ref
Permanent	Provisional	Named after	Date	Site	Discoverer(s)	Category	Diam.	Ref
149501	2003 FV_{34}	—	March 23, 2003	Kitt Peak	Spacewatch	(11882)	2.6 km	MPC · JPL
149502	2003 FP_{35}	—	March 23, 2003	Kitt Peak	Spacewatch	·	3.4 km	MPC · JPL
149503	2003 FP_{39}	—	March 24, 2003	Kitt Peak	Spacewatch	KOR	1.9 km	MPC · JPL
149504	2003 FQ_{46}	—	March 24, 2003	Kitt Peak	Spacewatch	·	4.9 km	MPC · JPL
149505	2003 FS_{49}	—	March 24, 2003	Haleakala	NEAT	·	2.3 km	MPC · JPL
149506	2003 FF_{55}	—	March 26, 2003	Palomar	NEAT	MIS	4.0 km	MPC · JPL
149507	2003 FC_{57}	—	March 26, 2003	Palomar	NEAT	·	2.3 km	MPC · JPL
149508	2003 FN_{57}	—	March 26, 2003	Kitt Peak	Spacewatch	·	3.6 km	MPC · JPL
149509	2003 FH_{59}	—	March 26, 2003	Palomar	NEAT	·	2.9 km	MPC · JPL
149510	2003 FB_{68}	—	March 26, 2003	Palomar	NEAT	·	3.1 km	MPC · JPL
149511	2003 FC_{68}	—	March 26, 2003	Palomar	NEAT	·	2.8 km	MPC · JPL
149512	2003 FK_{69}	—	March 26, 2003	Palomar	NEAT	PAD	2.9 km	MPC · JPL
149513	2003 FB_{71}	—	March 26, 2003	Kitt Peak	Spacewatch	AGN	2.0 km	MPC · JPL
149514	2003 FJ_{71}	—	March 26, 2003	Kitt Peak	Spacewatch	·	4.2 km	MPC · JPL
149515	2003 FA_{72}	—	March 26, 2003	Haleakala	NEAT	·	4.2 km	MPC · JPL
149516	2003 FS_{73}	—	March 26, 2003	Palomar	NEAT	·	4.4 km	MPC · JPL
149517	2003 FF_{74}	—	March 26, 2003	Haleakala	NEAT	·	4.8 km	MPC · JPL
149518	2003 FC_{82}	—	March 27, 2003	Kitt Peak	Spacewatch	·	2.7 km	MPC · JPL
149519	2003 FA_{91}	—	March 29, 2003	Anderson Mesa	LONEOS	·	4.4 km	MPC · JPL
149520	2003 FJ_{93}	—	March 29, 2003	Anderson Mesa	LONEOS	(5)	2.0 km	MPC · JPL
149521	2003 FS_{93}	—	March 29, 2003	Anderson Mesa	LONEOS	·	4.4 km	MPC · JPL
149522	2003 FT_{97}	—	March 30, 2003	Anderson Mesa	LONEOS	·	3.8 km	MPC · JPL
149523	2003 FM_{106}	—	March 26, 2003	Kitt Peak	Spacewatch	·	4.1 km	MPC · JPL
149524	2003 FH_{107}	—	March 30, 2003	Socorro	LINEAR	·	3.1 km	MPC · JPL
149525	2003 FB_{111}	—	March 31, 2003	Socorro	LINEAR	EUN	2.4 km	MPC · JPL
149526	2003 FE_{113}	—	March 31, 2003	Kitt Peak	Spacewatch	MRX	1.4 km	MPC · JPL
149527	2003 FK_{117}	—	March 25, 2003	Palomar	NEAT	AGN	2.1 km	MPC · JPL
149528 Simónrodríguez	2003 FD_{129}	Simónrodríguez	March 24, 2003	Mérida	Ferrin, I. R., Leal, C.	TIR	4.4 km	MPC · JPL
149529	2003 GR_{4}	—	April 1, 2003	Socorro	LINEAR	·	2.0 km	MPC · JPL
149530	2003 GC_{6}	—	April 1, 2003	Socorro	LINEAR	·	4.3 km	MPC · JPL
149531	2003 GO_{11}	—	April 1, 2003	Kitt Peak	Spacewatch	·	3.2 km	MPC · JPL
149532	2003 GS_{14}	—	April 2, 2003	Haleakala	NEAT	·	3.0 km	MPC · JPL
149533	2003 GK_{16}	—	April 2, 2003	Haleakala	NEAT	·	2.8 km	MPC · JPL
149534	2003 GG_{23}	—	April 4, 2003	Anderson Mesa	LONEOS	CLO	2.9 km	MPC · JPL
149535	2003 GS_{29}	—	April 7, 2003	Kitt Peak	Spacewatch	·	3.0 km	MPC · JPL
149536	2003 GV_{41}	—	April 6, 2003	Anderson Mesa	LONEOS	CYB	7.5 km	MPC · JPL
149537	2003 GE_{42}	—	April 9, 2003	Socorro	LINEAR	·	5.0 km	MPC · JPL
149538	2003 GJ_{49}	—	April 8, 2003	Socorro	LINEAR	DOR	3.6 km	MPC · JPL
149539	2003 GS_{50}	—	April 8, 2003	Haleakala	NEAT	·	3.2 km	MPC · JPL
149540	2003 GY_{50}	—	April 8, 2003	Haleakala	NEAT	·	3.5 km	MPC · JPL
149541	2003 HX_{7}	—	April 24, 2003	Anderson Mesa	LONEOS	·	3.1 km	MPC · JPL
149542	2003 HO_{33}	—	April 26, 2003	Kitt Peak	Spacewatch	EOS	2.6 km	MPC · JPL
149543	2003 HM_{47}	—	April 29, 2003	Kitt Peak	Spacewatch	·	3.8 km	MPC · JPL
149544	2003 HY_{50}	—	April 28, 2003	Kitt Peak	Spacewatch	·	9.1 km	MPC · JPL
149545	2003 HE_{52}	—	April 30, 2003	Kitt Peak	Spacewatch	EOS	3.3 km	MPC · JPL
149546	2003 JP_{4}	—	May 1, 2003	Socorro	LINEAR	·	3.0 km	MPC · JPL
149547	2003 JG_{7}	—	May 2, 2003	Socorro	LINEAR	·	4.0 km	MPC · JPL
149548	2003 KY	—	May 20, 2003	Haleakala	NEAT	·	7.3 km	MPC · JPL
149549	2003 KP_{1}	—	May 22, 2003	Kitt Peak	Spacewatch	EOS	2.7 km	MPC · JPL
149550	2003 KH_{2}	—	May 22, 2003	Kitt Peak	Spacewatch	·	4.5 km	MPC · JPL
149551	2003 KO_{7}	—	May 25, 2003	Anderson Mesa	LONEOS	GEF	2.2 km	MPC · JPL
149552	2003 KL_{15}	—	May 26, 2003	Kitt Peak	Spacewatch	·	2.4 km	MPC · JPL
149553	2003 KT_{15}	—	May 27, 2003	Kitt Peak	Spacewatch	THM	3.2 km	MPC · JPL
149554	2003 KF_{28}	—	May 22, 2003	Kitt Peak	Spacewatch	·	2.8 km	MPC · JPL
149555	2003 KN_{31}	—	May 26, 2003	Kitt Peak	Spacewatch	·	4.0 km	MPC · JPL
149556	2003 LJ_{2}	—	June 2, 2003	Kitt Peak	Spacewatch	·	2.5 km	MPC · JPL
149557	2003 LW_{5}	—	June 4, 2003	Reedy Creek	J. Broughton	·	2.9 km	MPC · JPL
149558	2003 NJ_{9}	—	July 1, 2003	Socorro	LINEAR	·	5.8 km	MPC · JPL
149559	2003 OG_{1}	—	July 22, 2003	Campo Imperatore	CINEOS	TIR	6.6 km	MPC · JPL
149560	2003 QZ_{91}	—	August 24, 2003	Cerro Tololo	M. W. Buie	centaur	158 km	MPC · JPL
149561	2003 SJ_{219}	—	September 28, 2003	Socorro	LINEAR	H	1.1 km	MPC · JPL
149562	2003 US_{13}	—	October 21, 2003	Kitt Peak	Spacewatch	H	800 m	MPC · JPL
149563	2003 VF_{9}	—	November 15, 2003	Kitt Peak	Spacewatch	H	1.4 km	MPC · JPL
149564	2003 WK_{7}	—	November 18, 2003	Socorro	LINEAR	H	1.1 km	MPC · JPL
149565	2003 WH_{47}	—	November 18, 2003	Kitt Peak	Spacewatch	·	820 m	MPC · JPL
149566	2003 WC_{122}	—	November 20, 2003	Socorro	LINEAR	·	1.2 km	MPC · JPL
149567	2003 XG_{11}	—	December 11, 2003	Socorro	LINEAR	H	1.1 km	MPC · JPL
149568	2003 YG_{4}	—	December 16, 2003	Kitt Peak	Spacewatch	·	1.2 km	MPC · JPL
149569	2003 YJ_{47}	—	December 17, 2003	Kitt Peak	Spacewatch	·	2.2 km	MPC · JPL
149570	2003 YW_{51}	—	December 18, 2003	Socorro	LINEAR	·	2.1 km	MPC · JPL
149571	2003 YJ_{52}	—	December 18, 2003	Palomar	NEAT	·	3.2 km	MPC · JPL
149572	2003 YY_{92}	—	December 21, 2003	Socorro	LINEAR	·	1.2 km	MPC · JPL
149573 Mamorudoi	2003 YK_{180}	Mamorudoi	December 21, 2003	Apache Point	SDSS	·	1.2 km	MPC · JPL
149574	2004 BU_{30}	—	January 18, 2004	Palomar	NEAT	·	2.2 km	MPC · JPL
149575	2004 BA_{37}	—	January 19, 2004	Kitt Peak	Spacewatch	·	2.0 km	MPC · JPL
149576	2004 BA_{43}	—	January 22, 2004	Palomar	NEAT	·	1.8 km	MPC · JPL
149577	2004 BH_{44}	—	January 22, 2004	Socorro	LINEAR	·	1.7 km	MPC · JPL
149578	2004 BJ_{56}	—	January 23, 2004	Anderson Mesa	LONEOS	NYS	1.7 km	MPC · JPL
149579	2004 BT_{79}	—	January 23, 2004	Socorro	LINEAR	·	2.6 km	MPC · JPL
149580	2004 BQ_{97}	—	January 26, 2004	Anderson Mesa	LONEOS	·	1.4 km	MPC · JPL
149581	2004 BF_{99}	—	January 27, 2004	Kitt Peak	Spacewatch	·	1.3 km	MPC · JPL
149582	2004 BX_{104}	—	January 24, 2004	Socorro	LINEAR	NYS	1.5 km	MPC · JPL
149583	2004 BK_{105}	—	January 24, 2004	Socorro	LINEAR	NYS	1.4 km	MPC · JPL
149584	2004 BD_{108}	—	January 28, 2004	Catalina	CSS	·	1.6 km	MPC · JPL
149585	2004 BV_{115}	—	January 24, 2004	Socorro	LINEAR	·	1.1 km	MPC · JPL
149586	2004 CZ_{17}	—	February 10, 2004	Catalina	CSS	·	1.5 km	MPC · JPL
149587	2004 CY_{18}	—	February 11, 2004	Kitt Peak	Spacewatch	EUN	1.9 km	MPC · JPL
149588	2004 CC_{29}	—	February 12, 2004	Kitt Peak	Spacewatch	·	1.7 km	MPC · JPL
149589	2004 CN_{35}	—	February 11, 2004	Kitt Peak	Spacewatch	·	1.3 km	MPC · JPL
149590	2004 CO_{36}	—	February 12, 2004	Desert Eagle	W. K. Y. Yeung	·	1.9 km	MPC · JPL
149591	2004 CL_{51}	—	February 13, 2004	Desert Eagle	W. K. Y. Yeung	V	1.2 km	MPC · JPL
149592	2004 CU_{51}	—	February 11, 2004	Palomar	NEAT	·	1.8 km	MPC · JPL
149593	2004 CL_{69}	—	February 11, 2004	Palomar	NEAT	·	1.3 km	MPC · JPL
149594	2004 CR_{80}	—	February 11, 2004	Palomar	NEAT	(5)	3.4 km	MPC · JPL
149595	2004 CM_{85}	—	February 14, 2004	Kitt Peak	Spacewatch	NYS	2.1 km	MPC · JPL
149596	2004 CC_{96}	—	February 14, 2004	Kitt Peak	Spacewatch	·	2.5 km	MPC · JPL
149597	2004 CH_{103}	—	February 12, 2004	Palomar	NEAT	·	1.2 km	MPC · JPL
149598	2004 CP_{110}	—	February 13, 2004	Kitt Peak	Spacewatch	·	1.0 km	MPC · JPL
149599	2004 CT_{128}	—	February 14, 2004	Kitt Peak	Spacewatch	·	2.5 km	MPC · JPL
149600	2004 DH_{12}	—	February 17, 2004	Haleakala	NEAT	·	1.5 km	MPC · JPL

== 149601–149700 ==
back to top

Designation			Discovery			Properties		Ref
Permanent	Provisional	Named after	Date	Site	Discoverer(s)	Category	Diam.	Ref
149601	2004 DJ_{13}	—	February 16, 2004	Catalina	CSS	·	1.7 km	MPC · JPL
149602	2004 DS_{15}	—	February 17, 2004	Socorro	LINEAR	·	1.9 km	MPC · JPL
149603	2004 DG_{16}	—	February 17, 2004	Kitt Peak	Spacewatch	V	1.2 km	MPC · JPL
149604	2004 DS_{20}	—	February 17, 2004	Catalina	CSS	·	2.7 km	MPC · JPL
149605	2004 DO_{23}	—	February 18, 2004	Catalina	CSS	·	1.3 km	MPC · JPL
149606	2004 DQ_{28}	—	February 17, 2004	Kitt Peak	Spacewatch	(18466)	3.3 km	MPC · JPL
149607	2004 DJ_{38}	—	February 19, 2004	Haleakala	NEAT	·	2.8 km	MPC · JPL
149608	2004 DK_{45}	—	February 25, 2004	Goodricke-Pigott	Goodricke-Pigott	JUN	2.6 km	MPC · JPL
149609	2004 DK_{49}	—	February 19, 2004	Socorro	LINEAR	·	1.8 km	MPC · JPL
149610	2004 DT_{61}	—	February 26, 2004	Socorro	LINEAR	NYS	1.6 km	MPC · JPL
149611	2004 DK_{77}	—	February 29, 2004	Kitt Peak	Spacewatch	·	1.0 km	MPC · JPL
149612	2004 EO_{7}	—	March 12, 2004	Palomar	NEAT	NYS · slow	2.0 km	MPC · JPL
149613	2004 EL_{8}	—	March 13, 2004	Palomar	NEAT	·	3.7 km	MPC · JPL
149614	2004 EP_{11}	—	March 10, 2004	Palomar	NEAT	·	2.0 km	MPC · JPL
149615	2004 EX_{11}	—	March 11, 2004	Palomar	NEAT	·	1.1 km	MPC · JPL
149616	2004 EN_{13}	—	March 11, 2004	Palomar	NEAT	·	1.6 km	MPC · JPL
149617	2004 EK_{16}	—	March 12, 2004	Palomar	NEAT	·	1.4 km	MPC · JPL
149618	2004 EJ_{20}	—	March 15, 2004	Socorro	LINEAR	·	1.2 km	MPC · JPL
149619	2004 EY_{21}	—	March 15, 2004	Desert Eagle	W. K. Y. Yeung	·	1.6 km	MPC · JPL
149620	2004 EM_{27}	—	March 15, 2004	Kitt Peak	Spacewatch	·	910 m	MPC · JPL
149621	2004 EJ_{32}	—	March 15, 2004	Catalina	CSS	·	1.1 km	MPC · JPL
149622	2004 EP_{33}	—	March 15, 2004	Socorro	LINEAR	·	1.2 km	MPC · JPL
149623	2004 EU_{36}	—	March 13, 2004	Palomar	NEAT	·	1.5 km	MPC · JPL
149624	2004 EC_{37}	—	March 13, 2004	Palomar	NEAT	·	1.3 km	MPC · JPL
149625	2004 EK_{41}	—	March 15, 2004	Kitt Peak	Spacewatch	·	1.3 km	MPC · JPL
149626	2004 EG_{43}	—	March 15, 2004	Catalina	CSS	·	3.6 km	MPC · JPL
149627	2004 ES_{51}	—	March 15, 2004	Socorro	LINEAR	HNS	1.9 km	MPC · JPL
149628	2004 EC_{56}	—	March 14, 2004	Palomar	NEAT	·	1.3 km	MPC · JPL
149629	2004 EQ_{56}	—	March 14, 2004	Palomar	NEAT	·	1.4 km	MPC · JPL
149630	2004 ET_{59}	—	March 15, 2004	Palomar	NEAT	·	1.6 km	MPC · JPL
149631	2004 EO_{60}	—	March 11, 2004	Palomar	NEAT	·	1.3 km	MPC · JPL
149632	2004 EM_{62}	—	March 12, 2004	Palomar	NEAT	·	1.3 km	MPC · JPL
149633	2004 EX_{65}	—	March 14, 2004	Kitt Peak	Spacewatch	·	1.2 km	MPC · JPL
149634	2004 EU_{72}	—	March 15, 2004	Socorro	LINEAR	·	1.0 km	MPC · JPL
149635	2004 EH_{73}	—	March 15, 2004	Catalina	CSS	(5)	1.8 km	MPC · JPL
149636	2004 EC_{78}	—	March 15, 2004	Catalina	CSS	·	2.5 km	MPC · JPL
149637	2004 EE_{79}	—	March 15, 2004	Catalina	CSS	·	1.4 km	MPC · JPL
149638	2004 EU_{79}	—	March 12, 2004	Palomar	NEAT	·	2.0 km	MPC · JPL
149639	2004 FU_{2}	—	March 18, 2004	Socorro	LINEAR	·	1.3 km	MPC · JPL
149640	2004 FX_{9}	—	March 16, 2004	Campo Imperatore	CINEOS	·	1.6 km	MPC · JPL
149641	2004 FE_{15}	—	March 16, 2004	Kitt Peak	Spacewatch	·	1.1 km	MPC · JPL
149642	2004 FB_{22}	—	March 16, 2004	Socorro	LINEAR	·	1.5 km	MPC · JPL
149643	2004 FJ_{23}	—	March 17, 2004	Kitt Peak	Spacewatch	·	3.0 km	MPC · JPL
149644	2004 FF_{27}	—	March 17, 2004	Kitt Peak	Spacewatch	THM	4.7 km	MPC · JPL
149645	2004 FK_{32}	—	March 27, 2004	Socorro	LINEAR	·	2.2 km	MPC · JPL
149646	2004 FX_{34}	—	March 16, 2004	Kitt Peak	Spacewatch	·	1.6 km	MPC · JPL
149647	2004 FC_{38}	—	March 17, 2004	Catalina	CSS	·	1.3 km	MPC · JPL
149648	2004 FH_{38}	—	March 17, 2004	Socorro	LINEAR	V	1.3 km	MPC · JPL
149649	2004 FR_{43}	—	March 19, 2004	Socorro	LINEAR	fast	1.9 km	MPC · JPL
149650	2004 FW_{44}	—	March 16, 2004	Socorro	LINEAR	·	1.4 km	MPC · JPL
149651	2004 FC_{53}	—	March 19, 2004	Socorro	LINEAR	·	1.4 km	MPC · JPL
149652	2004 FW_{53}	—	March 17, 2004	Kitt Peak	Spacewatch	NYS	1.3 km	MPC · JPL
149653	2004 FF_{56}	—	March 16, 2004	Socorro	LINEAR	·	1.5 km	MPC · JPL
149654	2004 FO_{60}	—	March 18, 2004	Socorro	LINEAR	NYS	1.6 km	MPC · JPL
149655	2004 FM_{64}	—	March 19, 2004	Socorro	LINEAR	·	1.3 km	MPC · JPL
149656	2004 FP_{64}	—	March 19, 2004	Socorro	LINEAR	NYS	1.6 km	MPC · JPL
149657	2004 FH_{86}	—	March 19, 2004	Palomar	NEAT	·	810 m	MPC · JPL
149658	2004 FO_{91}	—	March 22, 2004	Socorro	LINEAR	·	890 m	MPC · JPL
149659	2004 FR_{92}	—	March 18, 2004	Socorro	LINEAR	MAS	1.1 km	MPC · JPL
149660	2004 FC_{93}	—	March 19, 2004	Socorro	LINEAR	·	1.3 km	MPC · JPL
149661	2004 FP_{104}	—	March 23, 2004	Socorro	LINEAR	·	1.3 km	MPC · JPL
149662	2004 FW_{105}	—	March 25, 2004	Socorro	LINEAR	ADE	3.5 km	MPC · JPL
149663	2004 FR_{106}	—	March 20, 2004	Socorro	LINEAR	·	1.6 km	MPC · JPL
149664	2004 FA_{109}	—	March 23, 2004	Kitt Peak	Spacewatch	·	2.6 km	MPC · JPL
149665	2004 FD_{122}	—	March 25, 2004	Anderson Mesa	LONEOS	NYS	2.8 km	MPC · JPL
149666	2004 FJ_{126}	—	March 27, 2004	Socorro	LINEAR	V	1.3 km	MPC · JPL
149667	2004 FF_{130}	—	March 22, 2004	Anderson Mesa	LONEOS	EUN	1.9 km	MPC · JPL
149668	2004 FV_{136}	—	March 28, 2004	Socorro	LINEAR	·	4.3 km	MPC · JPL
149669	2004 FM_{141}	—	March 27, 2004	Socorro	LINEAR	THM	3.3 km	MPC · JPL
149670	2004 FJ_{142}	—	March 27, 2004	Socorro	LINEAR	·	1.6 km	MPC · JPL
149671	2004 FD_{143}	—	March 27, 2004	Anderson Mesa	LONEOS	(2076)	1.4 km	MPC · JPL
149672	2004 FH_{145}	—	March 30, 2004	Kitt Peak	Spacewatch	·	1.6 km	MPC · JPL
149673	2004 GE_{9}	—	April 12, 2004	Anderson Mesa	LONEOS	NYS	1.4 km	MPC · JPL
149674	2004 GN_{11}	—	April 11, 2004	Catalina	CSS	BAR	2.6 km	MPC · JPL
149675	2004 GS_{12}	—	April 11, 2004	Palomar	NEAT	V	990 m	MPC · JPL
149676	2004 GG_{13}	—	April 12, 2004	Anderson Mesa	LONEOS	·	5.0 km	MPC · JPL
149677	2004 GL_{15}	—	April 14, 2004	Socorro	LINEAR	PHO	1.7 km	MPC · JPL
149678	2004 GZ_{17}	—	April 12, 2004	Catalina	CSS	·	5.1 km	MPC · JPL
149679	2004 GA_{18}	—	April 12, 2004	Catalina	CSS	·	3.5 km	MPC · JPL
149680	2004 GK_{21}	—	April 11, 2004	Palomar	NEAT	LUT	5.5 km	MPC · JPL
149681	2004 GU_{24}	—	April 13, 2004	Kitt Peak	Spacewatch	·	5.2 km	MPC · JPL
149682	2004 GD_{29}	—	April 11, 2004	Catalina	CSS	·	2.2 km	MPC · JPL
149683	2004 GM_{30}	—	April 12, 2004	Kitt Peak	Spacewatch	·	1.4 km	MPC · JPL
149684	2004 GC_{34}	—	April 12, 2004	Palomar	NEAT	(5)	2.5 km	MPC · JPL
149685	2004 GM_{34}	—	April 13, 2004	Palomar	NEAT	·	4.5 km	MPC · JPL
149686	2004 GB_{35}	—	April 13, 2004	Palomar	NEAT	V	1.2 km	MPC · JPL
149687	2004 GV_{65}	—	April 13, 2004	Kitt Peak	Spacewatch	·	1.3 km	MPC · JPL
149688	2004 GU_{71}	—	April 14, 2004	Kitt Peak	Spacewatch	V	1.1 km	MPC · JPL
149689	2004 GG_{72}	—	April 14, 2004	Kitt Peak	Spacewatch	HYG	5.6 km	MPC · JPL
149690	2004 GZ_{86}	—	April 14, 2004	Palomar	NEAT	·	1.3 km	MPC · JPL
149691	2004 HN	—	April 18, 2004	Pla D'Arguines	R. Ferrando	·	1.1 km	MPC · JPL
149692	2004 HM_{2}	—	April 16, 2004	Socorro	LINEAR	slow	3.2 km	MPC · JPL
149693	2004 HP_{6}	—	April 17, 2004	Anderson Mesa	LONEOS	·	1.9 km	MPC · JPL
149694	2004 HY_{15}	—	April 16, 2004	Socorro	LINEAR	·	2.2 km	MPC · JPL
149695	2004 HW_{21}	—	April 16, 2004	Kitt Peak	Spacewatch	·	5.5 km	MPC · JPL
149696	2004 HP_{25}	—	April 19, 2004	Kitt Peak	Spacewatch	·	7.2 km	MPC · JPL
149697	2004 HR_{25}	—	April 19, 2004	Socorro	LINEAR	NYS	1.7 km	MPC · JPL
149698	2004 HJ_{38}	—	April 23, 2004	Socorro	LINEAR	·	2.1 km	MPC · JPL
149699	2004 HN_{41}	—	April 20, 2004	Kitt Peak	Spacewatch	·	1.4 km	MPC · JPL
149700	2004 HL_{42}	—	April 20, 2004	Socorro	LINEAR	·	1.1 km	MPC · JPL

== 149701–149800 ==
back to top

Designation			Discovery			Properties		Ref
Permanent	Provisional	Named after	Date	Site	Discoverer(s)	Category	Diam.	Ref
149701	2004 HD_{43}	—	April 20, 2004	Socorro	LINEAR	V	1.1 km	MPC · JPL
149702	2004 HF_{50}	—	April 23, 2004	Socorro	LINEAR	·	2.2 km	MPC · JPL
149703	2004 HS_{52}	—	April 24, 2004	Kitt Peak	Spacewatch	·	1.2 km	MPC · JPL
149704	2004 HR_{53}	—	April 25, 2004	Haleakala	NEAT	·	4.0 km	MPC · JPL
149705	2004 HC_{56}	—	April 24, 2004	Siding Spring	SSS	·	3.0 km	MPC · JPL
149706	2004 HY_{56}	—	April 27, 2004	Socorro	LINEAR	(194)	2.7 km	MPC · JPL
149707	2004 HA_{63}	—	April 30, 2004	Kitt Peak	Spacewatch	·	5.1 km	MPC · JPL
149708	2004 HB_{65}	—	April 16, 2004	Palomar	NEAT	·	5.6 km	MPC · JPL
149709	2004 JM_{6}	—	May 9, 2004	Palomar	NEAT	·	1.9 km	MPC · JPL
149710	2004 JG_{8}	—	May 11, 2004	Anderson Mesa	LONEOS	·	7.0 km	MPC · JPL
149711	2004 JD_{10}	—	May 10, 2004	Catalina	CSS	·	2.3 km	MPC · JPL
149712	2004 JF_{10}	—	May 10, 2004	Palomar	NEAT	·	4.9 km	MPC · JPL
149713	2004 JK_{10}	—	May 10, 2004	Palomar	NEAT	MAR	2.0 km	MPC · JPL
149714	2004 JZ_{14}	—	May 9, 2004	Haleakala	NEAT	V	1.1 km	MPC · JPL
149715	2004 JT_{15}	—	May 10, 2004	Catalina	CSS	·	2.1 km	MPC · JPL
149716	2004 JQ_{18}	—	May 13, 2004	Kitt Peak	Spacewatch	·	1.6 km	MPC · JPL
149717	2004 JP_{19}	—	May 13, 2004	Palomar	NEAT	MAS	930 m	MPC · JPL
149718	2004 JF_{20}	—	May 14, 2004	Catalina	CSS	·	1.1 km	MPC · JPL
149719	2004 JS_{22}	—	May 10, 2004	Palomar	NEAT	·	1.9 km	MPC · JPL
149720	2004 JH_{27}	—	May 15, 2004	Socorro	LINEAR	·	2.0 km	MPC · JPL
149721	2004 JZ_{29}	—	May 15, 2004	Socorro	LINEAR	·	1.8 km	MPC · JPL
149722	2004 JB_{30}	—	May 15, 2004	Socorro	LINEAR	·	2.3 km	MPC · JPL
149723	2004 JJ_{30}	—	May 15, 2004	Socorro	LINEAR	·	1.7 km	MPC · JPL
149724	2004 JK_{32}	—	May 14, 2004	Campo Imperatore	CINEOS	·	1.7 km	MPC · JPL
149725	2004 JO_{34}	—	May 15, 2004	Socorro	LINEAR	V	1.2 km	MPC · JPL
149726	2004 JN_{35}	—	May 15, 2004	Socorro	LINEAR	·	4.7 km	MPC · JPL
149727	2004 JO_{54}	—	May 9, 2004	Kitt Peak	Spacewatch	(2076)	1.3 km	MPC · JPL
149728 Klostermann	2004 KR_{1}	Klostermann	May 19, 2004	Kleť	KLENOT	·	2.7 km	MPC · JPL
149729	2004 KA_{4}	—	May 16, 2004	Socorro	LINEAR	EOS · fast	3.5 km	MPC · JPL
149730	2004 KG_{5}	—	May 16, 2004	Reedy Creek	J. Broughton	·	2.0 km	MPC · JPL
149731	2004 KH_{13}	—	May 19, 2004	Kitt Peak	Spacewatch	·	2.2 km	MPC · JPL
149732	2004 KU_{15}	—	May 23, 2004	Kitt Peak	Spacewatch	·	1.2 km	MPC · JPL
149733	2004 LL_{7}	—	June 11, 2004	Socorro	LINEAR	·	2.5 km	MPC · JPL
149734	2004 LV_{8}	—	June 12, 2004	Socorro	LINEAR	·	5.3 km	MPC · JPL
149735	2004 LC_{11}	—	June 10, 2004	Campo Imperatore	CINEOS	·	3.9 km	MPC · JPL
149736	2004 LH_{24}	—	June 12, 2004	Socorro	LINEAR	EUN	2.9 km	MPC · JPL
149737	2004 LS_{29}	—	June 14, 2004	Kitt Peak	Spacewatch	HOF	3.9 km	MPC · JPL
149738	2004 NH_{2}	—	July 9, 2004	Siding Spring	SSS	TIR	2.5 km	MPC · JPL
149739	2004 ND_{5}	—	July 9, 2004	Socorro	LINEAR	NYS	1.8 km	MPC · JPL
149740	2004 NL_{6}	—	July 11, 2004	Socorro	LINEAR	·	6.3 km	MPC · JPL
149741	2004 NQ_{12}	—	July 11, 2004	Socorro	LINEAR	EOS	4.0 km	MPC · JPL
149742	2004 NF_{13}	—	July 11, 2004	Socorro	LINEAR	·	5.6 km	MPC · JPL
149743	2004 ND_{16}	—	July 11, 2004	Socorro	LINEAR	·	3.4 km	MPC · JPL
149744	2004 NO_{17}	—	July 11, 2004	Socorro	LINEAR	·	3.8 km	MPC · JPL
149745	2004 NR_{22}	—	July 11, 2004	Socorro	LINEAR	CYB	10 km	MPC · JPL
149746	2004 NW_{30}	—	July 9, 2004	Anderson Mesa	LONEOS	·	5.6 km	MPC · JPL
149747	2004 OT_{2}	—	July 16, 2004	Socorro	LINEAR	·	6.6 km	MPC · JPL
149748	2004 OY_{2}	—	July 16, 2004	Socorro	LINEAR	·	5.2 km	MPC · JPL
149749	2004 OQ_{4}	—	July 16, 2004	Socorro	LINEAR	·	3.5 km	MPC · JPL
149750	2004 OE_{5}	—	July 16, 2004	Socorro	LINEAR	·	3.6 km	MPC · JPL
149751	2004 OW_{7}	—	July 16, 2004	Socorro	LINEAR	·	2.7 km	MPC · JPL
149752	2004 OE_{10}	—	July 21, 2004	Reedy Creek	J. Broughton	·	3.2 km	MPC · JPL
149753	2004 PH_{12}	—	August 7, 2004	Palomar	NEAT	·	3.0 km	MPC · JPL
149754	2004 PR_{12}	—	August 7, 2004	Palomar	NEAT	·	6.6 km	MPC · JPL
149755	2004 PE_{18}	—	August 8, 2004	Anderson Mesa	LONEOS	·	3.7 km	MPC · JPL
149756	2004 PC_{28}	—	August 5, 2004	Palomar	NEAT	·	3.3 km	MPC · JPL
149757	2004 PO_{55}	—	August 8, 2004	Anderson Mesa	LONEOS	·	5.3 km	MPC · JPL
149758	2004 PY_{62}	—	August 10, 2004	Socorro	LINEAR	·	5.5 km	MPC · JPL
149759	2004 PR_{69}	—	August 7, 2004	Palomar	NEAT	·	8.8 km	MPC · JPL
149760	2004 PR_{71}	—	August 8, 2004	Socorro	LINEAR	·	1.9 km	MPC · JPL
149761	2004 PT_{72}	—	August 8, 2004	Socorro	LINEAR	·	6.1 km	MPC · JPL
149762	2004 PE_{73}	—	August 8, 2004	Socorro	LINEAR	·	7.8 km	MPC · JPL
149763	2004 PH_{75}	—	August 8, 2004	Palomar	NEAT	EOS	3.5 km	MPC · JPL
149764	2004 PT_{98}	—	August 8, 2004	Socorro	LINEAR	·	8.3 km	MPC · JPL
149765	2004 PM_{106}	—	August 9, 2004	Socorro	LINEAR	·	3.6 km	MPC · JPL
149766	2004 PH_{110}	—	August 12, 2004	Socorro	LINEAR	·	3.0 km	MPC · JPL
149767	2004 QF_{2}	—	August 19, 2004	Reedy Creek	J. Broughton	VER	5.1 km	MPC · JPL
149768	2004 QP_{2}	—	August 20, 2004	Kitt Peak	Spacewatch	·	3.0 km	MPC · JPL
149769	2004 QM_{9}	—	August 21, 2004	Catalina	CSS	CYB	6.8 km	MPC · JPL
149770	2004 QO_{10}	—	August 21, 2004	Siding Spring	SSS	·	5.6 km	MPC · JPL
149771	2004 RP_{22}	—	September 7, 2004	Kitt Peak	Spacewatch	·	3.0 km	MPC · JPL
149772	2004 RN_{27}	—	September 6, 2004	Goodricke-Pigott	R. A. Tucker	·	8.3 km	MPC · JPL
149773	2004 RE_{37}	—	September 7, 2004	Socorro	LINEAR	·	4.2 km	MPC · JPL
149774	2004 RH_{107}	—	September 9, 2004	Socorro	LINEAR	3:2	8.4 km	MPC · JPL
149775	2004 RV_{121}	—	September 7, 2004	Kitt Peak	Spacewatch	THM	2.9 km	MPC · JPL
149776	2004 RU_{152}	—	September 10, 2004	Socorro	LINEAR	SYL · CYB	8.1 km	MPC · JPL
149777	2004 RX_{208}	—	September 11, 2004	Socorro	LINEAR	·	4.6 km	MPC · JPL
149778	2004 RQ_{215}	—	September 11, 2004	Socorro	LINEAR	·	4.5 km	MPC · JPL
149779	2004 RY_{255}	—	September 6, 2004	Palomar	NEAT	·	6.9 km	MPC · JPL
149780	2004 RN_{313}	—	September 15, 2004	Kitt Peak	Spacewatch	·	4.5 km	MPC · JPL
149781	2004 RV_{321}	—	September 13, 2004	Socorro	LINEAR	·	4.8 km	MPC · JPL
149782	2004 RZ_{343}	—	September 9, 2004	Anderson Mesa	LONEOS	·	3.9 km	MPC · JPL
149783	2004 TH_{87}	—	October 5, 2004	Kitt Peak	Spacewatch	THM	4.7 km	MPC · JPL
149784	2004 TM_{221}	—	October 7, 2004	Palomar	NEAT	·	5.8 km	MPC · JPL
149785	2005 BW_{5}	—	January 16, 2005	Socorro	LINEAR	·	2.5 km	MPC · JPL
149786	2005 EG_{28}	—	March 3, 2005	Catalina	CSS	·	3.5 km	MPC · JPL
149787	2005 ER_{94}	—	March 10, 2005	Goodricke-Pigott	R. A. Tucker	·	1.2 km	MPC · JPL
149788	2005 EY_{323}	—	March 12, 2005	Mount Lemmon	Mount Lemmon Survey	·	1.3 km	MPC · JPL
149789	2005 GS_{5}	—	April 1, 2005	Kitt Peak	Spacewatch	·	1.2 km	MPC · JPL
149790	2005 GK_{20}	—	April 2, 2005	Anderson Mesa	LONEOS	·	1.2 km	MPC · JPL
149791	2005 GU_{23}	—	April 1, 2005	Anderson Mesa	LONEOS	·	1.3 km	MPC · JPL
149792	2005 GW_{24}	—	April 2, 2005	Kitt Peak	Spacewatch	·	1.7 km	MPC · JPL
149793	2005 GO_{126}	—	April 11, 2005	Mount Lemmon	Mount Lemmon Survey	·	1.2 km	MPC · JPL
149794	2005 GS_{144}	—	April 10, 2005	Kitt Peak	Spacewatch	·	1.5 km	MPC · JPL
149795	2005 GG_{153}	—	April 13, 2005	Anderson Mesa	LONEOS	·	1.1 km	MPC · JPL
149796	2005 HH_{7}	—	April 30, 2005	Kitt Peak	Spacewatch	·	1.3 km	MPC · JPL
149797	2005 JR_{29}	—	May 3, 2005	Socorro	LINEAR	·	2.2 km	MPC · JPL
149798	2005 JH_{34}	—	May 4, 2005	Kitt Peak	Spacewatch	·	1.2 km	MPC · JPL
149799	2005 JL_{45}	—	May 6, 2005	Catalina	CSS	H	1.2 km	MPC · JPL
149800	2005 JR_{104}	—	May 10, 2005	Kitt Peak	Spacewatch	EUN	1.5 km	MPC · JPL

== 149801–149900 ==
back to top

Designation			Discovery			Properties		Ref
Permanent	Provisional	Named after	Date	Site	Discoverer(s)	Category	Diam.	Ref
149801	2005 JC_{133}	—	May 14, 2005	Kitt Peak	Spacewatch	·	4.0 km	MPC · JPL
149802	2005 JR_{148}	—	May 3, 2005	Kitt Peak	Spacewatch	NYS	2.2 km	MPC · JPL
149803	2005 KX_{12}	—	May 16, 2005	Mount Lemmon	Mount Lemmon Survey	·	2.6 km	MPC · JPL
149804	2005 KC_{13}	—	May 22, 2005	Palomar	NEAT	·	1.6 km	MPC · JPL
149805	2005 LP_{13}	—	June 4, 2005	Kitt Peak	Spacewatch	·	3.5 km	MPC · JPL
149806	2005 LL_{22}	—	June 8, 2005	Kitt Peak	Spacewatch	·	1.2 km	MPC · JPL
149807	2005 LY_{32}	—	June 10, 2005	Kitt Peak	Spacewatch	V	1.0 km	MPC · JPL
149808	2005 LZ_{32}	—	June 10, 2005	Kitt Peak	Spacewatch	·	1.0 km	MPC · JPL
149809	2005 MB_{2}	—	June 26, 2005	Mount Lemmon	Mount Lemmon Survey	H	830 m	MPC · JPL
149810	2005 MT_{2}	—	June 17, 2005	Mount Lemmon	Mount Lemmon Survey	NYS	1.9 km	MPC · JPL
149811	2005 MZ_{8}	—	June 28, 2005	Kitt Peak	Spacewatch	·	3.2 km	MPC · JPL
149812	2005 MN_{26}	—	June 28, 2005	Palomar	NEAT	·	1.6 km	MPC · JPL
149813	2005 MJ_{32}	—	June 28, 2005	Palomar	NEAT	·	2.0 km	MPC · JPL
149814	2005 MF_{34}	—	June 29, 2005	Palomar	NEAT	·	3.6 km	MPC · JPL
149815	2005 MG_{34}	—	June 29, 2005	Palomar	NEAT	·	2.6 km	MPC · JPL
149816	2005 MS_{37}	—	June 30, 2005	Kitt Peak	Spacewatch	EOS	3.1 km	MPC · JPL
149817	2005 MP_{41}	—	June 30, 2005	Kitt Peak	Spacewatch	·	1.6 km	MPC · JPL
149818	2005 MD_{49}	—	June 29, 2005	Palomar	NEAT	·	2.1 km	MPC · JPL
149819	2005 NJ	—	July 1, 2005	Anderson Mesa	LONEOS	TIR	4.5 km	MPC · JPL
149820	2005 NY	—	July 1, 2005	Catalina	CSS	PHO	1.6 km	MPC · JPL
149821	2005 NE_{9}	—	July 1, 2005	Kitt Peak	Spacewatch	·	1.7 km	MPC · JPL
149822	2005 NM_{11}	—	July 3, 2005	Mount Lemmon	Mount Lemmon Survey	·	2.3 km	MPC · JPL
149823	2005 NN_{27}	—	July 5, 2005	Mount Lemmon	Mount Lemmon Survey	·	880 m	MPC · JPL
149824	2005 ND_{30}	—	July 4, 2005	Kitt Peak	Spacewatch	ERI	2.6 km	MPC · JPL
149825	2005 NK_{39}	—	July 7, 2005	Reedy Creek	J. Broughton	·	2.6 km	MPC · JPL
149826	2005 NN_{39}	—	July 7, 2005	Reedy Creek	J. Broughton	·	2.1 km	MPC · JPL
149827	2005 NQ_{58}	—	July 6, 2005	Kitt Peak	Spacewatch	·	2.1 km	MPC · JPL
149828	2005 NZ_{62}	—	July 11, 2005	Mount Lemmon	Mount Lemmon Survey	NYS	1.5 km	MPC · JPL
149829	2005 NP_{65}	—	July 1, 2005	Kitt Peak	Spacewatch	·	1.3 km	MPC · JPL
149830	2005 NK_{99}	—	July 10, 2005	Catalina	CSS	·	2.4 km	MPC · JPL
149831 Okeke	2005 NG_{101}	Okeke	July 12, 2005	Catalina	CSS	LIX	5.5 km	MPC · JPL
149832	2005 OS_{6}	—	July 28, 2005	Palomar	NEAT	NYS	2.2 km	MPC · JPL
149833	2005 OO_{11}	—	July 28, 2005	Palomar	NEAT	·	1.3 km	MPC · JPL
149834	2005 OT_{14}	—	July 31, 2005	Siding Spring	SSS	NYS	1.8 km	MPC · JPL
149835	2005 OR_{15}	—	July 29, 2005	Palomar	NEAT	·	2.7 km	MPC · JPL
149836	2005 OO_{19}	—	July 28, 2005	Palomar	NEAT	·	2.1 km	MPC · JPL
149837	2005 OX_{20}	—	July 28, 2005	Palomar	NEAT	·	2.4 km	MPC · JPL
149838	2005 OZ_{21}	—	July 29, 2005	Palomar	NEAT	·	2.1 km	MPC · JPL
149839	2005 OP_{27}	—	July 31, 2005	Palomar	NEAT	·	1.8 km	MPC · JPL
149840	2005 PO_{1}	—	August 1, 2005	Siding Spring	SSS	V	1.0 km	MPC · JPL
149841	2005 PT_{2}	—	August 2, 2005	Socorro	LINEAR	·	1.3 km	MPC · JPL
149842	2005 PP_{6}	—	August 9, 2005	Reedy Creek	J. Broughton	·	2.9 km	MPC · JPL
149843	2005 PX_{15}	—	August 4, 2005	Palomar	NEAT	·	1.9 km	MPC · JPL
149844	2005 PC_{18}	—	August 8, 2005	Siding Spring	SSS	·	3.0 km	MPC · JPL
149845	2005 PE_{20}	—	August 15, 2005	Reedy Creek	J. Broughton	·	2.7 km	MPC · JPL
149846	2005 PY_{20}	—	August 15, 2005	Siding Spring	SSS	·	2.7 km	MPC · JPL
149847	2005 QO_{1}	—	August 22, 2005	Palomar	NEAT	·	1.7 km	MPC · JPL
149848	2005 QX_{3}	—	August 24, 2005	Palomar	NEAT	·	1.9 km	MPC · JPL
149849	2005 QH_{6}	—	August 24, 2005	Palomar	NEAT	·	2.8 km	MPC · JPL
149850	2005 QN_{8}	—	August 25, 2005	Palomar	NEAT	MAS	1.3 km	MPC · JPL
149851	2005 QS_{9}	—	August 24, 2005	Palomar	NEAT	·	2.5 km	MPC · JPL
149852	2005 QB_{10}	—	August 25, 2005	Campo Imperatore	CINEOS	CYB	5.5 km	MPC · JPL
149853	2005 QX_{26}	—	August 27, 2005	Kitt Peak	Spacewatch	·	3.0 km	MPC · JPL
149854	2005 QF_{31}	—	August 22, 2005	Palomar	NEAT	·	1.6 km	MPC · JPL
149855	2005 QZ_{40}	—	August 26, 2005	Anderson Mesa	LONEOS	·	1.4 km	MPC · JPL
149856	2005 QG_{46}	—	August 26, 2005	Palomar	NEAT	·	950 m	MPC · JPL
149857	2005 QT_{52}	—	August 27, 2005	Siding Spring	SSS	NYS	1.8 km	MPC · JPL
149858	2005 QS_{53}	—	August 28, 2005	Kitt Peak	Spacewatch	·	1.2 km	MPC · JPL
149859	2005 QA_{55}	—	August 28, 2005	Anderson Mesa	LONEOS	THM	3.6 km	MPC · JPL
149860	2005 QA_{56}	—	August 28, 2005	Kitt Peak	Spacewatch	·	2.9 km	MPC · JPL
149861	2005 QA_{63}	—	August 26, 2005	Palomar	NEAT	·	2.6 km	MPC · JPL
149862	2005 QR_{72}	—	August 29, 2005	Kitt Peak	Spacewatch	·	3.3 km	MPC · JPL
149863	2005 QP_{74}	—	August 29, 2005	Anderson Mesa	LONEOS	·	3.2 km	MPC · JPL
149864	2005 QE_{83}	—	August 29, 2005	Anderson Mesa	LONEOS	·	1.7 km	MPC · JPL
149865 Michelhernandez	2005 QS_{88}	Michelhernandez	August 29, 2005	Saint-Véran	St. Veran	MIS	3.6 km	MPC · JPL
149866	2005 QV_{90}	—	August 25, 2005	Palomar	NEAT	AGN	1.8 km	MPC · JPL
149867	2005 QX_{90}	—	August 25, 2005	Palomar	NEAT	·	1.0 km	MPC · JPL
149868	2005 QH_{95}	—	August 27, 2005	Palomar	NEAT	NYS	1.6 km	MPC · JPL
149869	2005 QF_{106}	—	August 27, 2005	Palomar	NEAT	·	1.2 km	MPC · JPL
149870	2005 QT_{121}	—	August 28, 2005	Kitt Peak	Spacewatch	·	1.6 km	MPC · JPL
149871	2005 QQ_{137}	—	August 28, 2005	Kitt Peak	Spacewatch	(17392)	1.8 km	MPC · JPL
149872	2005 QL_{140}	—	August 28, 2005	Kitt Peak	Spacewatch	THM	3.1 km	MPC · JPL
149873	2005 QA_{144}	—	August 26, 2005	Palomar	NEAT	·	5.4 km	MPC · JPL
149874	2005 QN_{146}	—	August 28, 2005	Siding Spring	SSS	·	2.7 km	MPC · JPL
149875	2005 QB_{149}	—	August 31, 2005	Socorro	LINEAR	·	4.6 km	MPC · JPL
149876	2005 QL_{157}	—	August 30, 2005	Palomar	NEAT	·	3.1 km	MPC · JPL
149877	2005 QK_{158}	—	August 26, 2005	Palomar	NEAT	·	2.5 km	MPC · JPL
149878	2005 QH_{164}	—	August 31, 2005	Palomar	NEAT	·	2.5 km	MPC · JPL
149879	2005 QB_{178}	—	August 28, 2005	Anderson Mesa	LONEOS	·	2.0 km	MPC · JPL
149880	2005 QV_{178}	—	August 29, 2005	Palomar	NEAT	·	1.9 km	MPC · JPL
149881	2005 RZ	—	September 1, 2005	Socorro	LINEAR	PHO	4.4 km	MPC · JPL
149882	2005 RM_{4}	—	September 6, 2005	Bergisch Gladbach	W. Bickel	·	1.9 km	MPC · JPL
149883	2005 RT_{4}	—	September 1, 2005	Siding Spring	SSS	PHO	1.8 km	MPC · JPL
149884 Radebeul	2005 RD_{9}	Radebeul	September 9, 2005	Radebeul	M. Fiedler	·	4.5 km	MPC · JPL
149885	2005 RV_{11}	—	September 11, 2005	Junk Bond	D. Healy	KOR	1.9 km	MPC · JPL
149886	2005 RX_{20}	—	September 1, 2005	Palomar	NEAT	·	3.2 km	MPC · JPL
149887	2005 RA_{22}	—	September 6, 2005	Socorro	LINEAR	·	3.7 km	MPC · JPL
149888	2005 RK_{23}	—	September 9, 2005	Socorro	LINEAR	·	2.1 km	MPC · JPL
149889	2005 RT_{23}	—	September 10, 2005	Anderson Mesa	LONEOS	·	3.1 km	MPC · JPL
149890	2005 RV_{23}	—	September 10, 2005	Anderson Mesa	LONEOS	·	2.2 km	MPC · JPL
149891	2005 RG_{27}	—	September 10, 2005	Anderson Mesa	LONEOS	ADE	5.3 km	MPC · JPL
149892	2005 RA_{29}	—	September 11, 2005	Socorro	LINEAR	·	3.4 km	MPC · JPL
149893	2005 RD_{30}	—	September 9, 2005	Socorro	LINEAR	·	3.3 km	MPC · JPL
149894	2005 RD_{33}	—	September 14, 2005	Catalina	CSS	·	3.1 km	MPC · JPL
149895	2005 RN_{44}	—	September 14, 2005	Catalina	CSS	·	3.2 km	MPC · JPL
149896	2005 SD_{1}	—	September 23, 2005	Junk Bond	D. Healy	·	2.9 km	MPC · JPL
149897	2005 ST_{7}	—	September 24, 2005	Kitt Peak	Spacewatch	·	2.4 km	MPC · JPL
149898	2005 SG_{8}	—	September 25, 2005	Catalina	CSS	·	5.9 km	MPC · JPL
149899	2005 SC_{20}	—	September 23, 2005	Kitt Peak	Spacewatch	·	1.1 km	MPC · JPL
149900	2005 SK_{24}	—	September 24, 2005	Anderson Mesa	LONEOS	·	3.0 km	MPC · JPL

== 149901–150000 ==
back to top

Designation			Discovery			Properties		Ref
Permanent	Provisional	Named after	Date	Site	Discoverer(s)	Category	Diam.	Ref
149901	2005 SK_{35}	—	September 23, 2005	Kitt Peak	Spacewatch	KOR	2.1 km	MPC · JPL
149902	2005 SR_{35}	—	September 23, 2005	Kitt Peak	Spacewatch	EOS	4.3 km	MPC · JPL
149903	2005 SE_{37}	—	September 24, 2005	Kitt Peak	Spacewatch	·	4.1 km	MPC · JPL
149904	2005 SB_{38}	—	September 24, 2005	Kitt Peak	Spacewatch	·	2.9 km	MPC · JPL
149905	2005 SF_{45}	—	September 24, 2005	Kitt Peak	Spacewatch	·	1.7 km	MPC · JPL
149906	2005 SM_{45}	—	September 24, 2005	Kitt Peak	Spacewatch	GEF	2.1 km	MPC · JPL
149907	2005 SB_{46}	—	September 24, 2005	Kitt Peak	Spacewatch	NYS ·	1.6 km	MPC · JPL
149908	2005 SO_{50}	—	September 24, 2005	Kitt Peak	Spacewatch	KOR	1.9 km	MPC · JPL
149909	2005 SY_{52}	—	September 25, 2005	Kitt Peak	Spacewatch	·	5.5 km	MPC · JPL
149910	2005 SA_{66}	—	September 26, 2005	Catalina	CSS	·	9.6 km	MPC · JPL
149911	2005 SE_{69}	—	September 27, 2005	Kitt Peak	Spacewatch	·	1.6 km	MPC · JPL
149912	2005 SL_{73}	—	September 23, 2005	Kitt Peak	Spacewatch	·	6.7 km	MPC · JPL
149913	2005 SU_{73}	—	September 23, 2005	Catalina	CSS	PHO	2.1 km	MPC · JPL
149914	2005 SB_{76}	—	September 24, 2005	Kitt Peak	Spacewatch	·	2.0 km	MPC · JPL
149915	2005 SA_{88}	—	September 24, 2005	Kitt Peak	Spacewatch	·	1.7 km	MPC · JPL
149916	2005 SK_{101}	—	September 25, 2005	Kitt Peak	Spacewatch	·	2.0 km	MPC · JPL
149917	2005 SN_{102}	—	September 25, 2005	Kitt Peak	Spacewatch	·	2.7 km	MPC · JPL
149918	2005 SU_{105}	—	September 25, 2005	Palomar	NEAT	·	2.9 km	MPC · JPL
149919	2005 SR_{106}	—	September 26, 2005	Kitt Peak	Spacewatch	·	2.5 km	MPC · JPL
149920	2005 SH_{112}	—	September 26, 2005	Palomar	NEAT	·	2.8 km	MPC · JPL
149921	2005 SZ_{112}	—	September 26, 2005	Palomar	NEAT	·	4.8 km	MPC · JPL
149922	2005 SF_{113}	—	September 26, 2005	Palomar	NEAT	·	3.5 km	MPC · JPL
149923	2005 SK_{114}	—	September 27, 2005	Kitt Peak	Spacewatch	·	2.0 km	MPC · JPL
149924	2005 SS_{116}	—	September 27, 2005	Kingsnake	J. V. McClusky	WIT	1.5 km	MPC · JPL
149925	2005 SL_{119}	—	September 28, 2005	Palomar	NEAT	·	2.6 km	MPC · JPL
149926	2005 SU_{124}	—	September 29, 2005	Kitt Peak	Spacewatch	·	1.8 km	MPC · JPL
149927	2005 SB_{125}	—	September 29, 2005	Palomar	NEAT	·	2.5 km	MPC · JPL
149928	2005 SP_{144}	—	September 25, 2005	Kitt Peak	Spacewatch	·	2.4 km	MPC · JPL
149929	2005 SV_{149}	—	September 25, 2005	Kitt Peak	Spacewatch	·	1.7 km	MPC · JPL
149930	2005 SP_{152}	—	September 25, 2005	Palomar	NEAT	EOS	4.3 km	MPC · JPL
149931	2005 SY_{155}	—	September 26, 2005	Kitt Peak	Spacewatch	NYS	2.0 km	MPC · JPL
149932	2005 SC_{166}	—	September 28, 2005	Palomar	NEAT	·	6.2 km	MPC · JPL
149933	2005 SQ_{179}	—	September 29, 2005	Anderson Mesa	LONEOS	·	2.8 km	MPC · JPL
149934	2005 SD_{191}	—	September 29, 2005	Palomar	NEAT	HYG	5.1 km	MPC · JPL
149935	2005 SQ_{193}	—	September 29, 2005	Kitt Peak	Spacewatch	·	2.5 km	MPC · JPL
149936	2005 SG_{195}	—	September 30, 2005	Catalina	CSS	V	1.3 km	MPC · JPL
149937	2005 SH_{209}	—	September 30, 2005	Socorro	LINEAR	·	4.7 km	MPC · JPL
149938	2005 ST_{210}	—	September 30, 2005	Palomar	NEAT	·	2.0 km	MPC · JPL
149939	2005 SZ_{216}	—	September 30, 2005	Palomar	NEAT	·	3.3 km	MPC · JPL
149940	2005 ST_{219}	—	September 26, 2005	Palomar	NEAT	·	2.4 km	MPC · JPL
149941	2005 SM_{221}	—	September 30, 2005	Mount Lemmon	Mount Lemmon Survey	·	2.7 km	MPC · JPL
149942	2005 SB_{233}	—	September 30, 2005	Mount Lemmon	Mount Lemmon Survey	KOR	2.0 km	MPC · JPL
149943	2005 SV_{249}	—	September 23, 2005	Catalina	CSS	V	1.1 km	MPC · JPL
149944	2005 SD_{250}	—	September 23, 2005	Catalina	CSS	(5)	1.5 km	MPC · JPL
149945	2005 SW_{250}	—	September 23, 2005	Kitt Peak	Spacewatch	EOS ·	6.4 km	MPC · JPL
149946	2005 SK_{251}	—	September 24, 2005	Palomar	NEAT	·	3.6 km	MPC · JPL
149947	2005 SG_{257}	—	September 22, 2005	Palomar	NEAT	·	1.9 km	MPC · JPL
149948	2005 TG_{1}	—	October 1, 2005	Mount Lemmon	Mount Lemmon Survey	·	2.9 km	MPC · JPL
149949	2005 TM_{9}	—	October 1, 2005	Kitt Peak	Spacewatch	·	2.8 km	MPC · JPL
149950	2005 TW_{13}	—	October 1, 2005	Socorro	LINEAR	V	1.2 km	MPC · JPL
149951 Hildakowalski	2005 TL_{14}	Hildakowalski	October 3, 2005	Catalina	CSS	·	1.8 km	MPC · JPL
149952 Susanhamann	2005 TK_{15}	Susanhamann	October 1, 2005	Catalina	CSS	·	1.9 km	MPC · JPL
149953	2005 TD_{31}	—	October 1, 2005	Socorro	LINEAR	HOF	5.0 km	MPC · JPL
149954	2005 TV_{48}	—	October 9, 2005	Junk Bond	D. Healy	KOR	2.0 km	MPC · JPL
149955 Maron	2005 TK_{49}	Maron	October 9, 2005	Hormersdorf	Lorenz, J.	PHO	1.6 km	MPC · JPL
149956	2005 TE_{54}	—	October 1, 2005	Mount Lemmon	Mount Lemmon Survey	·	2.3 km	MPC · JPL
149957	2005 TJ_{72}	—	October 4, 2005	Palomar	NEAT	·	5.4 km	MPC · JPL
149958	2005 TY_{73}	—	October 7, 2005	Anderson Mesa	LONEOS	PAD	2.8 km	MPC · JPL
149959	2005 TF_{74}	—	October 7, 2005	Anderson Mesa	LONEOS	EOS	3.6 km	MPC · JPL
149960	2005 TV_{77}	—	October 6, 2005	Mount Lemmon	Mount Lemmon Survey	KOR	1.9 km	MPC · JPL
149961	2005 TB_{90}	—	October 5, 2005	Mount Lemmon	Mount Lemmon Survey	KOR	2.3 km	MPC · JPL
149962	2005 TQ_{95}	—	October 6, 2005	Anderson Mesa	LONEOS	·	4.3 km	MPC · JPL
149963	2005 TP_{103}	—	October 8, 2005	Socorro	LINEAR	V	1.0 km	MPC · JPL
149964	2005 TX_{104}	—	October 8, 2005	Socorro	LINEAR	·	2.9 km	MPC · JPL
149965	2005 TB_{105}	—	October 8, 2005	Socorro	LINEAR	·	4.4 km	MPC · JPL
149966	2005 TY_{106}	—	October 4, 2005	Mount Lemmon	Mount Lemmon Survey	·	2.9 km	MPC · JPL
149967	2005 TK_{126}	—	October 7, 2005	Kitt Peak	Spacewatch	·	5.3 km	MPC · JPL
149968 Trondal	2005 TF_{152}	Trondal	October 11, 2005	Nogales	Tenagra II	·	2.4 km	MPC · JPL
149969	2005 TE_{154}	—	October 8, 2005	Socorro	LINEAR	(1298)	2.8 km	MPC · JPL
149970	2005 TF_{155}	—	October 9, 2005	Kitt Peak	Spacewatch	·	2.2 km	MPC · JPL
149971	2005 TO_{159}	—	October 9, 2005	Kitt Peak	Spacewatch	·	2.5 km	MPC · JPL
149972	2005 TQ_{180}	—	October 1, 2005	Anderson Mesa	LONEOS	HYG	4.9 km	MPC · JPL
149973	2005 TV_{183}	—	October 9, 2005	Catalina	CSS	·	2.1 km	MPC · JPL
149974	2005 TY_{191}	—	October 4, 2005	Catalina	CSS	SYL · CYB	7.0 km	MPC · JPL
149975	2005 UY_{1}	—	October 22, 2005	Junk Bond	D. Healy	·	3.5 km	MPC · JPL
149976	2005 UO_{6}	—	October 24, 2005	Wrightwood	J. W. Young	·	4.6 km	MPC · JPL
149977	2005 UK_{9}	—	October 21, 2005	Palomar	NEAT	·	2.1 km	MPC · JPL
149978	2005 UP_{9}	—	October 21, 2005	Palomar	NEAT	·	2.5 km	MPC · JPL
149979	2005 UK_{10}	—	October 21, 2005	Palomar	NEAT	·	3.3 km	MPC · JPL
149980	2005 UU_{19}	—	October 22, 2005	Kitt Peak	Spacewatch	·	4.7 km	MPC · JPL
149981	2005 UO_{22}	—	October 23, 2005	Kitt Peak	Spacewatch	·	2.1 km	MPC · JPL
149982	2005 UJ_{23}	—	October 23, 2005	Kitt Peak	Spacewatch	KOR	2.5 km	MPC · JPL
149983	2005 UF_{55}	—	October 23, 2005	Catalina	CSS	·	5.0 km	MPC · JPL
149984	2005 UT_{56}	—	October 24, 2005	Anderson Mesa	LONEOS	·	2.3 km	MPC · JPL
149985	2005 UL_{57}	—	October 24, 2005	Anderson Mesa	LONEOS	·	1.9 km	MPC · JPL
149986	2005 UV_{58}	—	October 24, 2005	Kitt Peak	Spacewatch	·	3.4 km	MPC · JPL
149987	2005 UW_{62}	—	October 25, 2005	Mount Lemmon	Mount Lemmon Survey	KOR	2.1 km	MPC · JPL
149988	2005 UK_{64}	—	October 25, 2005	Catalina	CSS	·	3.2 km	MPC · JPL
149989	2005 UD_{68}	—	October 22, 2005	Palomar	NEAT	·	5.5 km	MPC · JPL
149990	2005 UM_{68}	—	October 22, 2005	Palomar	NEAT	·	3.2 km	MPC · JPL
149991	2005 UA_{71}	—	October 23, 2005	Catalina	CSS	·	2.9 km	MPC · JPL
149992	2005 UC_{71}	—	October 23, 2005	Catalina	CSS	·	3.6 km	MPC · JPL
149993	2005 UN_{72}	—	October 23, 2005	Palomar	NEAT	·	4.1 km	MPC · JPL
149994	2005 UZ_{73}	—	October 23, 2005	Palomar	NEAT	·	5.8 km	MPC · JPL
149995	2005 UH_{75}	—	October 24, 2005	Palomar	NEAT	·	3.7 km	MPC · JPL
149996	2005 UM_{114}	—	October 22, 2005	Catalina	CSS	VER	4.4 km	MPC · JPL
149997	2005 UT_{124}	—	October 24, 2005	Kitt Peak	Spacewatch	·	5.1 km	MPC · JPL
149998	2005 UK_{130}	—	October 24, 2005	Palomar	NEAT	EUN	2.5 km	MPC · JPL
149999	2005 UH_{132}	—	October 24, 2005	Palomar	NEAT	·	9.5 km	MPC · JPL
150000	2005 UC_{142}	—	October 25, 2005	Catalina	CSS	·	5.0 km	MPC · JPL

back to top

== See also ==
- Meanings of minor-planet names: 149001–150000
