= Meanings of minor-planet names: 149001–150000 =

As minor planet discoveries are confirmed, they are given a permanent number by the IAU's Minor Planet Center (MPC), and the discoverers can then submit names for them, following the IAU's naming conventions. The list below concerns those minor planets in the specified number-range that have received names, and explains the meanings of those names.

Official naming citations of newly named small Solar System bodies are approved and published in a bulletin by IAU's Working Group for Small Bodies Nomenclature (WGSBN). Before May 2021, citations were published in MPC's Minor Planet Circulars for many decades. Recent citations can also be found on the JPL Small-Body Database (SBDB). Until his death in 2016, German astronomer Lutz D. Schmadel compiled these citations into the Dictionary of Minor Planet Names (DMP) and regularly updated the collection.

Based on Paul Herget's The Names of the Minor Planets, Schmadel also researched the unclear origin of numerous asteroids, most of which had been named prior to World War II. This article incorporates text from this source, which is in the public domain: SBDB New namings may only be added to this list below after official publication as the preannouncement of names is condemned. The WGSBN publishes a comprehensive guideline for the naming rules of non-cometary small Solar System bodies.

== 149001–149100 ==
Named minor planet	Provisional	This minor planet was named for...	Ref · Catalog
There are no named minor planets in this number range

== 149101–149200 ==
back to top

Named minor planet	Provisional	This minor planet was named for...	Ref · Catalog
149113 Stewartbushman	2002 CK_{258}	Stewart Bushman (born 1973), senior engineer at the Johns Hopkins University Applied Physics Laboratory. He served as the Propulsion Lead for the New Horizons mission to Pluto.	JPL · 149113
149115 Lauriecantillo	2002 CG_{271}	Laurie L. Cantillo (born 1958) served as the NASA Public Affairs Lead for the New Horizons mission to Pluto.	JPL · 149115
149157 Stephencarr	2002 FN_{26}	Stephen S. Carr (born 1959) is a program manager at the Johns Hopkins University Applied Physics Laboratory. He served as the director of public events for the flyby encounter for the New Horizons mission to Pluto.	JPL · 149157
149160 Geojih	2002 GE	Geojih is an open, friendly and amateur group of geocaching fans in České Budějovice. They started geocaching activities in 2008 and have prepared many smart geocaches and amazing geocaching events up to now. A series of seven geocoins devoted to south Bohemian districts was also issued.	JPL · 149160
149163 Stevenconard	2002 GF_{31}	Steven J. Conard (born 1959) is an optical engineer at the Johns Hopkins University Applied Physics Laboratory. He served as the Lead Instrument Engineer for the LORRI instrument for the New Horizons mission to Pluto.	JPL · 149163
149195 Lucianaziino	2002 PH	Luciana Ziino, Italian astrophysicist.	IAU · 149195

== 149201–149300 ==
back to top

Named minor planet	Provisional	This minor planet was named for...	Ref · Catalog
149233 Bartolofazio	2002 RP_{118}	Bartolo Fazio, Italian engineer.	IAU · 149233
149243 Dorothynorton	2002 RL_{239}	Dorothy S. Norton (born 1945), scientific illustrator specializing in astronomy, geology and paleontology	JPL · 149243
149244 Kriegh	2002 RZ_{240}	James D. Kriegh (1928–2007), American civil engineering professor and meteorite hunter	JPL · 149244
149270 Andreacimatti	2002 TG_{70}	Andrea Cimatti, Italian full professor of galaxy formation and evolution at Bologna University.	IAU · 149270

== 149301–149400 ==
back to top

Named minor planet	Provisional	This minor planet was named for...	Ref · Catalog
There are no named minor planets in this number range

== 149401–149500 ==
back to top

Named minor planet	Provisional	This minor planet was named for...	Ref · Catalog
There are no named minor planets in this number range

== 149501–149600 ==
back to top

Named minor planet	Provisional	This minor planet was named for...	Ref · Catalog
149528 Simónrodríguez	2003 FD_{129}	Simón Rodríguez (1769–1854) Venezuelan pedagogue and philosopher, teacher and mentor of Simón Bolivar, The Liberator	JPL · 149528
149573 Mamorudoi	2003 YK_{180}	Mamoru Doi (born 1964), Japanese astronomer with the Sloan Digital Sky Survey	JPL · 149573

== 149601–149700 ==
back to top

Named minor planet	Provisional	This minor planet was named for...	Ref · Catalog
There are no named minor planets in this number range

== 149701–149800 ==
back to top

Named minor planet	Provisional	This minor planet was named for...	Ref · Catalog
149728 Klostermann	2004 KR_{1}	Karel Klostermann (1848–1923), Czech and Austrian novelist and writer of short stories	JPL · 149728

== 149801–149900 ==
back to top

Named minor planet	Provisional	This minor planet was named for...	Ref · Catalog
149831 Okeke	2005 NG_{101}	Francisca Nneka Okeke, Nigerian physicist.	IAU · 149831
149865 Michelhernandez	2005 QS_{88}	Michel Hernandez (born 1970), French amateur astronomer and expert in spectroscopy	JPL · 149865
149884 Radebeul	2005 RD_{9}	The German town of Radebeul, Saxony, location of the Radebeul Observatory (A72), where this minor planet was discovered	JPL · 149884

== 149901–150000 ==
back to top

Named minor planet	Provisional	This minor planet was named for...	Ref · Catalog
149951 Hildakowalski	2005 TL_{14}	Hildegard Kowalski (born 1927), mother of one of the uncredited discoverers with the Catalina Sky Survey (presumably Richard Kowalski).	MPC · 149951
149952 Susanhamann	2005 TK_{15}	Susan Hamann (born 1953) has spent her career advancing medical technology and working on bringing these lifesaving technologies to both emergency and everyday usage.	JPL · 149952
149955 Maron	2005 TK_{49}	Marion Lorenz (born 1967), wife of the discoverer Joachim Lorenz and a committed teacher of sports and geography. Maron is her childhood nickname.	JPL · 149955
149968 Trondal	2005 TF_{152}	Odd Trondal (born 1951), a member of the Norwegian Astronomical Society since 1968, was elected a Member of Honour in 2003	JPL · 149968

back to top

Preceded by 148,001–149,000	Meanings of minor-planet names List of minor planets: 149,001–150,000	Succeeded by 150,001–151,000
