= Meanings of minor-planet names: 148001–149000 =

As minor planet discoveries are confirmed, they are given a permanent number by the IAU's Minor Planet Center (MPC), and the discoverers can then submit names for them, following the IAU's naming conventions. The list below concerns those minor planets in the specified number-range that have received names, and explains the meanings of those names.

Official naming citations of newly named small Solar System bodies are approved and published in a bulletin by IAU's Working Group for Small Bodies Nomenclature (WGSBN). Before May 2021, citations were published in MPC's Minor Planet Circulars for many decades. Recent citations can also be found on the JPL Small-Body Database (SBDB). Until his death in 2016, German astronomer Lutz D. Schmadel compiled these citations into the Dictionary of Minor Planet Names (DMP) and regularly updated the collection.

Based on Paul Herget's The Names of the Minor Planets, Schmadel also researched the unclear origin of numerous asteroids, most of which had been named prior to World War II. This article incorporates text from this source, which is in the public domain: SBDB New namings may only be added to this list below after official publication as the preannouncement of names is condemned. The WGSBN publishes a comprehensive guideline for the naming rules of non-cometary small Solar System bodies.

== 148001–148100 ==
Named minor planet	Provisional	This minor planet was named for...	Ref · Catalog
148081 Sunjiadong	1999 AW_{23}	Sun Jiadong (born 1929), aerospace-technologist-academician of the Chinese Academy of Sciences	JPL · 148081

== 148101–148200 ==
back to top

Named minor planet	Provisional	This minor planet was named for...	Ref · Catalog
There are no named minor planets in this number range

== 148201–148300 ==
back to top

Named minor planet	Provisional	This minor planet was named for...	Ref · Catalog
There are no named minor planets in this number range

== 148301–148400 ==
back to top

Named minor planet	Provisional	This minor planet was named for...	Ref · Catalog
148342 Carverbierson	2000 QJ_{242}	Carver J. Bierson (b. 1987), an American planetary scientist.	IAU · 148342
148384 Dalcanton	2000 SV_{373}	Julianne Dalcanton (born 1968), American astronomer with the Sloan Digital Sky Survey and discoverer of comet C/1999 F2	JPL · 148384

== 148401–148500 ==
back to top

Named minor planet	Provisional	This minor planet was named for...	Ref · Catalog
There are no named minor planets in this number range

== 148501–148600 ==
back to top

Named minor planet	Provisional	This minor planet was named for...	Ref · Catalog
148525 Gipieroconsigli	2001 QG	Gian Piero Consigli, brother-in-law of the second discoverer.	IAU · 148525

== 148601–148700 ==
back to top

Named minor planet	Provisional	This minor planet was named for...	Ref · Catalog
148604 Shobbrook	2001 RO_{63}	John Shobbrook (born 1948), American supporter of the Rose-Hulman Oakley Observatory in Indiana, where this minor planet was discovered	JPL · 148604

== 148701–148800 ==
back to top

Named minor planet	Provisional	This minor planet was named for...	Ref · Catalog
148707 Dodelson	2001 SC_{353}	Scott Dodelson (born 1959), American physicist with the Sloan Digital Sky Survey	JPL · 148707
148780 Altjira	2001 UQ_{18}	Altjira, from Australian Aboriginal mythology. He is the central god of the Dreamtime who created the Earth and then retired to the sky.	JPL · 148780

== 148801–148900 ==
back to top

Named minor planet	Provisional	This minor planet was named for...	Ref · Catalog
There are no named minor planets in this number range

== 148901–149000 ==
back to top

Named minor planet	Provisional	This minor planet was named for...	Ref · Catalog
There are no named minor planets in this number range

back to top

Preceded by 147,001–148,000	Meanings of minor-planet names List of minor planets: 148,001–149,000	Succeeded by 149,001–150,000
