= List of minor planets: 148001–149000 =

The following is a partial list of minor planets, running from minor-planet number 148001 through 149000, inclusive. The primary data for this and other partial lists is based on JPL's "Small-Body Orbital Elements" and data available from the Minor Planet Center. Critical list information is also provided by the MPC, unless otherwise specified from Lowell Observatory. A detailed description of the table's columns and additional sources are given on the main page including a complete list of every page in this series, and a statistical break-up on the dynamical classification of minor planets.

Also see the summary list of all named bodies in numerical and alphabetical order, and the corresponding naming citations for the number range of this particular list. New namings may only be added to this list after official publication, as the preannouncement of names is condemned by the Working Group for Small Bodies Nomenclature of the International Astronomical Union.

Near-Earth obj.	MBA (inner)	MBA (outer)	Centaur
Mars-crosser	MBA (middle)	Jupiter trojan	Trans-Neptunian obj.
Unclassified

== 148001–148100 ==
Designation			Discovery			Properties		Ref
Permanent	Provisional	Named after	Date	Site	Discoverer(s)	Category	Diam.	Ref
148001	1997 EX_{49}	—	March 5, 1997	La Silla	E. W. Elst	·	1.4 km	MPC · JPL
148002	1997 GF_{2}	—	April 7, 1997	Kitt Peak	Spacewatch	·	3.0 km	MPC · JPL
148003	1997 GN_{20}	—	April 5, 1997	Socorro	LINEAR	·	1.2 km	MPC · JPL
148004	1997 GP_{22}	—	April 6, 1997	Socorro	LINEAR	PHO	2.0 km	MPC · JPL
148005	1997 GF_{30}	—	April 7, 1997	Kitt Peak	Spacewatch	·	3.4 km	MPC · JPL
148006	1997 HY_{11}	—	April 30, 1997	Socorro	LINEAR	·	4.0 km	MPC · JPL
148007	1997 JL_{12}	—	May 3, 1997	La Silla	E. W. Elst	·	2.4 km	MPC · JPL
148008	1997 JS_{17}	—	May 3, 1997	La Silla	E. W. Elst	·	1.3 km	MPC · JPL
148009	1997 NW	—	July 3, 1997	Dynic	A. Sugie	T_{j} (2.99) · EUP	8.5 km	MPC · JPL
148010	1997 SK_{31}	—	September 28, 1997	Kitt Peak	Spacewatch	(5)	1.9 km	MPC · JPL
148011	1997 TE_{9}	—	October 2, 1997	Kitt Peak	Spacewatch	·	2.8 km	MPC · JPL
148012	1997 TT_{18}	—	October 6, 1997	Xinglong	SCAP	EUN	2.4 km	MPC · JPL
148013	1997 US_{20}	—	October 21, 1997	Xinglong	SCAP	·	1.6 km	MPC · JPL
148014	1997 VX_{1}	—	November 5, 1997	Prescott	P. G. Comba	·	3.9 km	MPC · JPL
148015	1997 WW_{5}	—	November 23, 1997	Kitt Peak	Spacewatch	·	2.4 km	MPC · JPL
148016	1997 WR_{24}	—	November 28, 1997	Kitt Peak	Spacewatch	·	1.7 km	MPC · JPL
148017	1997 WU_{30}	—	November 29, 1997	Socorro	LINEAR	·	3.4 km	MPC · JPL
148018	1997 YQ_{15}	—	December 29, 1997	Kitt Peak	Spacewatch	·	3.6 km	MPC · JPL
148019	1997 YW_{19}	—	December 31, 1997	Socorro	LINEAR	·	5.6 km	MPC · JPL
148020	1998 AW_{3}	—	January 2, 1998	Kitt Peak	Spacewatch	·	2.5 km	MPC · JPL
148021	1998 CT	—	February 4, 1998	Modra	A. Galád, Pravda, A.	·	2.7 km	MPC · JPL
148022	1998 CH_{4}	—	February 6, 1998	La Silla	E. W. Elst	(159)	5.4 km	MPC · JPL
148023	1998 DY_{1}	—	February 20, 1998	Farra d'Isonzo	Farra d'Isonzo	·	4.0 km	MPC · JPL
148024	1998 DX_{18}	—	February 24, 1998	Kitt Peak	Spacewatch	·	2.9 km	MPC · JPL
148025	1998 DT_{37}	—	February 24, 1998	Kitt Peak	Spacewatch	·	2.8 km	MPC · JPL
148026	1998 DZ_{37}	—	February 26, 1998	Haleakala	NEAT	·	4.1 km	MPC · JPL
148027	1998 EH_{9}	—	March 8, 1998	Xinglong	SCAP	·	4.8 km	MPC · JPL
148028	1998 EY_{12}	—	March 1, 1998	La Silla	E. W. Elst	NAE	6.6 km	MPC · JPL
148029	1998 FQ_{7}	—	March 20, 1998	Kitt Peak	Spacewatch	·	2.5 km	MPC · JPL
148030	1998 FF_{13}	—	March 26, 1998	Haleakala	NEAT	·	6.3 km	MPC · JPL
148031	1998 FG_{101}	—	March 31, 1998	Socorro	LINEAR	·	5.6 km	MPC · JPL
148032	1998 FQ_{142}	—	March 29, 1998	Socorro	LINEAR	(13314)	3.7 km	MPC · JPL
148033	1998 MF_{41}	—	June 28, 1998	La Silla	E. W. Elst	·	1.4 km	MPC · JPL
148034	1998 QQ_{25}	—	August 17, 1998	Socorro	LINEAR	·	1.2 km	MPC · JPL
148035	1998 QY_{44}	—	August 17, 1998	Socorro	LINEAR	·	2.0 km	MPC · JPL
148036	1998 RE_{42}	—	September 14, 1998	Socorro	LINEAR	·	1.7 km	MPC · JPL
148037	1998 RG_{43}	—	September 14, 1998	Socorro	LINEAR	NYS	2.2 km	MPC · JPL
148038	1998 RV_{46}	—	September 14, 1998	Socorro	LINEAR	·	3.3 km	MPC · JPL
148039	1998 RL_{52}	—	September 14, 1998	Socorro	LINEAR	·	1.9 km	MPC · JPL
148040	1998 RH_{53}	—	September 14, 1998	Socorro	LINEAR	·	1.4 km	MPC · JPL
148041	1998 RN_{59}	—	September 14, 1998	Socorro	LINEAR	·	2.1 km	MPC · JPL
148042	1998 RP_{79}	—	September 14, 1998	Socorro	LINEAR	MAR	2.9 km	MPC · JPL
148043	1998 SF_{25}	—	September 22, 1998	Anderson Mesa	LONEOS	·	2.4 km	MPC · JPL
148044	1998 SL_{34}	—	September 26, 1998	Socorro	LINEAR	EUN	2.0 km	MPC · JPL
148045	1998 SX_{64}	—	September 20, 1998	La Silla	E. W. Elst	·	3.1 km	MPC · JPL
148046	1998 SF_{70}	—	September 21, 1998	Socorro	LINEAR	PHO	2.0 km	MPC · JPL
148047	1998 SN_{72}	—	September 21, 1998	La Silla	E. W. Elst	NYS	2.5 km	MPC · JPL
148048	1998 ST_{87}	—	September 26, 1998	Socorro	LINEAR	V	1.2 km	MPC · JPL
148049	1998 SU_{91}	—	September 26, 1998	Socorro	LINEAR	·	3.9 km	MPC · JPL
148050	1998 SG_{103}	—	September 26, 1998	Socorro	LINEAR	·	1.9 km	MPC · JPL
148051	1998 SF_{118}	—	September 26, 1998	Socorro	LINEAR	·	1.7 km	MPC · JPL
148052	1998 SU_{119}	—	September 26, 1998	Socorro	LINEAR	·	4.2 km	MPC · JPL
148053	1998 SU_{130}	—	September 26, 1998	Socorro	LINEAR	·	3.1 km	MPC · JPL
148054	1998 SB_{137}	—	September 26, 1998	Socorro	LINEAR	·	1.6 km	MPC · JPL
148055	1998 SF_{139}	—	September 26, 1998	Socorro	LINEAR	·	2.0 km	MPC · JPL
148056	1998 SF_{152}	—	September 26, 1998	Socorro	LINEAR	MAS	1.3 km	MPC · JPL
148057	1998 ST_{154}	—	September 26, 1998	Socorro	LINEAR	·	1.6 km	MPC · JPL
148058	1998 SX_{167}	—	September 17, 1998	Anderson Mesa	LONEOS	·	1.6 km	MPC · JPL
148059	1998 SN_{168}	—	September 17, 1998	Anderson Mesa	LONEOS	·	1.4 km	MPC · JPL
148060	1998 TO_{11}	—	October 13, 1998	Kitt Peak	Spacewatch	T_{j} (2.99) · 3:2	5.8 km	MPC · JPL
148061	1998 TB_{28}	—	October 15, 1998	Kitt Peak	Spacewatch	NYS	1.3 km	MPC · JPL
148062	1998 UB_{5}	—	October 22, 1998	Caussols	ODAS	·	1.7 km	MPC · JPL
148063	1998 UA_{20}	—	October 28, 1998	Višnjan Observatory	K. Korlević	·	2.0 km	MPC · JPL
148064	1998 UW_{24}	—	October 19, 1998	Anderson Mesa	LONEOS	·	1.7 km	MPC · JPL
148065	1998 UH_{29}	—	October 18, 1998	La Silla	E. W. Elst	·	2.5 km	MPC · JPL
148066	1998 VL_{17}	—	November 10, 1998	Socorro	LINEAR	NYS	2.3 km	MPC · JPL
148067	1998 VN_{20}	—	November 10, 1998	Socorro	LINEAR	·	2.2 km	MPC · JPL
148068	1998 VE_{21}	—	November 10, 1998	Socorro	LINEAR	·	2.1 km	MPC · JPL
148069	1998 VP_{43}	—	November 15, 1998	Kitt Peak	Spacewatch	·	2.0 km	MPC · JPL
148070	1998 VY_{49}	—	November 11, 1998	Socorro	LINEAR	·	1.7 km	MPC · JPL
148071	1998 VU_{56}	—	November 11, 1998	Anderson Mesa	LONEOS	NYS	1.6 km	MPC · JPL
148072	1998 WR_{16}	—	November 21, 1998	Socorro	LINEAR	·	2.0 km	MPC · JPL
148073	1998 WU_{29}	—	November 23, 1998	Kitt Peak	Spacewatch	·	2.3 km	MPC · JPL
148074	1998 WR_{32}	—	November 19, 1998	Anderson Mesa	LONEOS	·	1.9 km	MPC · JPL
148075	1998 WB_{37}	—	November 21, 1998	Kitt Peak	Spacewatch	NYS	1.9 km	MPC · JPL
148076	1998 XJ_{1}	—	December 7, 1998	Caussols	ODAS	·	1.7 km	MPC · JPL
148077	1998 XJ_{10}	—	December 8, 1998	Caussols	ODAS	·	2.0 km	MPC · JPL
148078	1998 XS_{10}	—	December 15, 1998	Caussols	ODAS	(5)	2.2 km	MPC · JPL
148079	1999 AZ_{13}	—	January 8, 1999	Kitt Peak	Spacewatch	·	1.7 km	MPC · JPL
148080	1999 AQ_{17}	—	January 11, 1999	Kitt Peak	Spacewatch	·	3.2 km	MPC · JPL
148081 Sunjiadong	1999 AW_{23}	Sunjiadong	January 11, 1999	Xinglong	SCAP	·	3.0 km	MPC · JPL
148082	1999 BH_{15}	—	January 26, 1999	Višnjan Observatory	K. Korlević	EUN	2.4 km	MPC · JPL
148083	1999 CZ_{11}	—	February 12, 1999	Socorro	LINEAR	H	1.2 km	MPC · JPL
148084	1999 CN_{24}	—	February 10, 1999	Socorro	LINEAR	·	2.7 km	MPC · JPL
148085	1999 CW_{46}	—	February 10, 1999	Socorro	LINEAR	·	1.9 km	MPC · JPL
148086	1999 CC_{92}	—	February 10, 1999	Socorro	LINEAR	(5)	2.2 km	MPC · JPL
148087	1999 CS_{94}	—	February 10, 1999	Socorro	LINEAR	(5)	2.3 km	MPC · JPL
148088	1999 CE_{100}	—	February 10, 1999	Socorro	LINEAR	·	2.0 km	MPC · JPL
148089	1999 CB_{114}	—	February 12, 1999	Socorro	LINEAR	·	4.7 km	MPC · JPL
148090	1999 CQ_{120}	—	February 11, 1999	Socorro	LINEAR	·	4.2 km	MPC · JPL
148091	1999 CC_{153}	—	February 13, 1999	Kitt Peak	Spacewatch	(5)	2.1 km	MPC · JPL
148092	1999 FW_{13}	—	March 19, 1999	Kitt Peak	Spacewatch	(5)	2.0 km	MPC · JPL
148093	1999 FZ_{33}	—	March 19, 1999	Socorro	LINEAR	·	4.3 km	MPC · JPL
148094	1999 GP_{6}	—	April 15, 1999	Wise	Wise	H	1.0 km	MPC · JPL
148095	1999 JF_{10}	—	May 8, 1999	Catalina	CSS	·	3.0 km	MPC · JPL
148096	1999 JF_{90}	—	May 12, 1999	Socorro	LINEAR	·	2.3 km	MPC · JPL
148097	1999 JM_{138}	—	May 15, 1999	Catalina	CSS	·	5.0 km	MPC · JPL
148098	1999 KR	—	May 16, 1999	Catalina	CSS	·	4.0 km	MPC · JPL
148099	1999 LN_{3}	—	June 8, 1999	Kitt Peak	Spacewatch	·	1.0 km	MPC · JPL
148100	1999 NM_{10}	—	July 13, 1999	Socorro	LINEAR	·	4.7 km	MPC · JPL

== 148101–148200 ==
back to top

Designation			Discovery			Properties		Ref
Permanent	Provisional	Named after	Date	Site	Discoverer(s)	Category	Diam.	Ref
148101	1999 RD_{33}	—	September 8, 1999	Prescott	P. G. Comba	EOS	3.8 km	MPC · JPL
148102	1999 RW_{47}	—	September 7, 1999	Socorro	LINEAR	EUP	5.5 km	MPC · JPL
148103	1999 RO_{57}	—	September 7, 1999	Socorro	LINEAR	slow	1.5 km	MPC · JPL
148104	1999 RX_{68}	—	September 7, 1999	Socorro	LINEAR	·	4.6 km	MPC · JPL
148105	1999 RU_{102}	—	September 8, 1999	Socorro	LINEAR	·	4.0 km	MPC · JPL
148106	1999 RV_{102}	—	September 8, 1999	Socorro	LINEAR	·	4.0 km	MPC · JPL
148107	1999 RR_{144}	—	September 9, 1999	Socorro	LINEAR	EOS	4.1 km	MPC · JPL
148108	1999 RJ_{164}	—	September 9, 1999	Socorro	LINEAR	·	3.7 km	MPC · JPL
148109	1999 RC_{167}	—	September 9, 1999	Socorro	LINEAR	·	1.3 km	MPC · JPL
148110	1999 RQ_{200}	—	September 8, 1999	Socorro	LINEAR	·	6.6 km	MPC · JPL
148111	1999 RF_{209}	—	September 8, 1999	Socorro	LINEAR	(2076)	1.5 km	MPC · JPL
148112	1999 RA_{216}	—	September 8, 1999	Mauna Kea	C. A. Trujillo, D. C. Jewitt, J. X. Luu	cubewano (cold)	131 km	MPC · JPL
148113	1999 RW_{252}	—	September 8, 1999	Socorro	LINEAR	EOS	3.4 km	MPC · JPL
148114	1999 SM_{12}	—	September 30, 1999	Anderson Mesa	LONEOS	·	7.2 km	MPC · JPL
148115	1999 TA_{25}	—	October 2, 1999	Socorro	LINEAR	·	990 m	MPC · JPL
148116	1999 TD_{30}	—	October 4, 1999	Socorro	LINEAR	·	1.4 km	MPC · JPL
148117	1999 TX_{52}	—	October 6, 1999	Kitt Peak	Spacewatch	·	4.3 km	MPC · JPL
148118	1999 TQ_{65}	—	October 8, 1999	Kitt Peak	Spacewatch	·	3.4 km	MPC · JPL
148119	1999 TV_{81}	—	October 12, 1999	Kitt Peak	Spacewatch	·	720 m	MPC · JPL
148120	1999 TK_{85}	—	October 14, 1999	Kitt Peak	Spacewatch	·	1.6 km	MPC · JPL
148121	1999 TL_{100}	—	October 2, 1999	Socorro	LINEAR	·	1.2 km	MPC · JPL
148122	1999 TC_{140}	—	October 6, 1999	Socorro	LINEAR	·	1.1 km	MPC · JPL
148123	1999 TF_{161}	—	October 9, 1999	Socorro	LINEAR	·	1.0 km	MPC · JPL
148124	1999 TK_{165}	—	October 10, 1999	Socorro	LINEAR	EOS	4.2 km	MPC · JPL
148125	1999 TV_{166}	—	October 10, 1999	Socorro	LINEAR	·	4.6 km	MPC · JPL
148126	1999 TM_{185}	—	October 12, 1999	Socorro	LINEAR	·	1.2 km	MPC · JPL
148127	1999 TM_{186}	—	October 12, 1999	Socorro	LINEAR	EOS	4.1 km	MPC · JPL
148128	1999 TM_{191}	—	October 12, 1999	Socorro	LINEAR	·	1.7 km	MPC · JPL
148129	1999 TK_{192}	—	October 12, 1999	Socorro	LINEAR	·	1.1 km	MPC · JPL
148130	1999 TB_{203}	—	October 13, 1999	Socorro	LINEAR	·	4.3 km	MPC · JPL
148131	1999 TO_{250}	—	October 9, 1999	Catalina	CSS	·	4.5 km	MPC · JPL
148132	1999 TW_{256}	—	October 9, 1999	Socorro	LINEAR	HYG	6.0 km	MPC · JPL
148133	1999 TO_{258}	—	October 9, 1999	Socorro	LINEAR	·	4.3 km	MPC · JPL
148134	1999 TQ_{270}	—	October 3, 1999	Socorro	LINEAR	·	1.3 km	MPC · JPL
148135	1999 TY_{272}	—	October 3, 1999	Socorro	LINEAR	·	1.4 km	MPC · JPL
148136	1999 TX_{287}	—	October 10, 1999	Socorro	LINEAR	·	1.1 km	MPC · JPL
148137	1999 TP_{311}	—	October 7, 1999	Catalina	CSS	·	3.3 km	MPC · JPL
148138	1999 TW_{312}	—	October 8, 1999	Catalina	CSS	·	8.4 km	MPC · JPL
148139	1999 VT_{55}	—	November 4, 1999	Socorro	LINEAR	·	1 km	MPC · JPL
148140	1999 VH_{106}	—	November 9, 1999	Socorro	LINEAR	·	4.4 km	MPC · JPL
148141	1999 VC_{113}	—	November 9, 1999	Socorro	LINEAR	·	1.6 km	MPC · JPL
148142	1999 VY_{134}	—	November 10, 1999	Kitt Peak	Spacewatch	THM	4.1 km	MPC · JPL
148143	1999 VN_{142}	—	November 10, 1999	Kitt Peak	Spacewatch	·	810 m	MPC · JPL
148144	1999 VS_{146}	—	November 12, 1999	Socorro	LINEAR	MAS	710 m	MPC · JPL
148145	1999 VW_{165}	—	November 14, 1999	Socorro	LINEAR	·	1.1 km	MPC · JPL
148146	1999 VB_{169}	—	November 14, 1999	Socorro	LINEAR	·	1.2 km	MPC · JPL
148147	1999 XZ_{28}	—	December 6, 1999	Socorro	LINEAR	·	1.3 km	MPC · JPL
148148	1999 XE_{50}	—	December 7, 1999	Socorro	LINEAR	·	1.2 km	MPC · JPL
148149	1999 XU_{52}	—	December 7, 1999	Socorro	LINEAR	BAP	1.6 km	MPC · JPL
148150	1999 XK_{79}	—	December 7, 1999	Socorro	LINEAR	NYS	1.4 km	MPC · JPL
148151	1999 XE_{119}	—	December 5, 1999	Catalina	CSS	·	1.5 km	MPC · JPL
148152	1999 XC_{131}	—	December 12, 1999	Socorro	LINEAR	·	1.4 km	MPC · JPL
148153	1999 XZ_{131}	—	December 12, 1999	Socorro	LINEAR	·	1.5 km	MPC · JPL
148154	1999 XA_{134}	—	December 12, 1999	Socorro	LINEAR	·	2.6 km	MPC · JPL
148155	1999 XL_{135}	—	December 8, 1999	Socorro	LINEAR	·	1.4 km	MPC · JPL
148156	1999 XP_{141}	—	December 8, 1999	Socorro	LINEAR	PHO	2.8 km	MPC · JPL
148157	1999 XV_{142}	—	December 13, 1999	Socorro	LINEAR	PHO	2.4 km	MPC · JPL
148158	1999 XB_{153}	—	December 7, 1999	Socorro	LINEAR	·	2.0 km	MPC · JPL
148159	1999 XC_{153}	—	December 7, 1999	Socorro	LINEAR	·	1.1 km	MPC · JPL
148160	1999 XQ_{160}	—	December 8, 1999	Socorro	LINEAR	·	1.4 km	MPC · JPL
148161	1999 XH_{172}	—	December 10, 1999	Socorro	LINEAR	·	1.0 km	MPC · JPL
148162	1999 XC_{186}	—	December 12, 1999	Socorro	LINEAR	V	1.0 km	MPC · JPL
148163	1999 XV_{194}	—	December 12, 1999	Socorro	LINEAR	·	1.9 km	MPC · JPL
148164	1999 XW_{194}	—	December 12, 1999	Socorro	LINEAR	·	1.4 km	MPC · JPL
148165	1999 XK_{228}	—	December 14, 1999	Kitt Peak	Spacewatch	(2076)	1.2 km	MPC · JPL
148166	1999 XN_{229}	—	December 7, 1999	Catalina	CSS	·	1.1 km	MPC · JPL
148167	1999 XU_{251}	—	December 9, 1999	Kitt Peak	Spacewatch	THM	6.0 km	MPC · JPL
148168	1999 XH_{252}	—	December 9, 1999	Kitt Peak	Spacewatch	·	1.6 km	MPC · JPL
148169	1999 XQ_{257}	—	December 7, 1999	Socorro	LINEAR	·	1.4 km	MPC · JPL
148170	1999 YE_{1}	—	December 17, 1999	Socorro	LINEAR	PHO	7.1 km	MPC · JPL
148171	1999 YC_{3}	—	December 17, 1999	Socorro	LINEAR	·	1.7 km	MPC · JPL
148172	1999 YZ_{25}	—	December 31, 1999	Anderson Mesa	LONEOS	·	1.7 km	MPC · JPL
148173	2000 AT	—	January 2, 2000	Kitt Peak	Spacewatch	NYS	2.5 km	MPC · JPL
148174	2000 AC_{36}	—	January 3, 2000	Socorro	LINEAR	·	1.9 km	MPC · JPL
148175	2000 AE_{36}	—	January 3, 2000	Socorro	LINEAR	·	1.4 km	MPC · JPL
148176	2000 AL_{46}	—	January 3, 2000	Socorro	LINEAR	·	1.4 km	MPC · JPL
148177	2000 AR_{62}	—	January 4, 2000	Socorro	LINEAR	·	1.3 km	MPC · JPL
148178	2000 AO_{73}	—	January 5, 2000	Socorro	LINEAR	·	1.4 km	MPC · JPL
148179	2000 AY_{79}	—	January 5, 2000	Socorro	LINEAR	·	1.3 km	MPC · JPL
148180	2000 AD_{114}	—	January 5, 2000	Socorro	LINEAR	·	2.3 km	MPC · JPL
148181	2000 AQ_{122}	—	January 5, 2000	Socorro	LINEAR	·	1.4 km	MPC · JPL
148182	2000 AF_{161}	—	January 3, 2000	Socorro	LINEAR	·	2.4 km	MPC · JPL
148183	2000 AG_{208}	—	January 4, 2000	Kitt Peak	Spacewatch	·	5.6 km	MPC · JPL
148184	2000 AH_{212}	—	January 5, 2000	Kitt Peak	Spacewatch	V	1.6 km	MPC · JPL
148185	2000 AT_{223}	—	January 9, 2000	Kitt Peak	Spacewatch	·	1.0 km	MPC · JPL
148186	2000 BG	—	January 16, 2000	Eskridge	G. Hug, G. Bell	MAS	900 m	MPC · JPL
148187	2000 BP_{18}	—	January 30, 2000	Socorro	LINEAR	·	1.9 km	MPC · JPL
148188	2000 BF_{20}	—	January 26, 2000	Kitt Peak	Spacewatch	V	1.0 km	MPC · JPL
148189	2000 BE_{22}	—	January 30, 2000	Kitt Peak	Spacewatch	NYS	1.8 km	MPC · JPL
148190	2000 BT_{23}	—	January 29, 2000	Socorro	LINEAR	·	1.5 km	MPC · JPL
148191	2000 BK_{24}	—	January 29, 2000	Socorro	LINEAR	·	1.4 km	MPC · JPL
148192	2000 BQ_{34}	—	January 30, 2000	Catalina	CSS	·	1.7 km	MPC · JPL
148193	2000 BQ_{45}	—	January 28, 2000	Kitt Peak	Spacewatch	·	1.2 km	MPC · JPL
148194	2000 BD_{46}	—	January 28, 2000	Kitt Peak	Spacewatch	·	1.7 km	MPC · JPL
148195	2000 CG_{7}	—	February 2, 2000	Socorro	LINEAR	·	1.3 km	MPC · JPL
148196	2000 CR_{37}	—	February 3, 2000	Socorro	LINEAR	·	1.6 km	MPC · JPL
148197	2000 CQ_{38}	—	February 3, 2000	Socorro	LINEAR	·	2.0 km	MPC · JPL
148198	2000 CR_{38}	—	February 3, 2000	Socorro	LINEAR	·	1.3 km	MPC · JPL
148199	2000 CE_{40}	—	February 4, 2000	Socorro	LINEAR	·	1.9 km	MPC · JPL
148200	2000 CH_{69}	—	February 1, 2000	Kitt Peak	Spacewatch	·	1.6 km	MPC · JPL

== 148201–148300 ==
back to top

Designation			Discovery			Properties		Ref
Permanent	Provisional	Named after	Date	Site	Discoverer(s)	Category	Diam.	Ref
148201	2000 CD_{80}	—	February 8, 2000	Kitt Peak	Spacewatch	·	1.7 km	MPC · JPL
148202	2000 CN_{80}	—	February 6, 2000	Socorro	LINEAR	PHO	3.1 km	MPC · JPL
148203	2000 CW_{88}	—	February 4, 2000	Socorro	LINEAR	·	2.3 km	MPC · JPL
148204	2000 CN_{90}	—	February 6, 2000	Socorro	LINEAR	NYS	1.6 km	MPC · JPL
148205	2000 CZ_{93}	—	February 8, 2000	Socorro	LINEAR	ERI	3.2 km	MPC · JPL
148206	2000 CL_{97}	—	February 13, 2000	San Marcello	L. Tesi, M. Tombelli	·	1.6 km	MPC · JPL
148207	2000 CM_{100}	—	February 10, 2000	Kitt Peak	Spacewatch	NYS ·	2.5 km	MPC · JPL
148208	2000 CD_{101}	—	February 12, 2000	Kitt Peak	Spacewatch	·	1.3 km	MPC · JPL
148209	2000 CR_{105}	—	February 6, 2000	Kitt Peak	M. W. Buie	SDO	223 km	MPC · JPL
148210	2000 CR_{111}	—	February 6, 2000	Catalina	CSS	NYS	1.4 km	MPC · JPL
148211	2000 CO_{116}	—	February 3, 2000	Socorro	LINEAR	·	3.8 km	MPC · JPL
148212	2000 CR_{140}	—	February 6, 2000	Kitt Peak	Spacewatch	·	1.3 km	MPC · JPL
148213	2000 DU_{2}	—	February 27, 2000	Kitt Peak	Spacewatch	·	980 m	MPC · JPL
148214	2000 DA_{21}	—	February 29, 2000	Socorro	LINEAR	·	1.7 km	MPC · JPL
148215	2000 DE_{28}	—	February 29, 2000	Socorro	LINEAR	·	2.1 km	MPC · JPL
148216	2000 DM_{30}	—	February 29, 2000	Socorro	LINEAR	·	1.9 km	MPC · JPL
148217	2000 DB_{33}	—	February 29, 2000	Socorro	LINEAR	·	1.2 km	MPC · JPL
148218	2000 DM_{37}	—	February 29, 2000	Socorro	LINEAR	·	2.2 km	MPC · JPL
148219	2000 DP_{41}	—	February 29, 2000	Socorro	LINEAR	ERI	3.3 km	MPC · JPL
148220	2000 DB_{47}	—	February 29, 2000	Socorro	LINEAR	NYS	1.3 km	MPC · JPL
148221	2000 DO_{51}	—	February 29, 2000	Socorro	LINEAR	·	1.5 km	MPC · JPL
148222	2000 DP_{53}	—	February 29, 2000	Socorro	LINEAR	·	2.0 km	MPC · JPL
148223	2000 DQ_{60}	—	February 29, 2000	Socorro	LINEAR	·	1.4 km	MPC · JPL
148224	2000 DV_{61}	—	February 29, 2000	Socorro	LINEAR	·	2.0 km	MPC · JPL
148225	2000 DB_{78}	—	February 29, 2000	Socorro	LINEAR	·	2.1 km	MPC · JPL
148226	2000 DO_{84}	—	February 29, 2000	Socorro	LINEAR	(2076)	1.9 km	MPC · JPL
148227	2000 DP_{99}	—	February 29, 2000	Socorro	LINEAR	3:2	7.9 km	MPC · JPL
148228	2000 DP_{101}	—	February 29, 2000	Socorro	LINEAR	·	1.7 km	MPC · JPL
148229	2000 DN_{102}	—	February 29, 2000	Socorro	LINEAR	·	1.9 km	MPC · JPL
148230	2000 DF_{106}	—	February 29, 2000	Socorro	LINEAR	·	1.6 km	MPC · JPL
148231	2000 DG_{108}	—	February 28, 2000	Socorro	LINEAR	NYS	1.9 km	MPC · JPL
148232	2000 DU_{109}	—	February 29, 2000	Socorro	LINEAR	NYS	1.5 km	MPC · JPL
148233	2000 DV_{109}	—	February 29, 2000	Socorro	LINEAR	ERI	2.9 km	MPC · JPL
148234	2000 EW_{5}	—	March 2, 2000	Kitt Peak	Spacewatch	3:2 · SHU	9.8 km	MPC · JPL
148235	2000 EC_{6}	—	March 2, 2000	Kitt Peak	Spacewatch	MAS	960 m	MPC · JPL
148236	2000 EC_{9}	—	March 3, 2000	Socorro	LINEAR	·	2.1 km	MPC · JPL
148237	2000 EX_{9}	—	March 3, 2000	Socorro	LINEAR	·	1.3 km	MPC · JPL
148238	2000 EA_{19}	—	March 5, 2000	Socorro	LINEAR	·	2.4 km	MPC · JPL
148239	2000 EH_{28}	—	March 4, 2000	Socorro	LINEAR	·	2.5 km	MPC · JPL
148240	2000 EA_{41}	—	March 8, 2000	Socorro	LINEAR	·	2.1 km	MPC · JPL
148241	2000 EP_{42}	—	March 8, 2000	Socorro	LINEAR	·	1.8 km	MPC · JPL
148242	2000 EN_{58}	—	March 8, 2000	Socorro	LINEAR	·	2.0 km	MPC · JPL
148243	2000 EX_{58}	—	March 9, 2000	Socorro	LINEAR	·	1.8 km	MPC · JPL
148244	2000 EW_{63}	—	March 10, 2000	Socorro	LINEAR	·	1.6 km	MPC · JPL
148245	2000 EG_{70}	—	March 10, 2000	Socorro	LINEAR	MAS	1.2 km	MPC · JPL
148246	2000 EK_{109}	—	March 8, 2000	Haleakala	NEAT	·	3.3 km	MPC · JPL
148247	2000 EA_{124}	—	March 11, 2000	Anderson Mesa	LONEOS	·	2.8 km	MPC · JPL
148248	2000 EJ_{124}	—	March 11, 2000	Anderson Mesa	LONEOS	·	2.5 km	MPC · JPL
148249	2000 EO_{125}	—	March 11, 2000	Anderson Mesa	LONEOS	NYS	1.7 km	MPC · JPL
148250	2000 EC_{127}	—	March 11, 2000	Anderson Mesa	LONEOS	·	2.1 km	MPC · JPL
148251	2000 EA_{145}	—	March 3, 2000	Catalina	CSS	·	2.1 km	MPC · JPL
148252	2000 ER_{162}	—	March 3, 2000	Socorro	LINEAR	V	1.2 km	MPC · JPL
148253	2000 EC_{178}	—	March 4, 2000	Socorro	LINEAR	·	2.1 km	MPC · JPL
148254	2000 EL_{198}	—	March 1, 2000	Catalina	CSS	ERI	2.7 km	MPC · JPL
148255	2000 EF_{201}	—	March 5, 2000	Xinglong	SCAP	NYS	1.5 km	MPC · JPL
148256	2000 FL_{16}	—	March 28, 2000	Socorro	LINEAR	·	2.2 km	MPC · JPL
148257	2000 FS_{17}	—	March 29, 2000	Socorro	LINEAR	·	2.4 km	MPC · JPL
148258	2000 FQ_{20}	—	March 29, 2000	Socorro	LINEAR	ERI	2.6 km	MPC · JPL
148259	2000 FB_{22}	—	March 29, 2000	Socorro	LINEAR	ERI	4.1 km	MPC · JPL
148260	2000 FA_{24}	—	March 29, 2000	Socorro	LINEAR	·	2.5 km	MPC · JPL
148261	2000 FV_{31}	—	March 29, 2000	Socorro	LINEAR	·	4.8 km	MPC · JPL
148262	2000 FT_{33}	—	March 29, 2000	Socorro	LINEAR	·	1.8 km	MPC · JPL
148263	2000 FM_{34}	—	March 29, 2000	Socorro	LINEAR	·	3.1 km	MPC · JPL
148264	2000 FS_{34}	—	March 29, 2000	Socorro	LINEAR	PHO	1.8 km	MPC · JPL
148265	2000 FQ_{37}	—	March 29, 2000	Socorro	LINEAR	·	2.4 km	MPC · JPL
148266	2000 FQ_{39}	—	March 29, 2000	Socorro	LINEAR	NYS	2.0 km	MPC · JPL
148267	2000 FH_{43}	—	March 29, 2000	Socorro	LINEAR	·	1.7 km	MPC · JPL
148268	2000 FN_{57}	—	March 26, 2000	Anderson Mesa	LONEOS	·	1.8 km	MPC · JPL
148269	2000 FX_{66}	—	March 25, 2000	Kitt Peak	Spacewatch	NYS	1.2 km	MPC · JPL
148270	2000 GM_{6}	—	April 4, 2000	Socorro	LINEAR	·	1.6 km	MPC · JPL
148271	2000 GF_{20}	—	April 5, 2000	Socorro	LINEAR	·	1.5 km	MPC · JPL
148272	2000 GL_{29}	—	April 5, 2000	Socorro	LINEAR	·	2.3 km	MPC · JPL
148273	2000 GB_{37}	—	April 5, 2000	Socorro	LINEAR	NYS	2.8 km	MPC · JPL
148274	2000 GS_{39}	—	April 5, 2000	Socorro	LINEAR	·	1.5 km	MPC · JPL
148275	2000 GB_{49}	—	April 5, 2000	Socorro	LINEAR	NYS	2.1 km	MPC · JPL
148276	2000 GL_{56}	—	April 5, 2000	Socorro	LINEAR	MAS	1.3 km	MPC · JPL
148277	2000 GV_{58}	—	April 5, 2000	Socorro	LINEAR	·	1.8 km	MPC · JPL
148278	2000 GW_{83}	—	April 3, 2000	Socorro	LINEAR	·	1.8 km	MPC · JPL
148279	2000 GF_{87}	—	April 4, 2000	Socorro	LINEAR	·	2.8 km	MPC · JPL
148280	2000 GG_{93}	—	April 5, 2000	Socorro	LINEAR	ADE	4.8 km	MPC · JPL
148281	2000 GT_{97}	—	April 7, 2000	Socorro	LINEAR	·	1.8 km	MPC · JPL
148282	2000 GO_{107}	—	April 7, 2000	Socorro	LINEAR	NYS	2.2 km	MPC · JPL
148283	2000 GM_{134}	—	April 8, 2000	Socorro	LINEAR	·	2.1 km	MPC · JPL
148284	2000 GX_{157}	—	April 7, 2000	Anderson Mesa	LONEOS	·	1.5 km	MPC · JPL
148285	2000 GC_{158}	—	April 7, 2000	Anderson Mesa	LONEOS	NYS	1.9 km	MPC · JPL
148286	2000 GN_{164}	—	April 5, 2000	Socorro	LINEAR	·	1.6 km	MPC · JPL
148287	2000 GD_{172}	—	April 5, 2000	Anderson Mesa	LONEOS	NYS ·	2.8 km	MPC · JPL
148288	2000 GE_{172}	—	April 5, 2000	Anderson Mesa	LONEOS	·	1.7 km	MPC · JPL
148289	2000 GO_{173}	—	April 5, 2000	Anderson Mesa	LONEOS	·	1.9 km	MPC · JPL
148290	2000 HV_{2}	—	April 25, 2000	Kitt Peak	Spacewatch	(5)	2.5 km	MPC · JPL
148291	2000 HJ_{25}	—	April 24, 2000	Anderson Mesa	LONEOS	ERI	3.3 km	MPC · JPL
148292	2000 HB_{27}	—	April 27, 2000	Socorro	LINEAR	·	2.2 km	MPC · JPL
148293	2000 HM_{27}	—	April 28, 2000	Socorro	LINEAR	EUN	2.2 km	MPC · JPL
148294	2000 HQ_{34}	—	April 25, 2000	Anderson Mesa	LONEOS	·	2.3 km	MPC · JPL
148295	2000 HU_{51}	—	April 29, 2000	Socorro	LINEAR	·	1.9 km	MPC · JPL
148296	2000 HG_{67}	—	April 27, 2000	Anderson Mesa	LONEOS	EUN	1.9 km	MPC · JPL
148297	2000 HH_{72}	—	April 26, 2000	Anderson Mesa	LONEOS	MAS	1.1 km	MPC · JPL
148298	2000 HX_{74}	—	April 27, 2000	Socorro	LINEAR	·	2.2 km	MPC · JPL
148299	2000 HM_{77}	—	April 28, 2000	Anderson Mesa	LONEOS	·	3.6 km	MPC · JPL
148300	2000 HO_{97}	—	April 25, 2000	Kitt Peak	Spacewatch	NYS	2.0 km	MPC · JPL

== 148301–148400 ==
back to top

Designation			Discovery			Properties		Ref
Permanent	Provisional	Named after	Date	Site	Discoverer(s)	Category	Diam.	Ref
148301	2000 JJ_{2}	—	May 3, 2000	Socorro	LINEAR	PHO	1.6 km	MPC · JPL
148302	2000 JR_{62}	—	May 9, 2000	Socorro	LINEAR	·	3.1 km	MPC · JPL
148303	2000 KQ_{14}	—	May 28, 2000	Socorro	LINEAR	·	2.0 km	MPC · JPL
148304	2000 KF_{41}	—	May 31, 2000	Prescott	P. G. Comba	·	1.8 km	MPC · JPL
148305	2000 KD_{55}	—	May 27, 2000	Socorro	LINEAR	V	1.6 km	MPC · JPL
148306	2000 KR_{68}	—	May 29, 2000	Kitt Peak	Spacewatch	·	2.0 km	MPC · JPL
148307	2000 LR_{33}	—	June 4, 2000	Haleakala	NEAT	·	3.9 km	MPC · JPL
148308	2000 LF_{36}	—	June 1, 2000	Haleakala	NEAT	·	2.1 km	MPC · JPL
148309	2000 NA_{4}	—	July 3, 2000	Kitt Peak	Spacewatch	·	2.7 km	MPC · JPL
148310	2000 NN_{4}	—	July 3, 2000	Kitt Peak	Spacewatch	(5)	3.9 km	MPC · JPL
148311	2000 NE_{22}	—	July 7, 2000	Socorro	LINEAR	·	3.1 km	MPC · JPL
148312	2000 OP_{1}	—	July 23, 2000	Socorro	LINEAR	·	5.4 km	MPC · JPL
148313	2000 OZ_{22}	—	July 23, 2000	Socorro	LINEAR	·	3.5 km	MPC · JPL
148314	2000 OH_{52}	—	July 24, 2000	Anderson Mesa	LONEOS	·	3.9 km	MPC · JPL
148315	2000 PU_{6}	—	August 4, 2000	Socorro	LINEAR	H	1.2 km	MPC · JPL
148316	2000 PL_{18}	—	August 1, 2000	Socorro	LINEAR	H	1.0 km	MPC · JPL
148317	2000 QX_{12}	—	August 24, 2000	Socorro	LINEAR	·	3.3 km	MPC · JPL
148318	2000 QK_{13}	—	August 24, 2000	Socorro	LINEAR	·	4.4 km	MPC · JPL
148319	2000 QO_{32}	—	August 26, 2000	Socorro	LINEAR	·	4.1 km	MPC · JPL
148320	2000 QV_{47}	—	August 24, 2000	Socorro	LINEAR	·	3.0 km	MPC · JPL
148321	2000 QV_{52}	—	August 24, 2000	Socorro	LINEAR	(5)	2.3 km	MPC · JPL
148322	2000 QT_{57}	—	August 26, 2000	Socorro	LINEAR	GEF	2.1 km	MPC · JPL
148323	2000 QP_{64}	—	August 28, 2000	Socorro	LINEAR	·	3.5 km	MPC · JPL
148324	2000 QH_{81}	—	August 24, 2000	Socorro	LINEAR	·	2.5 km	MPC · JPL
148325	2000 QB_{83}	—	August 24, 2000	Socorro	LINEAR	·	3.2 km	MPC · JPL
148326	2000 QA_{95}	—	August 26, 2000	Socorro	LINEAR	·	3.8 km	MPC · JPL
148327	2000 QD_{99}	—	August 28, 2000	Socorro	LINEAR	·	3.2 km	MPC · JPL
148328	2000 QQ_{106}	—	August 29, 2000	Socorro	LINEAR	·	2.7 km	MPC · JPL
148329	2000 QO_{107}	—	August 29, 2000	Socorro	LINEAR	·	4.8 km	MPC · JPL
148330	2000 QG_{111}	—	August 24, 2000	Socorro	LINEAR	·	3.5 km	MPC · JPL
148331	2000 QO_{125}	—	August 31, 2000	Socorro	LINEAR	·	2.5 km	MPC · JPL
148332	2000 QY_{134}	—	August 26, 2000	Socorro	LINEAR	·	5.7 km	MPC · JPL
148333	2000 QA_{149}	—	August 30, 2000	Višnjan Observatory	K. Korlević	·	4.9 km	MPC · JPL
148334	2000 QB_{158}	—	August 31, 2000	Socorro	LINEAR	·	3.3 km	MPC · JPL
148335	2000 QJ_{159}	—	August 31, 2000	Socorro	LINEAR	·	4.3 km	MPC · JPL
148336	2000 QP_{166}	—	August 31, 2000	Socorro	LINEAR	·	3.3 km	MPC · JPL
148337	2000 QM_{167}	—	August 31, 2000	Socorro	LINEAR	GEF	2.2 km	MPC · JPL
148338	2000 QQ_{167}	—	August 31, 2000	Socorro	LINEAR	·	3.3 km	MPC · JPL
148339	2000 QG_{182}	—	August 31, 2000	Socorro	LINEAR	GEF	2.0 km	MPC · JPL
148340	2000 QN_{202}	—	August 29, 2000	Socorro	LINEAR	·	3.4 km	MPC · JPL
148341	2000 QF_{203}	—	August 29, 2000	Socorro	LINEAR	·	3.4 km	MPC · JPL
148342 Carverbierson	2000 QJ_{242}	Carverbierson	August 27, 2000	Cerro Tololo	M. W. Buie	·	2.9 km	MPC · JPL
148343	2000 RK_{5}	—	September 1, 2000	Socorro	LINEAR	H	1.2 km	MPC · JPL
148344	2000 RW_{18}	—	September 1, 2000	Socorro	LINEAR	·	8.6 km	MPC · JPL
148345	2000 RC_{19}	—	September 1, 2000	Socorro	LINEAR	·	4.2 km	MPC · JPL
148346	2000 RL_{23}	—	September 1, 2000	Socorro	LINEAR	·	4.7 km	MPC · JPL
148347	2000 RC_{24}	—	September 1, 2000	Socorro	LINEAR	·	5.3 km	MPC · JPL
148348	2000 RL_{24}	—	September 1, 2000	Socorro	LINEAR	·	3.6 km	MPC · JPL
148349	2000 RF_{29}	—	September 1, 2000	Socorro	LINEAR	·	2.5 km	MPC · JPL
148350	2000 RN_{34}	—	September 1, 2000	Socorro	LINEAR	·	3.4 km	MPC · JPL
148351	2000 RH_{43}	—	September 3, 2000	Socorro	LINEAR	EUP	11 km	MPC · JPL
148352	2000 RH_{45}	—	September 3, 2000	Socorro	LINEAR	EUN	2.7 km	MPC · JPL
148353	2000 RE_{100}	—	September 5, 2000	Socorro	LINEAR	·	3.4 km	MPC · JPL
148354	2000 RV_{101}	—	September 5, 2000	Anderson Mesa	LONEOS	·	5.2 km	MPC · JPL
148355	2000 RA_{102}	—	September 5, 2000	Anderson Mesa	LONEOS	URS	6.1 km	MPC · JPL
148356	2000 SE_{9}	—	September 23, 2000	Socorro	LINEAR	H	1.1 km	MPC · JPL
148357	2000 ST_{17}	—	September 23, 2000	Socorro	LINEAR	·	5.2 km	MPC · JPL
148358	2000 SY_{18}	—	September 23, 2000	Socorro	LINEAR	·	2.8 km	MPC · JPL
148359	2000 SM_{20}	—	September 23, 2000	Socorro	LINEAR	·	4.4 km	MPC · JPL
148360	2000 SJ_{27}	—	September 23, 2000	Socorro	LINEAR	·	4.3 km	MPC · JPL
148361	2000 SG_{36}	—	September 24, 2000	Socorro	LINEAR	·	3.6 km	MPC · JPL
148362	2000 SG_{46}	—	September 22, 2000	Socorro	LINEAR	·	3.2 km	MPC · JPL
148363	2000 SX_{90}	—	September 22, 2000	Socorro	LINEAR	TIR	4.6 km	MPC · JPL
148364	2000 SN_{91}	—	September 23, 2000	Socorro	LINEAR	·	4.0 km	MPC · JPL
148365	2000 SP_{94}	—	September 23, 2000	Socorro	LINEAR	ADE	4.0 km	MPC · JPL
148366	2000 SM_{100}	—	September 23, 2000	Socorro	LINEAR	·	5.6 km	MPC · JPL
148367	2000 SS_{101}	—	September 24, 2000	Socorro	LINEAR	KOR	2.0 km	MPC · JPL
148368	2000 SO_{105}	—	September 24, 2000	Socorro	LINEAR	·	2.9 km	MPC · JPL
148369	2000 SW_{108}	—	September 24, 2000	Socorro	LINEAR	(21344)	3.0 km	MPC · JPL
148370	2000 SE_{119}	—	September 24, 2000	Socorro	LINEAR	EOS	3.4 km	MPC · JPL
148371	2000 SU_{129}	—	September 22, 2000	Socorro	LINEAR	·	8.4 km	MPC · JPL
148372	2000 ST_{137}	—	September 23, 2000	Socorro	LINEAR	·	2.5 km	MPC · JPL
148373	2000 SP_{165}	—	September 23, 2000	Socorro	LINEAR	·	4.6 km	MPC · JPL
148374	2000 SW_{174}	—	September 28, 2000	Socorro	LINEAR	·	4.3 km	MPC · JPL
148375	2000 SO_{184}	—	September 20, 2000	Haleakala	NEAT	·	3.8 km	MPC · JPL
148376	2000 SX_{195}	—	September 24, 2000	Socorro	LINEAR	THM	3.4 km	MPC · JPL
148377	2000 SN_{281}	—	September 23, 2000	Socorro	LINEAR	EOS	3.5 km	MPC · JPL
148378	2000 SP_{282}	—	September 23, 2000	Socorro	LINEAR	ELF	5.3 km	MPC · JPL
148379	2000 SQ_{294}	—	September 27, 2000	Socorro	LINEAR	·	4.0 km	MPC · JPL
148380	2000 SS_{307}	—	September 30, 2000	Socorro	LINEAR	TEL	2.3 km	MPC · JPL
148381	2000 SC_{309}	—	September 30, 2000	Socorro	LINEAR	EOS	4.1 km	MPC · JPL
148382	2000 SR_{318}	—	September 26, 2000	Socorro	LINEAR	·	8.2 km	MPC · JPL
148383	2000 SA_{352}	—	September 26, 2000	Anderson Mesa	LONEOS	AGN	1.9 km	MPC · JPL
148384 Dalcanton	2000 SV_{373}	Dalcanton	September 26, 2000	Apache Point	SDSS	VER	4.1 km	MPC · JPL
148385	2000 TG_{10}	—	October 1, 2000	Socorro	LINEAR	·	2.7 km	MPC · JPL
148386	2000 TM_{19}	—	October 1, 2000	Socorro	LINEAR	·	3.0 km	MPC · JPL
148387	2000 TS_{29}	—	October 4, 2000	Socorro	LINEAR	·	2.5 km	MPC · JPL
148388	2000 TU_{33}	—	October 1, 2000	Socorro	LINEAR	·	3.8 km	MPC · JPL
148389	2000 TN_{35}	—	October 6, 2000	Anderson Mesa	LONEOS	·	2.7 km	MPC · JPL
148390	2000 TU_{37}	—	October 1, 2000	Socorro	LINEAR	EUN · slow	2.9 km	MPC · JPL
148391	2000 TV_{61}	—	October 2, 2000	Anderson Mesa	LONEOS	·	4.4 km	MPC · JPL
148392	2000 TQ_{68}	—	October 5, 2000	Socorro	LINEAR	·	5.4 km	MPC · JPL
148393	2000 UV_{12}	—	October 25, 2000	Socorro	LINEAR	·	4.5 km	MPC · JPL
148394	2000 UU_{23}	—	October 24, 2000	Socorro	LINEAR	·	5.0 km	MPC · JPL
148395	2000 UL_{38}	—	October 24, 2000	Socorro	LINEAR	·	4.5 km	MPC · JPL
148396	2000 UJ_{43}	—	October 24, 2000	Socorro	LINEAR	·	5.0 km	MPC · JPL
148397	2000 UE_{55}	—	October 24, 2000	Socorro	LINEAR	·	5.6 km	MPC · JPL
148398	2000 UY_{61}	—	October 25, 2000	Socorro	LINEAR	EOS	3.1 km	MPC · JPL
148399	2000 UB_{78}	—	October 24, 2000	Socorro	LINEAR	·	6.1 km	MPC · JPL
148400	2000 UW_{80}	—	October 24, 2000	Socorro	LINEAR	·	4.2 km	MPC · JPL

== 148401–148500 ==
back to top

Designation			Discovery			Properties		Ref
Permanent	Provisional	Named after	Date	Site	Discoverer(s)	Category	Diam.	Ref
148401	2000 UF_{82}	—	October 25, 2000	Socorro	LINEAR	EOS	3.8 km	MPC · JPL
148402	2000 UO_{98}	—	October 25, 2000	Socorro	LINEAR	HYG	4.6 km	MPC · JPL
148403	2000 UU_{101}	—	October 25, 2000	Socorro	LINEAR	·	4.0 km	MPC · JPL
148404	2000 VS_{40}	—	November 1, 2000	Socorro	LINEAR	·	3.6 km	MPC · JPL
148405	2000 VJ_{41}	—	November 1, 2000	Socorro	LINEAR	·	2.5 km	MPC · JPL
148406	2000 VC_{54}	—	November 3, 2000	Socorro	LINEAR	EOS	4.0 km	MPC · JPL
148407	2000 WG_{8}	—	November 20, 2000	Socorro	LINEAR	·	4.5 km	MPC · JPL
148408	2000 WQ_{13}	—	November 19, 2000	Socorro	LINEAR	·	4.6 km	MPC · JPL
148409	2000 WF_{20}	—	November 25, 2000	Kitt Peak	Spacewatch	THM	3.7 km	MPC · JPL
148410	2000 WN_{24}	—	November 20, 2000	Socorro	LINEAR	·	7.5 km	MPC · JPL
148411	2000 WR_{25}	—	November 21, 2000	Socorro	LINEAR	EOS	3.4 km	MPC · JPL
148412	2000 WD_{47}	—	November 21, 2000	Socorro	LINEAR	·	3.5 km	MPC · JPL
148413	2000 WY_{62}	—	November 26, 2000	Desert Beaver	W. K. Y. Yeung	·	5.1 km	MPC · JPL
148414	2000 WU_{70}	—	November 19, 2000	Socorro	LINEAR	·	4.3 km	MPC · JPL
148415	2000 WK_{73}	—	November 20, 2000	Socorro	LINEAR	·	5.5 km	MPC · JPL
148416	2000 WQ_{73}	—	November 20, 2000	Socorro	LINEAR	·	5.7 km	MPC · JPL
148417	2000 WU_{75}	—	November 20, 2000	Socorro	LINEAR	·	5.6 km	MPC · JPL
148418	2000 WD_{81}	—	November 20, 2000	Socorro	LINEAR	HYG	7.1 km	MPC · JPL
148419	2000 WF_{83}	—	November 20, 2000	Socorro	LINEAR	·	4.8 km	MPC · JPL
148420	2000 WZ_{90}	—	November 21, 2000	Socorro	LINEAR	·	6.1 km	MPC · JPL
148421	2000 WT_{106}	—	November 20, 2000	Socorro	LINEAR	·	1.4 km	MPC · JPL
148422	2000 WE_{108}	—	November 20, 2000	Socorro	LINEAR	EOS	3.9 km	MPC · JPL
148423	2000 WN_{109}	—	November 20, 2000	Socorro	LINEAR	·	6.2 km	MPC · JPL
148424	2000 WK_{114}	—	November 20, 2000	Socorro	LINEAR	·	6.5 km	MPC · JPL
148425	2000 WZ_{114}	—	November 20, 2000	Socorro	LINEAR	·	5.6 km	MPC · JPL
148426	2000 WB_{126}	—	November 30, 2000	Socorro	LINEAR	·	3.0 km	MPC · JPL
148427	2000 WX_{132}	—	November 19, 2000	Socorro	LINEAR	·	6.5 km	MPC · JPL
148428	2000 WV_{160}	—	November 20, 2000	Anderson Mesa	LONEOS	·	7.5 km	MPC · JPL
148429	2000 WM_{165}	—	November 23, 2000	Haleakala	NEAT	fast	3.6 km	MPC · JPL
148430	2000 WZ_{167}	—	November 25, 2000	Socorro	LINEAR	·	7.2 km	MPC · JPL
148431	2000 WU_{169}	—	November 24, 2000	Anderson Mesa	LONEOS	·	3.8 km	MPC · JPL
148432	2000 WS_{176}	—	November 27, 2000	Socorro	LINEAR	KOR	2.3 km	MPC · JPL
148433	2000 XW	—	December 1, 2000	Haleakala	NEAT	·	2.6 km	MPC · JPL
148434	2000 XN_{3}	—	December 1, 2000	Socorro	LINEAR	·	4.6 km	MPC · JPL
148435	2000 XJ_{4}	—	December 1, 2000	Socorro	LINEAR	·	5.8 km	MPC · JPL
148436	2000 XP_{4}	—	December 1, 2000	Socorro	LINEAR	·	3.9 km	MPC · JPL
148437	2000 XP_{14}	—	December 4, 2000	Kitt Peak	Spacewatch	T_{j} (2.96)	7.5 km	MPC · JPL
148438	2000 XU_{24}	—	December 4, 2000	Socorro	LINEAR	·	5.9 km	MPC · JPL
148439	2000 XN_{25}	—	December 4, 2000	Socorro	LINEAR	·	3.5 km	MPC · JPL
148440	2000 XY_{26}	—	December 4, 2000	Socorro	LINEAR	·	7.7 km	MPC · JPL
148441	2000 XG_{31}	—	December 4, 2000	Socorro	LINEAR	·	7.1 km	MPC · JPL
148442	2000 XN_{33}	—	December 4, 2000	Socorro	LINEAR	·	5.0 km	MPC · JPL
148443	2000 XF_{36}	—	December 5, 2000	Socorro	LINEAR	·	5.0 km	MPC · JPL
148444	2000 XL_{42}	—	December 5, 2000	Socorro	LINEAR	·	6.9 km	MPC · JPL
148445	2000 XV_{51}	—	December 6, 2000	Socorro	LINEAR	·	1.0 km	MPC · JPL
148446	2000 XG_{54}	—	December 3, 2000	Kitt Peak	Spacewatch	HYG	4.7 km	MPC · JPL
148447	2000 YH	—	December 16, 2000	Socorro	LINEAR	·	7.6 km	MPC · JPL
148448	2000 YB_{1}	—	December 17, 2000	Gnosca	S. Sposetti	·	6.9 km	MPC · JPL
148449	2000 YQ_{5}	—	December 19, 2000	Socorro	LINEAR	·	4.6 km	MPC · JPL
148450	2000 YN_{35}	—	December 30, 2000	Socorro	LINEAR	TIR	4.0 km	MPC · JPL
148451	2000 YN_{42}	—	December 30, 2000	Socorro	LINEAR	·	5.7 km	MPC · JPL
148452	2000 YR_{59}	—	December 30, 2000	Socorro	LINEAR	·	4.1 km	MPC · JPL
148453	2000 YO_{66}	—	December 22, 2000	Socorro	LINEAR	·	8.2 km	MPC · JPL
148454	2000 YS_{70}	—	December 30, 2000	Socorro	LINEAR	·	4.1 km	MPC · JPL
148455	2000 YM_{82}	—	December 30, 2000	Socorro	LINEAR	·	7.2 km	MPC · JPL
148456	2000 YQ_{87}	—	December 30, 2000	Socorro	LINEAR	LIX	6.3 km	MPC · JPL
148457	2000 YB_{88}	—	December 30, 2000	Socorro	LINEAR	·	5.2 km	MPC · JPL
148458	2000 YG_{88}	—	December 30, 2000	Socorro	LINEAR	THM	3.9 km	MPC · JPL
148459	2000 YV_{97}	—	December 30, 2000	Socorro	LINEAR	URS	7.6 km	MPC · JPL
148460	2000 YA_{112}	—	December 30, 2000	Socorro	LINEAR	·	6.4 km	MPC · JPL
148461	2000 YW_{131}	—	December 30, 2000	Socorro	LINEAR	·	6.1 km	MPC · JPL
148462	2000 YN_{136}	—	December 23, 2000	Socorro	LINEAR	TIR	4.9 km	MPC · JPL
148463	2001 AB_{7}	—	January 2, 2001	Socorro	LINEAR	·	5.6 km	MPC · JPL
148464	2001 AT_{12}	—	January 2, 2001	Socorro	LINEAR	·	7.0 km	MPC · JPL
148465	2001 AG_{52}	—	January 2, 2001	Anderson Mesa	LONEOS	EUP	9.9 km	MPC · JPL
148466	2001 BA_{19}	—	January 19, 2001	Socorro	LINEAR	·	5.2 km	MPC · JPL
148467	2001 BF_{68}	—	January 31, 2001	Socorro	LINEAR	·	1.2 km	MPC · JPL
148468	2001 CJ_{10}	—	February 1, 2001	Socorro	LINEAR	TIR	8.6 km	MPC · JPL
148469	2001 DL_{28}	—	February 17, 2001	Socorro	LINEAR	·	1.3 km	MPC · JPL
148470	2001 DR_{42}	—	February 19, 2001	Socorro	LINEAR	·	1.2 km	MPC · JPL
148471	2001 DY_{55}	—	February 16, 2001	Kitt Peak	Spacewatch	MAS	840 m	MPC · JPL
148472	2001 DQ_{88}	—	February 27, 2001	Kitt Peak	Spacewatch	·	1.1 km	MPC · JPL
148473	2001 EC_{4}	—	March 2, 2001	Anderson Mesa	LONEOS	·	1.4 km	MPC · JPL
148474	2001 ED_{9}	—	March 2, 2001	Anderson Mesa	LONEOS	·	1.7 km	MPC · JPL
148475	2001 EX_{17}	—	March 15, 2001	Needville	Casady, L., Cruz, A.	NYS	1.3 km	MPC · JPL
148476	2001 FU_{70}	—	March 19, 2001	Socorro	LINEAR	NYS	2.0 km	MPC · JPL
148477	2001 FS_{99}	—	March 16, 2001	Kitt Peak	Spacewatch	NYS	1.4 km	MPC · JPL
148478	2001 FJ_{112}	—	March 18, 2001	Socorro	LINEAR	·	1.3 km	MPC · JPL
148479	2001 FK_{124}	—	March 27, 2001	Anderson Mesa	LONEOS	·	1.5 km	MPC · JPL
148480	2001 FE_{155}	—	March 26, 2001	Socorro	LINEAR	·	1.0 km	MPC · JPL
148481	2001 FL_{161}	—	March 29, 2001	Haleakala	NEAT	·	1.1 km	MPC · JPL
148482	2001 HC_{21}	—	April 23, 2001	Socorro	LINEAR	·	2.3 km	MPC · JPL
148483	2001 HU_{54}	—	April 24, 2001	Socorro	LINEAR	·	1.5 km	MPC · JPL
148484	2001 HK_{60}	—	April 24, 2001	Anderson Mesa	LONEOS	PHO	5.0 km	MPC · JPL
148485	2001 JW	—	May 12, 2001	Eskridge	G. Hug	·	2.3 km	MPC · JPL
148486	2001 JF_{9}	—	May 15, 2001	Haleakala	NEAT	(2076)	1.4 km	MPC · JPL
148487	2001 KB_{12}	—	May 18, 2001	Socorro	LINEAR	·	1.6 km	MPC · JPL
148488	2001 KU_{22}	—	May 17, 2001	Socorro	LINEAR	·	1.2 km	MPC · JPL
148489	2001 KD_{27}	—	May 17, 2001	Socorro	LINEAR	·	1.8 km	MPC · JPL
148490	2001 KR_{29}	—	May 21, 2001	Socorro	LINEAR	NYS	1.6 km	MPC · JPL
148491	2001 KP_{48}	—	May 24, 2001	Socorro	LINEAR	·	1.3 km	MPC · JPL
148492	2001 KB_{51}	—	May 21, 2001	Socorro	LINEAR	·	1.2 km	MPC · JPL
148493	2001 KV_{61}	—	May 18, 2001	Socorro	LINEAR	·	1.8 km	MPC · JPL
148494	2001 KX_{70}	—	May 24, 2001	Anderson Mesa	LONEOS	·	1.3 km	MPC · JPL
148495	2001 LO_{1}	—	June 14, 2001	Palomar	NEAT	PHO	4.5 km	MPC · JPL
148496	2001 LZ_{7}	—	June 15, 2001	Palomar	NEAT	V	1.2 km	MPC · JPL
148497	2001 MM_{10}	—	June 20, 2001	Palomar	NEAT	V	940 m	MPC · JPL
148498	2001 MU_{10}	—	June 21, 2001	Palomar	NEAT	·	2.2 km	MPC · JPL
148499	2001 MD_{15}	—	June 28, 2001	Anderson Mesa	LONEOS	·	2.4 km	MPC · JPL
148500	2001 MP_{15}	—	June 25, 2001	Palomar	NEAT	(5)	2.6 km	MPC · JPL

== 148501–148600 ==
back to top

Designation			Discovery			Properties		Ref
Permanent	Provisional	Named after	Date	Site	Discoverer(s)	Category	Diam.	Ref
148501	2001 MF_{18}	—	June 22, 2001	Palomar	NEAT	·	2.4 km	MPC · JPL
148502	2001 MM_{18}	—	June 26, 2001	Palomar	NEAT	·	2.1 km	MPC · JPL
148503	2001 NQ	—	July 10, 2001	Palomar	NEAT	·	2.8 km	MPC · JPL
148504	2001 NG_{18}	—	July 10, 2001	Socorro	LINEAR	·	2.5 km	MPC · JPL
148505	2001 NQ_{22}	—	July 14, 2001	Palomar	NEAT	·	2.1 km	MPC · JPL
148506	2001 OG_{7}	—	July 17, 2001	Anderson Mesa	LONEOS	·	2.6 km	MPC · JPL
148507	2001 OA_{44}	—	July 23, 2001	Palomar	NEAT	·	2.2 km	MPC · JPL
148508	2001 OX_{46}	—	July 16, 2001	Anderson Mesa	LONEOS	(2076)	1.5 km	MPC · JPL
148509	2001 ON_{58}	—	July 20, 2001	Socorro	LINEAR	·	2.2 km	MPC · JPL
148510	2001 OW_{61}	—	July 21, 2001	Haleakala	NEAT	·	2.4 km	MPC · JPL
148511	2001 OK_{67}	—	July 27, 2001	Palomar	NEAT	ADE	4.4 km	MPC · JPL
148512	2001 OL_{70}	—	July 19, 2001	Anderson Mesa	LONEOS	·	3.7 km	MPC · JPL
148513	2001 OE_{113}	—	July 22, 2001	Siding Spring	R. H. McNaught	·	3.0 km	MPC · JPL
148514	2001 PS_{5}	—	August 10, 2001	Haleakala	NEAT	·	2.4 km	MPC · JPL
148515	2001 PW_{8}	—	August 11, 2001	Haleakala	NEAT	·	2.1 km	MPC · JPL
148516	2001 PX_{9}	—	August 8, 2001	Haleakala	NEAT	·	2.0 km	MPC · JPL
148517	2001 PA_{27}	—	August 11, 2001	Haleakala	NEAT	·	2.4 km	MPC · JPL
148518	2001 PW_{28}	—	August 13, 2001	Kvistaberg	Uppsala-DLR Asteroid Survey	·	2.1 km	MPC · JPL
148519	2001 PO_{40}	—	August 11, 2001	Palomar	NEAT	EUN	2.4 km	MPC · JPL
148520	2001 PT_{41}	—	August 11, 2001	Palomar	NEAT	EUN	1.8 km	MPC · JPL
148521	2001 PL_{46}	—	August 12, 2001	Palomar	NEAT	·	1.9 km	MPC · JPL
148522	2001 PT_{49}	—	August 14, 2001	Palomar	NEAT	HNS	2.7 km	MPC · JPL
148523	2001 PH_{53}	—	August 14, 2001	Haleakala	NEAT	·	2.1 km	MPC · JPL
148524	2001 PP_{59}	—	August 14, 2001	Haleakala	NEAT	EUN	1.9 km	MPC · JPL
148525 Gipieroconsigli	2001 QG	Gipieroconsigli	August 16, 2001	San Marcello	A. Boattini, M. Tombelli	MAS	1.3 km	MPC · JPL
148526	2001 QV	—	August 16, 2001	Socorro	LINEAR	CLA	2.8 km	MPC · JPL
148527	2001 QC_{2}	—	August 16, 2001	Socorro	LINEAR	·	2.6 km	MPC · JPL
148528	2001 QC_{5}	—	August 16, 2001	Socorro	LINEAR	EUN	1.6 km	MPC · JPL
148529	2001 QQ_{5}	—	August 16, 2001	Socorro	LINEAR	MAS	1.3 km	MPC · JPL
148530	2001 QP_{19}	—	August 16, 2001	Socorro	LINEAR	(194)	3.0 km	MPC · JPL
148531	2001 QZ_{27}	—	August 16, 2001	Socorro	LINEAR	·	3.2 km	MPC · JPL
148532	2001 QL_{32}	—	August 17, 2001	Socorro	LINEAR	·	3.0 km	MPC · JPL
148533	2001 QZ_{32}	—	August 17, 2001	Palomar	NEAT	·	1.5 km	MPC · JPL
148534	2001 QQ_{39}	—	August 16, 2001	Socorro	LINEAR	·	2.2 km	MPC · JPL
148535	2001 QB_{58}	—	August 16, 2001	Socorro	LINEAR	NYS	3.8 km	MPC · JPL
148536	2001 QG_{83}	—	August 17, 2001	Socorro	LINEAR	·	3.1 km	MPC · JPL
148537	2001 QJ_{91}	—	August 16, 2001	Socorro	LINEAR	V	1.0 km	MPC · JPL
148538	2001 QM_{97}	—	August 17, 2001	Socorro	LINEAR	·	2.9 km	MPC · JPL
148539	2001 QH_{102}	—	August 19, 2001	Socorro	LINEAR	·	1.8 km	MPC · JPL
148540	2001 QN_{102}	—	August 19, 2001	Socorro	LINEAR	V	1.3 km	MPC · JPL
148541	2001 QC_{119}	—	August 17, 2001	Socorro	LINEAR	·	2.2 km	MPC · JPL
148542	2001 QH_{123}	—	August 19, 2001	Socorro	LINEAR	·	2.4 km	MPC · JPL
148543	2001 QG_{125}	—	August 19, 2001	Socorro	LINEAR	·	1.6 km	MPC · JPL
148544	2001 QM_{130}	—	August 20, 2001	Socorro	LINEAR	·	4.2 km	MPC · JPL
148545	2001 QP_{134}	—	August 22, 2001	Socorro	LINEAR	·	2.4 km	MPC · JPL
148546	2001 QW_{141}	—	August 24, 2001	Socorro	LINEAR	NYS	1.8 km	MPC · JPL
148547	2001 QK_{144}	—	August 21, 2001	Kitt Peak	Spacewatch	·	2.1 km	MPC · JPL
148548	2001 QU_{144}	—	August 23, 2001	Kitt Peak	Spacewatch	·	2.3 km	MPC · JPL
148549	2001 QL_{147}	—	August 20, 2001	Palomar	NEAT	EUN	2.6 km	MPC · JPL
148550	2001 QA_{152}	—	August 26, 2001	Socorro	LINEAR	·	4.3 km	MPC · JPL
148551	2001 QU_{155}	—	August 23, 2001	Anderson Mesa	LONEOS	HNS	1.9 km	MPC · JPL
148552	2001 QR_{159}	—	August 23, 2001	Anderson Mesa	LONEOS	·	2.6 km	MPC · JPL
148553	2001 QB_{161}	—	August 23, 2001	Anderson Mesa	LONEOS	·	1.8 km	MPC · JPL
148554	2001 QR_{163}	—	August 31, 2001	Desert Eagle	W. K. Y. Yeung	·	1.7 km	MPC · JPL
148555	2001 QM_{164}	—	August 21, 2001	Haleakala	NEAT	PHO	1.5 km	MPC · JPL
148556	2001 QZ_{176}	—	August 26, 2001	Kitt Peak	Spacewatch	NYS	2.5 km	MPC · JPL
148557	2001 QH_{194}	—	August 22, 2001	Socorro	LINEAR	·	5.3 km	MPC · JPL
148558	2001 QQ_{194}	—	August 22, 2001	Socorro	LINEAR	EUN	3.3 km	MPC · JPL
148559	2001 QW_{203}	—	August 23, 2001	Anderson Mesa	LONEOS	·	2.2 km	MPC · JPL
148560	2001 QP_{204}	—	August 23, 2001	Anderson Mesa	LONEOS	slow	2.3 km	MPC · JPL
148561	2001 QO_{215}	—	August 23, 2001	Anderson Mesa	LONEOS	KOR	2.1 km	MPC · JPL
148562	2001 QJ_{216}	—	August 23, 2001	Anderson Mesa	LONEOS	·	1.7 km	MPC · JPL
148563	2001 QW_{219}	—	August 23, 2001	Socorro	LINEAR	·	4.6 km	MPC · JPL
148564	2001 QA_{223}	—	August 24, 2001	Anderson Mesa	LONEOS	(194)	2.0 km	MPC · JPL
148565	2001 QP_{228}	—	August 24, 2001	Anderson Mesa	LONEOS	MAR	1.8 km	MPC · JPL
148566	2001 QJ_{233}	—	August 24, 2001	Socorro	LINEAR	·	2.1 km	MPC · JPL
148567	2001 QK_{236}	—	August 24, 2001	Socorro	LINEAR	·	1.7 km	MPC · JPL
148568	2001 QS_{244}	—	August 24, 2001	Socorro	LINEAR	·	4.8 km	MPC · JPL
148569	2001 QR_{254}	—	August 25, 2001	Anderson Mesa	LONEOS	·	2.3 km	MPC · JPL
148570	2001 QK_{255}	—	August 25, 2001	Socorro	LINEAR	EUN	1.8 km	MPC · JPL
148571	2001 QB_{260}	—	August 25, 2001	Socorro	LINEAR	RAF	1.4 km	MPC · JPL
148572	2001 QS_{265}	—	August 26, 2001	Haleakala	NEAT	·	3.3 km	MPC · JPL
148573	2001 QN_{268}	—	August 20, 2001	Palomar	NEAT	·	2.2 km	MPC · JPL
148574	2001 QK_{269}	—	August 20, 2001	Haleakala	NEAT	·	3.3 km	MPC · JPL
148575	2001 QA_{272}	—	August 19, 2001	Eskridge	Farpoint	·	2.4 km	MPC · JPL
148576	2001 QU_{274}	—	August 19, 2001	Socorro	LINEAR	·	2.7 km	MPC · JPL
148577	2001 QV_{284}	—	August 18, 2001	Palomar	NEAT	·	3.0 km	MPC · JPL
148578	2001 QG_{286}	—	August 17, 2001	Palomar	NEAT	·	1.6 km	MPC · JPL
148579	2001 QD_{287}	—	August 17, 2001	Socorro	LINEAR	·	2.6 km	MPC · JPL
148580	2001 QG_{291}	—	August 16, 2001	Socorro	LINEAR	(5)	2.3 km	MPC · JPL
148581	2001 QS_{292}	—	August 16, 2001	Socorro	LINEAR	(5)	3.0 km	MPC · JPL
148582	2001 QM_{333}	—	August 20, 2001	Haleakala	NEAT	EUN	2.2 km	MPC · JPL
148583	2001 QN_{333}	—	August 20, 2001	Haleakala	NEAT	·	2.9 km	MPC · JPL
148584	2001 QU_{333}	—	August 27, 2001	Palomar	NEAT	EOS	3.3 km	MPC · JPL
148585	2001 RO_{4}	—	September 8, 2001	Socorro	LINEAR	·	1.7 km	MPC · JPL
148586	2001 RP_{5}	—	September 9, 2001	Desert Eagle	W. K. Y. Yeung	(5)	1.5 km	MPC · JPL
148587	2001 RM_{6}	—	September 10, 2001	Desert Eagle	W. K. Y. Yeung	·	2.8 km	MPC · JPL
148588	2001 RW_{7}	—	September 8, 2001	Socorro	LINEAR	(5)	1.6 km	MPC · JPL
148589	2001 RQ_{11}	—	September 10, 2001	Desert Eagle	W. K. Y. Yeung	·	3.4 km	MPC · JPL
148590	2001 RQ_{15}	—	September 7, 2001	Socorro	LINEAR	·	1.9 km	MPC · JPL
148591	2001 RR_{16}	—	September 10, 2001	Kanab	Sheridan, E. E.	·	1.9 km	MPC · JPL
148592	2001 RM_{17}	—	September 11, 2001	Desert Eagle	W. K. Y. Yeung	KOR	2.6 km	MPC · JPL
148593	2001 RO_{21}	—	September 7, 2001	Socorro	LINEAR	·	2.4 km	MPC · JPL
148594	2001 RX_{29}	—	September 7, 2001	Socorro	LINEAR	RAF	1.3 km	MPC · JPL
148595	2001 RR_{32}	—	September 8, 2001	Socorro	LINEAR	·	2.4 km	MPC · JPL
148596	2001 RD_{33}	—	September 8, 2001	Socorro	LINEAR	·	2.6 km	MPC · JPL
148597	2001 RL_{33}	—	September 8, 2001	Socorro	LINEAR	(194)	2.2 km	MPC · JPL
148598	2001 RT_{40}	—	September 11, 2001	Socorro	LINEAR	(5)	2.7 km	MPC · JPL
148599	2001 RN_{48}	—	September 10, 2001	Socorro	LINEAR	·	3.1 km	MPC · JPL
148600	2001 RE_{52}	—	September 12, 2001	Socorro	LINEAR	NYS	1.6 km	MPC · JPL

== 148601–148700 ==
back to top

Designation			Discovery			Properties		Ref
Permanent	Provisional	Named after	Date	Site	Discoverer(s)	Category	Diam.	Ref
148601	2001 RE_{55}	—	September 12, 2001	Socorro	LINEAR	·	1.4 km	MPC · JPL
148602	2001 RK_{56}	—	September 12, 2001	Socorro	LINEAR	·	4.6 km	MPC · JPL
148603	2001 RF_{59}	—	September 12, 2001	Socorro	LINEAR	·	1.0 km	MPC · JPL
148604 Shobbrook	2001 RO_{63}	Shobbrook	September 11, 2001	Oakley	Wolfe, C.	·	2.7 km	MPC · JPL
148605	2001 RT_{63}	—	September 11, 2001	Anderson Mesa	LONEOS	·	1.9 km	MPC · JPL
148606	2001 RK_{71}	—	September 10, 2001	Socorro	LINEAR	V	1.7 km	MPC · JPL
148607	2001 RN_{80}	—	September 13, 2001	Palomar	NEAT	MAR	2.3 km	MPC · JPL
148608	2001 RS_{80}	—	September 14, 2001	Palomar	NEAT	ADE	5.2 km	MPC · JPL
148609	2001 RB_{83}	—	September 11, 2001	Anderson Mesa	LONEOS	·	3.7 km	MPC · JPL
148610	2001 RF_{98}	—	September 12, 2001	Kitt Peak	Spacewatch	·	1.8 km	MPC · JPL
148611	2001 RQ_{104}	—	September 12, 2001	Socorro	LINEAR	NYS	1.9 km	MPC · JPL
148612	2001 RY_{108}	—	September 12, 2001	Socorro	LINEAR	NYS	1.3 km	MPC · JPL
148613	2001 RV_{109}	—	September 12, 2001	Socorro	LINEAR	·	2.0 km	MPC · JPL
148614	2001 RR_{113}	—	September 12, 2001	Socorro	LINEAR	·	1.6 km	MPC · JPL
148615	2001 RS_{114}	—	September 12, 2001	Socorro	LINEAR	·	1.8 km	MPC · JPL
148616	2001 RC_{117}	—	September 12, 2001	Socorro	LINEAR	·	2.7 km	MPC · JPL
148617	2001 RA_{118}	—	September 12, 2001	Socorro	LINEAR	(5)	2.2 km	MPC · JPL
148618	2001 RV_{119}	—	September 12, 2001	Socorro	LINEAR	·	1.8 km	MPC · JPL
148619	2001 RM_{120}	—	September 12, 2001	Socorro	LINEAR	·	3.3 km	MPC · JPL
148620	2001 RE_{122}	—	September 12, 2001	Socorro	LINEAR	(5)	1.9 km	MPC · JPL
148621	2001 RC_{126}	—	September 12, 2001	Socorro	LINEAR	(5)	1.6 km	MPC · JPL
148622	2001 RY_{126}	—	September 12, 2001	Socorro	LINEAR	(5)	1.6 km	MPC · JPL
148623	2001 RG_{127}	—	September 12, 2001	Socorro	LINEAR	·	1.7 km	MPC · JPL
148624	2001 RE_{131}	—	September 12, 2001	Socorro	LINEAR	·	2.8 km	MPC · JPL
148625	2001 RD_{133}	—	September 12, 2001	Socorro	LINEAR	·	1.6 km	MPC · JPL
148626	2001 RV_{134}	—	September 12, 2001	Socorro	LINEAR	EUN	1.9 km	MPC · JPL
148627	2001 RE_{136}	—	September 12, 2001	Socorro	LINEAR	·	2.3 km	MPC · JPL
148628	2001 RP_{151}	—	September 11, 2001	Anderson Mesa	LONEOS	·	2.7 km	MPC · JPL
148629	2001 RT_{151}	—	September 11, 2001	Anderson Mesa	LONEOS	·	2.7 km	MPC · JPL
148630	2001 RU_{155}	—	September 12, 2001	Socorro	LINEAR	·	2.2 km	MPC · JPL
148631	2001 SP_{3}	—	September 17, 2001	Desert Eagle	W. K. Y. Yeung	·	2.8 km	MPC · JPL
148632	2001 SO_{10}	—	September 16, 2001	Socorro	LINEAR	MAR	1.6 km	MPC · JPL
148633	2001 SU_{13}	—	September 16, 2001	Socorro	LINEAR	ADE ·	3.2 km	MPC · JPL
148634	2001 SL_{19}	—	September 16, 2001	Socorro	LINEAR	·	1.5 km	MPC · JPL
148635	2001 ST_{19}	—	September 16, 2001	Socorro	LINEAR	·	3.0 km	MPC · JPL
148636	2001 SJ_{22}	—	September 16, 2001	Socorro	LINEAR	·	1.2 km	MPC · JPL
148637	2001 SY_{23}	—	September 16, 2001	Socorro	LINEAR	·	1.9 km	MPC · JPL
148638	2001 SH_{31}	—	September 16, 2001	Socorro	LINEAR	·	1.9 km	MPC · JPL
148639	2001 SQ_{31}	—	September 16, 2001	Socorro	LINEAR	KOR	2.6 km	MPC · JPL
148640	2001 SB_{42}	—	September 16, 2001	Socorro	LINEAR	·	3.2 km	MPC · JPL
148641	2001 SB_{45}	—	September 16, 2001	Socorro	LINEAR	(5)	2.4 km	MPC · JPL
148642	2001 SO_{45}	—	September 16, 2001	Socorro	LINEAR	EUN	1.8 km	MPC · JPL
148643	2001 ST_{45}	—	September 16, 2001	Socorro	LINEAR	·	2.0 km	MPC · JPL
148644	2001 SU_{56}	—	September 16, 2001	Socorro	LINEAR	·	3.3 km	MPC · JPL
148645	2001 SD_{61}	—	September 17, 2001	Socorro	LINEAR	·	3.6 km	MPC · JPL
148646	2001 SY_{66}	—	September 17, 2001	Socorro	LINEAR	·	2.4 km	MPC · JPL
148647	2001 SL_{75}	—	September 19, 2001	Anderson Mesa	LONEOS	·	2.8 km	MPC · JPL
148648	2001 SD_{86}	—	September 20, 2001	Socorro	LINEAR	NYS	1.5 km	MPC · JPL
148649	2001 SY_{86}	—	September 20, 2001	Socorro	LINEAR	·	1.8 km	MPC · JPL
148650	2001 ST_{93}	—	September 20, 2001	Socorro	LINEAR	NYS	2.4 km	MPC · JPL
148651	2001 SQ_{110}	—	September 20, 2001	Socorro	LINEAR	ADE	4.3 km	MPC · JPL
148652	2001 SB_{111}	—	September 20, 2001	Socorro	LINEAR	·	3.9 km	MPC · JPL
148653	2001 SK_{118}	—	September 16, 2001	Socorro	LINEAR	·	1.8 km	MPC · JPL
148654	2001 SK_{119}	—	September 16, 2001	Socorro	LINEAR	·	3.1 km	MPC · JPL
148655	2001 SG_{121}	—	September 16, 2001	Socorro	LINEAR	·	4.2 km	MPC · JPL
148656	2001 SW_{123}	—	September 16, 2001	Socorro	LINEAR	·	2.1 km	MPC · JPL
148657	2001 SX_{124}	—	September 16, 2001	Socorro	LINEAR	·	2.1 km	MPC · JPL
148658	2001 SG_{128}	—	September 16, 2001	Socorro	LINEAR	SUL	3.0 km	MPC · JPL
148659	2001 ST_{128}	—	September 16, 2001	Socorro	LINEAR	·	2.0 km	MPC · JPL
148660	2001 SW_{131}	—	September 16, 2001	Socorro	LINEAR	·	3.6 km	MPC · JPL
148661	2001 SE_{137}	—	September 16, 2001	Socorro	LINEAR	NYS	2.2 km	MPC · JPL
148662	2001 SA_{138}	—	September 16, 2001	Socorro	LINEAR	·	1.4 km	MPC · JPL
148663	2001 SM_{145}	—	September 16, 2001	Socorro	LINEAR	·	2.2 km	MPC · JPL
148664	2001 SH_{150}	—	September 17, 2001	Socorro	LINEAR	·	2.9 km	MPC · JPL
148665	2001 SQ_{156}	—	September 17, 2001	Socorro	LINEAR	RAF	1.4 km	MPC · JPL
148666	2001 SP_{158}	—	September 17, 2001	Socorro	LINEAR	·	3.6 km	MPC · JPL
148667	2001 SW_{158}	—	September 17, 2001	Socorro	LINEAR	(5)	2.2 km	MPC · JPL
148668	2001 SH_{161}	—	September 17, 2001	Socorro	LINEAR	·	2.1 km	MPC · JPL
148669	2001 SL_{162}	—	September 17, 2001	Socorro	LINEAR	·	2.6 km	MPC · JPL
148670	2001 SU_{165}	—	September 19, 2001	Socorro	LINEAR	NYS	1.6 km	MPC · JPL
148671	2001 SQ_{166}	—	September 19, 2001	Socorro	LINEAR	·	2.0 km	MPC · JPL
148672	2001 SQ_{172}	—	September 16, 2001	Socorro	LINEAR	·	2.3 km	MPC · JPL
148673	2001 SB_{176}	—	September 16, 2001	Socorro	LINEAR	MIS	4.1 km	MPC · JPL
148674	2001 SZ_{186}	—	September 19, 2001	Socorro	LINEAR	·	1.8 km	MPC · JPL
148675	2001 SF_{200}	—	September 19, 2001	Socorro	LINEAR	·	1.7 km	MPC · JPL
148676	2001 SR_{202}	—	September 19, 2001	Socorro	LINEAR	·	2.0 km	MPC · JPL
148677	2001 ST_{210}	—	September 19, 2001	Socorro	LINEAR	·	1.8 km	MPC · JPL
148678	2001 SM_{213}	—	September 19, 2001	Socorro	LINEAR	(5)	1.6 km	MPC · JPL
148679	2001 SB_{215}	—	September 19, 2001	Socorro	LINEAR	JUN	2.5 km	MPC · JPL
148680	2001 SX_{215}	—	September 19, 2001	Socorro	LINEAR	·	1.6 km	MPC · JPL
148681	2001 SA_{224}	—	September 19, 2001	Socorro	LINEAR	·	3.1 km	MPC · JPL
148682	2001 SB_{224}	—	September 19, 2001	Socorro	LINEAR	·	1.4 km	MPC · JPL
148683	2001 SG_{227}	—	September 19, 2001	Socorro	LINEAR	KOR	3.0 km	MPC · JPL
148684	2001 SZ_{229}	—	September 19, 2001	Socorro	LINEAR	·	1.9 km	MPC · JPL
148685	2001 SF_{230}	—	September 19, 2001	Socorro	LINEAR	·	1.8 km	MPC · JPL
148686	2001 SS_{235}	—	September 19, 2001	Socorro	LINEAR	·	2.0 km	MPC · JPL
148687	2001 SO_{244}	—	September 19, 2001	Socorro	LINEAR	·	1.7 km	MPC · JPL
148688	2001 SU_{246}	—	September 19, 2001	Socorro	LINEAR	·	2.0 km	MPC · JPL
148689	2001 SM_{247}	—	September 19, 2001	Socorro	LINEAR	·	2.6 km	MPC · JPL
148690	2001 SV_{247}	—	September 19, 2001	Socorro	LINEAR	·	1.9 km	MPC · JPL
148691	2001 SQ_{250}	—	September 19, 2001	Socorro	LINEAR	·	2.0 km	MPC · JPL
148692	2001 SC_{252}	—	September 19, 2001	Socorro	LINEAR	·	1.9 km	MPC · JPL
148693	2001 SJ_{253}	—	September 19, 2001	Socorro	LINEAR	·	2.2 km	MPC · JPL
148694	2001 SP_{253}	—	September 19, 2001	Socorro	LINEAR	·	2.2 km	MPC · JPL
148695	2001 SR_{253}	—	September 19, 2001	Socorro	LINEAR	·	1.5 km	MPC · JPL
148696	2001 SS_{260}	—	September 20, 2001	Socorro	LINEAR	(5)	1.7 km	MPC · JPL
148697	2001 SH_{261}	—	September 20, 2001	Socorro	LINEAR	·	2.2 km	MPC · JPL
148698	2001 SA_{264}	—	September 24, 2001	Socorro	LINEAR	·	3.3 km	MPC · JPL
148699	2001 SA_{272}	—	September 20, 2001	Socorro	LINEAR	·	2.6 km	MPC · JPL
148700	2001 SU_{277}	—	September 21, 2001	Anderson Mesa	LONEOS	·	1.8 km	MPC · JPL

== 148701–148800 ==
back to top

Designation			Discovery			Properties		Ref
Permanent	Provisional	Named after	Date	Site	Discoverer(s)	Category	Diam.	Ref
148701	2001 SV_{289}	—	September 29, 2001	Palomar	NEAT	·	2.6 km	MPC · JPL
148702	2001 SG_{316}	—	September 25, 2001	Socorro	LINEAR	·	3.5 km	MPC · JPL
148703	2001 SX_{320}	—	September 23, 2001	Socorro	LINEAR	·	2.0 km	MPC · JPL
148704	2001 SV_{323}	—	September 25, 2001	Socorro	LINEAR	ADE	3.4 km	MPC · JPL
148705	2001 SZ_{339}	—	September 21, 2001	Anderson Mesa	LONEOS	·	2.4 km	MPC · JPL
148706	2001 SA_{349}	—	September 29, 2001	Palomar	NEAT	HNS	1.4 km	MPC · JPL
148707 Dodelson	2001 SC_{353}	Dodelson	September 19, 2001	Apache Point	SDSS	EUN	1.9 km	MPC · JPL
148708	2001 TX_{14}	—	October 10, 2001	Palomar	NEAT	·	1.9 km	MPC · JPL
148709	2001 TW_{16}	—	October 13, 2001	Socorro	LINEAR	H	1.2 km	MPC · JPL
148710	2001 TJ_{20}	—	October 9, 2001	Socorro	LINEAR	·	2.7 km	MPC · JPL
148711	2001 TQ_{22}	—	October 13, 2001	Socorro	LINEAR	·	1.7 km	MPC · JPL
148712	2001 TX_{30}	—	October 14, 2001	Socorro	LINEAR	(5)	1.8 km	MPC · JPL
148713	2001 TA_{36}	—	October 14, 2001	Socorro	LINEAR	·	4.0 km	MPC · JPL
148714	2001 TD_{39}	—	October 14, 2001	Socorro	LINEAR	·	3.2 km	MPC · JPL
148715	2001 TK_{40}	—	October 14, 2001	Socorro	LINEAR	·	3.7 km	MPC · JPL
148716	2001 TR_{40}	—	October 14, 2001	Socorro	LINEAR	·	4.7 km	MPC · JPL
148717	2001 TB_{50}	—	October 13, 2001	Socorro	LINEAR	·	3.5 km	MPC · JPL
148718	2001 TK_{51}	—	October 13, 2001	Socorro	LINEAR	·	1.6 km	MPC · JPL
148719	2001 TO_{51}	—	October 13, 2001	Socorro	LINEAR	·	2.6 km	MPC · JPL
148720	2001 TC_{52}	—	October 13, 2001	Socorro	LINEAR	·	2.9 km	MPC · JPL
148721	2001 TD_{52}	—	October 13, 2001	Socorro	LINEAR	·	2.7 km	MPC · JPL
148722	2001 TN_{64}	—	October 13, 2001	Socorro	LINEAR	MAR	2.2 km	MPC · JPL
148723	2001 TJ_{67}	—	October 13, 2001	Socorro	LINEAR	·	2.2 km	MPC · JPL
148724	2001 TM_{69}	—	October 13, 2001	Socorro	LINEAR	·	2.3 km	MPC · JPL
148725	2001 TX_{70}	—	October 13, 2001	Socorro	LINEAR	·	2.0 km	MPC · JPL
148726	2001 TY_{73}	—	October 13, 2001	Socorro	LINEAR	MIS	5.6 km	MPC · JPL
148727	2001 TS_{75}	—	October 13, 2001	Socorro	LINEAR	EUN	2.0 km	MPC · JPL
148728	2001 TG_{85}	—	October 14, 2001	Socorro	LINEAR	MIS	3.0 km	MPC · JPL
148729	2001 TB_{87}	—	October 14, 2001	Socorro	LINEAR	·	2.0 km	MPC · JPL
148730	2001 TJ_{87}	—	October 14, 2001	Socorro	LINEAR	·	2.3 km	MPC · JPL
148731	2001 TA_{88}	—	October 14, 2001	Socorro	LINEAR	·	2.7 km	MPC · JPL
148732	2001 TA_{94}	—	October 14, 2001	Socorro	LINEAR	·	1.9 km	MPC · JPL
148733	2001 TD_{94}	—	October 14, 2001	Socorro	LINEAR	·	2.3 km	MPC · JPL
148734	2001 TL_{102}	—	October 15, 2001	Socorro	LINEAR	·	4.5 km	MPC · JPL
148735	2001 TN_{104}	—	October 15, 2001	Desert Eagle	W. K. Y. Yeung	·	5.1 km	MPC · JPL
148736	2001 TG_{105}	—	October 13, 2001	Socorro	LINEAR	·	3.8 km	MPC · JPL
148737	2001 TC_{113}	—	October 14, 2001	Socorro	LINEAR	CLO	4.7 km	MPC · JPL
148738	2001 TF_{113}	—	October 14, 2001	Socorro	LINEAR	HNS	1.9 km	MPC · JPL
148739	2001 TX_{114}	—	October 14, 2001	Socorro	LINEAR	·	3.5 km	MPC · JPL
148740	2001 TS_{115}	—	October 14, 2001	Socorro	LINEAR	·	4.1 km	MPC · JPL
148741	2001 TT_{118}	—	October 15, 2001	Socorro	LINEAR	EUN	2.4 km	MPC · JPL
148742	2001 TM_{120}	—	October 15, 2001	Socorro	LINEAR	·	2.8 km	MPC · JPL
148743	2001 TS_{132}	—	October 12, 2001	Haleakala	NEAT	·	2.8 km	MPC · JPL
148744	2001 TF_{134}	—	October 12, 2001	Haleakala	NEAT	·	5.7 km	MPC · JPL
148745	2001 TA_{136}	—	October 13, 2001	Palomar	NEAT	·	2.9 km	MPC · JPL
148746	2001 TP_{139}	—	October 10, 2001	Palomar	NEAT	·	1.9 km	MPC · JPL
148747	2001 TR_{143}	—	October 10, 2001	Palomar	NEAT	·	2.0 km	MPC · JPL
148748	2001 TF_{164}	—	October 11, 2001	Palomar	NEAT	·	1.8 km	MPC · JPL
148749	2001 TM_{170}	—	October 13, 2001	Palomar	NEAT	·	3.8 km	MPC · JPL
148750	2001 TL_{171}	—	October 15, 2001	Palomar	NEAT	·	2.5 km	MPC · JPL
148751	2001 TQ_{178}	—	October 14, 2001	Socorro	LINEAR	·	1.9 km	MPC · JPL
148752	2001 TS_{180}	—	October 14, 2001	Socorro	LINEAR	·	2.2 km	MPC · JPL
148753	2001 TZ_{181}	—	October 14, 2001	Socorro	LINEAR	·	2.3 km	MPC · JPL
148754	2001 TG_{191}	—	October 14, 2001	Socorro	LINEAR	·	2.2 km	MPC · JPL
148755	2001 TH_{191}	—	October 14, 2001	Socorro	LINEAR	GEF	1.9 km	MPC · JPL
148756	2001 TD_{194}	—	October 15, 2001	Socorro	LINEAR	NYS	1.8 km	MPC · JPL
148757	2001 TG_{195}	—	October 15, 2001	Palomar	NEAT	·	3.1 km	MPC · JPL
148758	2001 TK_{196}	—	October 14, 2001	Palomar	NEAT	·	2.5 km	MPC · JPL
148759	2001 TF_{203}	—	October 11, 2001	Socorro	LINEAR	·	4.0 km	MPC · JPL
148760	2001 TH_{212}	—	October 13, 2001	Palomar	NEAT	·	2.2 km	MPC · JPL
148761	2001 TX_{215}	—	October 13, 2001	Palomar	NEAT	·	2.9 km	MPC · JPL
148762	2001 TL_{219}	—	October 14, 2001	Anderson Mesa	LONEOS	·	1.9 km	MPC · JPL
148763	2001 TK_{225}	—	October 14, 2001	Anderson Mesa	LONEOS	·	2.5 km	MPC · JPL
148764	2001 TA_{227}	—	October 15, 2001	Needville	Needville	·	1.6 km	MPC · JPL
148765	2001 TQ_{228}	—	October 15, 2001	Socorro	LINEAR	MAR	2.0 km	MPC · JPL
148766	2001 TY_{228}	—	October 15, 2001	Socorro	LINEAR	·	2.5 km	MPC · JPL
148767	2001 TJ_{229}	—	October 15, 2001	Palomar	NEAT	·	2.7 km	MPC · JPL
148768	2001 TB_{232}	—	October 15, 2001	Palomar	NEAT	·	2.6 km	MPC · JPL
148769	2001 TE_{239}	—	October 15, 2001	Palomar	NEAT	·	5.0 km	MPC · JPL
148770	2001 TD_{240}	—	October 10, 2001	Palomar	NEAT	·	2.5 km	MPC · JPL
148771	2001 UN	—	October 16, 2001	Elmira	Cecce, A. J.	·	2.8 km	MPC · JPL
148772	2001 UU_{2}	—	October 20, 2001	Emerald Lane	L. Ball	·	2.2 km	MPC · JPL
148773	2001 UT_{3}	—	October 16, 2001	Socorro	LINEAR	·	3.7 km	MPC · JPL
148774	2001 UK_{4}	—	October 17, 2001	Desert Eagle	W. K. Y. Yeung	·	2.6 km	MPC · JPL
148775	2001 UM_{4}	—	October 17, 2001	Desert Eagle	W. K. Y. Yeung	·	2.3 km	MPC · JPL
148776	2001 US_{8}	—	October 17, 2001	Socorro	LINEAR	·	2.2 km	MPC · JPL
148777	2001 UK_{10}	—	October 16, 2001	Desert Eagle	W. K. Y. Yeung	·	2.8 km	MPC · JPL
148778	2001 UL_{13}	—	October 24, 2001	Desert Eagle	W. K. Y. Yeung	·	1.9 km	MPC · JPL
148779	2001 UJ_{18}	—	October 16, 2001	Kitt Peak	Spacewatch	·	2.3 km	MPC · JPL
148780 Altjira	2001 UQ_{18}	Altjira	October 20, 2001	Kitt Peak	Deep Ecliptic Survey	cubewano (hot) · moon	191 km	MPC · JPL
148781	2001 UL_{19}	—	October 16, 2001	Palomar	NEAT	·	3.0 km	MPC · JPL
148782	2001 UE_{21}	—	October 17, 2001	Socorro	LINEAR	·	2.6 km	MPC · JPL
148783	2001 UL_{21}	—	October 17, 2001	Socorro	LINEAR	·	3.7 km	MPC · JPL
148784	2001 UK_{25}	—	October 18, 2001	Socorro	LINEAR	EUN	2.5 km	MPC · JPL
148785	2001 UN_{26}	—	October 18, 2001	Socorro	LINEAR	ADE	3.1 km	MPC · JPL
148786	2001 UD_{32}	—	October 16, 2001	Socorro	LINEAR	·	2.7 km	MPC · JPL
148787	2001 UV_{32}	—	October 16, 2001	Socorro	LINEAR	·	2.7 km	MPC · JPL
148788	2001 UP_{42}	—	October 17, 2001	Socorro	LINEAR	RAF	1.4 km	MPC · JPL
148789	2001 UX_{47}	—	October 17, 2001	Socorro	LINEAR	EUN	2.2 km	MPC · JPL
148790	2001 UU_{50}	—	October 17, 2001	Socorro	LINEAR	·	3.9 km	MPC · JPL
148791	2001 UW_{53}	—	October 17, 2001	Socorro	LINEAR	·	2.3 km	MPC · JPL
148792	2001 UF_{54}	—	October 18, 2001	Socorro	LINEAR	·	2.3 km	MPC · JPL
148793	2001 UZ_{60}	—	October 17, 2001	Socorro	LINEAR	·	2.3 km	MPC · JPL
148794	2001 UF_{62}	—	October 17, 2001	Socorro	LINEAR	·	2.3 km	MPC · JPL
148795	2001 UV_{65}	—	October 18, 2001	Socorro	LINEAR	·	3.3 km	MPC · JPL
148796	2001 UP_{66}	—	October 19, 2001	Socorro	LINEAR	·	2.5 km	MPC · JPL
148797	2001 UH_{67}	—	October 20, 2001	Socorro	LINEAR	·	1.9 km	MPC · JPL
148798	2001 UL_{75}	—	October 17, 2001	Socorro	LINEAR	·	3.0 km	MPC · JPL
148799	2001 UQ_{81}	—	October 20, 2001	Socorro	LINEAR	·	2.5 km	MPC · JPL
148800	2001 UM_{91}	—	October 18, 2001	Palomar	NEAT	·	1.8 km	MPC · JPL

== 148801–148900 ==
back to top

Designation			Discovery			Properties		Ref
Permanent	Provisional	Named after	Date	Site	Discoverer(s)	Category	Diam.	Ref
148801	2001 UR_{93}	—	October 19, 2001	Haleakala	NEAT	ADE	3.5 km	MPC · JPL
148802	2001 UO_{98}	—	October 17, 2001	Socorro	LINEAR	·	2.0 km	MPC · JPL
148803	2001 US_{99}	—	October 17, 2001	Socorro	LINEAR	·	2.6 km	MPC · JPL
148804	2001 UX_{101}	—	October 20, 2001	Socorro	LINEAR	·	2.2 km	MPC · JPL
148805	2001 UU_{103}	—	October 20, 2001	Socorro	LINEAR	·	2.6 km	MPC · JPL
148806	2001 UW_{106}	—	October 20, 2001	Socorro	LINEAR	·	7.0 km	MPC · JPL
148807	2001 UM_{108}	—	October 20, 2001	Socorro	LINEAR	·	2.5 km	MPC · JPL
148808	2001 US_{108}	—	October 20, 2001	Socorro	LINEAR	·	3.0 km	MPC · JPL
148809	2001 UP_{110}	—	October 21, 2001	Socorro	LINEAR	·	2.1 km	MPC · JPL
148810	2001 UX_{112}	—	October 21, 2001	Socorro	LINEAR	·	2.7 km	MPC · JPL
148811	2001 UX_{114}	—	October 22, 2001	Socorro	LINEAR	·	2.2 km	MPC · JPL
148812	2001 UN_{115}	—	October 22, 2001	Socorro	LINEAR	LEO	3.8 km	MPC · JPL
148813	2001 UY_{116}	—	October 22, 2001	Socorro	LINEAR	·	2.4 km	MPC · JPL
148814	2001 UK_{117}	—	October 22, 2001	Socorro	LINEAR	·	2.2 km	MPC · JPL
148815	2001 UD_{118}	—	October 22, 2001	Socorro	LINEAR	·	2.2 km	MPC · JPL
148816	2001 UB_{124}	—	October 22, 2001	Palomar	NEAT	·	3.0 km	MPC · JPL
148817	2001 UN_{125}	—	October 22, 2001	Palomar	NEAT	·	3.4 km	MPC · JPL
148818	2001 UT_{125}	—	October 22, 2001	Palomar	NEAT	ADE	2.4 km	MPC · JPL
148819	2001 UO_{126}	—	October 17, 2001	Socorro	LINEAR	·	2.3 km	MPC · JPL
148820	2001 UW_{127}	—	October 17, 2001	Socorro	LINEAR	·	3.5 km	MPC · JPL
148821	2001 UV_{130}	—	October 20, 2001	Socorro	LINEAR	·	2.2 km	MPC · JPL
148822	2001 UQ_{132}	—	October 21, 2001	Socorro	LINEAR	·	1.9 km	MPC · JPL
148823	2001 UR_{141}	—	October 23, 2001	Socorro	LINEAR	·	1.9 km	MPC · JPL
148824	2001 UY_{144}	—	October 23, 2001	Socorro	LINEAR	·	1.9 km	MPC · JPL
148825	2001 UA_{145}	—	October 23, 2001	Socorro	LINEAR	·	4.3 km	MPC · JPL
148826	2001 UJ_{153}	—	October 23, 2001	Socorro	LINEAR	·	2.7 km	MPC · JPL
148827	2001 UV_{154}	—	October 23, 2001	Socorro	LINEAR	·	5.3 km	MPC · JPL
148828	2001 UZ_{158}	—	October 23, 2001	Socorro	LINEAR	·	3.2 km	MPC · JPL
148829	2001 UD_{167}	—	October 19, 2001	Socorro	LINEAR	·	3.1 km	MPC · JPL
148830	2001 UL_{169}	—	October 19, 2001	Socorro	LINEAR	·	4.0 km	MPC · JPL
148831	2001 UN_{169}	—	October 19, 2001	Socorro	LINEAR	·	3.6 km	MPC · JPL
148832	2001 UA_{176}	—	October 21, 2001	Kitt Peak	Spacewatch	(7744)	2.1 km	MPC · JPL
148833	2001 UY_{177}	—	October 23, 2001	Socorro	LINEAR	·	1.6 km	MPC · JPL
148834	2001 UF_{192}	—	October 18, 2001	Socorro	LINEAR	·	1.7 km	MPC · JPL
148835	2001 UQ_{192}	—	October 18, 2001	Socorro	LINEAR	·	2.4 km	MPC · JPL
148836	2001 UN_{196}	—	October 18, 2001	Palomar	NEAT	THM	3.7 km	MPC · JPL
148837	2001 UK_{210}	—	October 21, 2001	Anderson Mesa	LONEOS	HNS	1.8 km	MPC · JPL
148838	2001 UP_{214}	—	October 23, 2001	Socorro	LINEAR	AGN	1.7 km	MPC · JPL
148839	2001 UK_{218}	—	October 26, 2001	Kitt Peak	Spacewatch	EUN	2.1 km	MPC · JPL
148840	2001 VD_{7}	—	November 9, 2001	Socorro	LINEAR	·	2.1 km	MPC · JPL
148841	2001 VL_{11}	—	November 10, 2001	Socorro	LINEAR	·	3.2 km	MPC · JPL
148842	2001 VG_{13}	—	November 10, 2001	Socorro	LINEAR	·	2.1 km	MPC · JPL
148843	2001 VZ_{16}	—	November 11, 2001	Socorro	LINEAR	EUN	2.1 km	MPC · JPL
148844	2001 VA_{22}	—	November 9, 2001	Socorro	LINEAR	·	4.0 km	MPC · JPL
148845	2001 VE_{22}	—	November 9, 2001	Socorro	LINEAR	·	2.8 km	MPC · JPL
148846	2001 VK_{22}	—	November 9, 2001	Socorro	LINEAR	·	3.0 km	MPC · JPL
148847	2001 VY_{23}	—	November 9, 2001	Socorro	LINEAR	·	2.3 km	MPC · JPL
148848	2001 VY_{24}	—	November 9, 2001	Socorro	LINEAR	·	3.7 km	MPC · JPL
148849	2001 VF_{25}	—	November 9, 2001	Socorro	LINEAR	WIT	1.7 km	MPC · JPL
148850	2001 VC_{27}	—	November 9, 2001	Socorro	LINEAR	·	3.7 km	MPC · JPL
148851	2001 VR_{29}	—	November 9, 2001	Socorro	LINEAR	NYS	2.3 km	MPC · JPL
148852	2001 VL_{31}	—	November 9, 2001	Socorro	LINEAR	·	2.8 km	MPC · JPL
148853	2001 VJ_{34}	—	November 9, 2001	Socorro	LINEAR	·	3.3 km	MPC · JPL
148854	2001 VP_{36}	—	November 9, 2001	Socorro	LINEAR	·	3.0 km	MPC · JPL
148855	2001 VS_{38}	—	November 9, 2001	Socorro	LINEAR	·	2.4 km	MPC · JPL
148856	2001 VU_{50}	—	November 10, 2001	Socorro	LINEAR	·	3.4 km	MPC · JPL
148857	2001 VU_{52}	—	November 10, 2001	Socorro	LINEAR	·	2.6 km	MPC · JPL
148858	2001 VH_{56}	—	November 10, 2001	Socorro	LINEAR	PAD	4.5 km	MPC · JPL
148859	2001 VC_{57}	—	November 10, 2001	Socorro	LINEAR	·	2.6 km	MPC · JPL
148860	2001 VK_{59}	—	November 10, 2001	Socorro	LINEAR	·	3.7 km	MPC · JPL
148861	2001 VL_{60}	—	November 10, 2001	Socorro	LINEAR	·	2.6 km	MPC · JPL
148862	2001 VD_{66}	—	November 10, 2001	Socorro	LINEAR	slow	3.4 km	MPC · JPL
148863	2001 VV_{66}	—	November 10, 2001	Socorro	LINEAR	·	3.3 km	MPC · JPL
148864	2001 VP_{72}	—	November 12, 2001	Kitt Peak	Spacewatch	·	2.6 km	MPC · JPL
148865	2001 VF_{76}	—	November 15, 2001	Ondřejov	P. Pravec, P. Kušnirák	·	2.3 km	MPC · JPL
148866	2001 VQ_{81}	—	November 15, 2001	Palomar	NEAT	·	4.3 km	MPC · JPL
148867	2001 VR_{88}	—	November 15, 2001	Palomar	NEAT	·	2.8 km	MPC · JPL
148868	2001 VV_{90}	—	November 15, 2001	Socorro	LINEAR	·	5.8 km	MPC · JPL
148869	2001 VL_{99}	—	November 15, 2001	Socorro	LINEAR	·	4.9 km	MPC · JPL
148870	2001 VE_{103}	—	November 12, 2001	Socorro	LINEAR	·	2.6 km	MPC · JPL
148871	2001 VC_{113}	—	November 12, 2001	Socorro	LINEAR	·	3.1 km	MPC · JPL
148872	2001 VM_{114}	—	November 12, 2001	Socorro	LINEAR	(21344)	2.3 km	MPC · JPL
148873	2001 VV_{115}	—	November 12, 2001	Socorro	LINEAR	·	2.9 km	MPC · JPL
148874	2001 VH_{116}	—	November 12, 2001	Socorro	LINEAR	·	2.5 km	MPC · JPL
148875	2001 VZ_{116}	—	November 12, 2001	Socorro	LINEAR	·	2.7 km	MPC · JPL
148876	2001 VS_{119}	—	November 12, 2001	Socorro	LINEAR	WIT	1.8 km	MPC · JPL
148877	2001 VA_{124}	—	November 10, 2001	Palomar	NEAT	·	2.4 km	MPC · JPL
148878	2001 VC_{124}	—	November 11, 2001	Palomar	NEAT	·	2.8 km	MPC · JPL
148879	2001 VU_{125}	—	November 12, 2001	Socorro	LINEAR	·	2.7 km	MPC · JPL
148880	2001 WL_{5}	—	November 17, 2001	Haleakala	NEAT	EUN	2.4 km	MPC · JPL
148881	2001 WM_{7}	—	November 17, 2001	Socorro	LINEAR	AGN	1.7 km	MPC · JPL
148882	2001 WQ_{9}	—	November 17, 2001	Socorro	LINEAR	·	3.9 km	MPC · JPL
148883	2001 WP_{11}	—	November 17, 2001	Socorro	LINEAR	·	3.9 km	MPC · JPL
148884	2001 WO_{14}	—	November 20, 2001	Ondřejov	P. Pravec, P. Kušnirák	·	2.1 km	MPC · JPL
148885	2001 WV_{15}	—	November 24, 2001	Socorro	LINEAR	H	870 m	MPC · JPL
148886	2001 WC_{19}	—	November 17, 2001	Socorro	LINEAR	MAR	1.9 km	MPC · JPL
148887	2001 WQ_{19}	—	November 17, 2001	Socorro	LINEAR	AST	3.9 km	MPC · JPL
148888	2001 WJ_{20}	—	November 17, 2001	Socorro	LINEAR	(21344)	3.1 km	MPC · JPL
148889	2001 WL_{29}	—	November 17, 2001	Socorro	LINEAR	·	3.6 km	MPC · JPL
148890	2001 WO_{30}	—	November 17, 2001	Socorro	LINEAR	·	2.3 km	MPC · JPL
148891	2001 WZ_{30}	—	November 17, 2001	Socorro	LINEAR	·	2.5 km	MPC · JPL
148892	2001 WY_{32}	—	November 17, 2001	Socorro	LINEAR	MRX	2.3 km	MPC · JPL
148893	2001 WP_{34}	—	November 17, 2001	Socorro	LINEAR	AEO	1.7 km	MPC · JPL
148894	2001 WX_{34}	—	November 17, 2001	Socorro	LINEAR	·	2.5 km	MPC · JPL
148895	2001 WE_{38}	—	November 17, 2001	Socorro	LINEAR	·	3.2 km	MPC · JPL
148896	2001 WQ_{42}	—	November 18, 2001	Socorro	LINEAR	·	2.2 km	MPC · JPL
148897	2001 WN_{56}	—	November 19, 2001	Socorro	LINEAR	·	2.1 km	MPC · JPL
148898	2001 WT_{57}	—	November 19, 2001	Socorro	LINEAR	·	2.4 km	MPC · JPL
148899	2001 WD_{60}	—	November 19, 2001	Socorro	LINEAR	·	2.2 km	MPC · JPL
148900	2001 WO_{61}	—	November 19, 2001	Socorro	LINEAR	·	2.4 km	MPC · JPL

== 148901–149000 ==
back to top

Designation			Discovery			Properties		Ref
Permanent	Provisional	Named after	Date	Site	Discoverer(s)	Category	Diam.	Ref
148901	2001 WR_{67}	—	November 20, 2001	Socorro	LINEAR	·	2.1 km	MPC · JPL
148902	2001 WA_{68}	—	November 20, 2001	Socorro	LINEAR	·	2.8 km	MPC · JPL
148903	2001 WX_{70}	—	November 20, 2001	Socorro	LINEAR	MIS	3.2 km	MPC · JPL
148904	2001 WD_{89}	—	November 20, 2001	Socorro	LINEAR	(17392)	2.4 km	MPC · JPL
148905	2001 WA_{90}	—	November 21, 2001	Socorro	LINEAR	DOR	4.2 km	MPC · JPL
148906	2001 WC_{91}	—	November 21, 2001	Socorro	LINEAR	·	3.3 km	MPC · JPL
148907	2001 WA_{93}	—	November 21, 2001	Socorro	LINEAR	·	3.6 km	MPC · JPL
148908	2001 XL_{1}	—	December 9, 2001	Palomar	NEAT	·	3.4 km	MPC · JPL
148909	2001 XA_{2}	—	December 8, 2001	Socorro	LINEAR	·	4.5 km	MPC · JPL
148910	2001 XY_{9}	—	December 9, 2001	Socorro	LINEAR	·	5.6 km	MPC · JPL
148911	2001 XX_{13}	—	December 9, 2001	Socorro	LINEAR	·	3.4 km	MPC · JPL
148912	2001 XK_{18}	—	December 9, 2001	Socorro	LINEAR	GEF	2.3 km	MPC · JPL
148913	2001 XE_{34}	—	December 9, 2001	Socorro	LINEAR	·	3.3 km	MPC · JPL
148914	2001 XX_{35}	—	December 9, 2001	Socorro	LINEAR	·	3.6 km	MPC · JPL
148915	2001 XR_{36}	—	December 9, 2001	Socorro	LINEAR	·	3.4 km	MPC · JPL
148916	2001 XF_{41}	—	December 9, 2001	Socorro	LINEAR	·	4.4 km	MPC · JPL
148917	2001 XL_{48}	—	December 10, 2001	Socorro	LINEAR	·	4.6 km	MPC · JPL
148918	2001 XJ_{50}	—	December 10, 2001	Socorro	LINEAR	·	2.9 km	MPC · JPL
148919	2001 XG_{51}	—	December 10, 2001	Socorro	LINEAR	·	2.6 km	MPC · JPL
148920	2001 XB_{54}	—	December 10, 2001	Socorro	LINEAR	·	3.1 km	MPC · JPL
148921	2001 XO_{69}	—	December 11, 2001	Socorro	LINEAR	GEF	2.4 km	MPC · JPL
148922	2001 XW_{72}	—	December 11, 2001	Socorro	LINEAR	·	2.7 km	MPC · JPL
148923	2001 XH_{73}	—	December 11, 2001	Socorro	LINEAR	·	2.8 km	MPC · JPL
148924	2001 XL_{73}	—	December 11, 2001	Socorro	LINEAR	(17392)	2.9 km	MPC · JPL
148925	2001 XD_{75}	—	December 11, 2001	Socorro	LINEAR	·	2.5 km	MPC · JPL
148926	2001 XR_{75}	—	December 11, 2001	Socorro	LINEAR	·	2.7 km	MPC · JPL
148927	2001 XM_{77}	—	December 11, 2001	Socorro	LINEAR	·	3.2 km	MPC · JPL
148928	2001 XW_{79}	—	December 11, 2001	Socorro	LINEAR	·	3.3 km	MPC · JPL
148929	2001 XN_{89}	—	December 10, 2001	Socorro	LINEAR	·	2.9 km	MPC · JPL
148930	2001 XN_{90}	—	December 10, 2001	Socorro	LINEAR	·	1.9 km	MPC · JPL
148931	2001 XA_{92}	—	December 10, 2001	Socorro	LINEAR	(12739)	2.6 km	MPC · JPL
148932	2001 XR_{92}	—	December 10, 2001	Socorro	LINEAR	(5)	2.3 km	MPC · JPL
148933	2001 XZ_{99}	—	December 10, 2001	Socorro	LINEAR	EUN	3.3 km	MPC · JPL
148934	2001 XO_{101}	—	December 10, 2001	Socorro	LINEAR	·	3.5 km	MPC · JPL
148935	2001 XU_{106}	—	December 10, 2001	Socorro	LINEAR	·	2.3 km	MPC · JPL
148936	2001 XL_{113}	—	December 11, 2001	Socorro	LINEAR	(5)	2.8 km	MPC · JPL
148937	2001 XK_{114}	—	December 13, 2001	Socorro	LINEAR	·	3.3 km	MPC · JPL
148938	2001 XB_{117}	—	December 13, 2001	Socorro	LINEAR	·	5.5 km	MPC · JPL
148939	2001 XT_{123}	—	December 14, 2001	Socorro	LINEAR	·	2.6 km	MPC · JPL
148940	2001 XF_{126}	—	December 14, 2001	Socorro	LINEAR	·	2.6 km	MPC · JPL
148941	2001 XC_{131}	—	December 14, 2001	Socorro	LINEAR	·	2.4 km	MPC · JPL
148942	2001 XC_{138}	—	December 14, 2001	Socorro	LINEAR	AGN	2.0 km	MPC · JPL
148943	2001 XA_{139}	—	December 14, 2001	Socorro	LINEAR	·	4.4 km	MPC · JPL
148944	2001 XW_{141}	—	December 14, 2001	Socorro	LINEAR	KOR	2.2 km	MPC · JPL
148945	2001 XS_{144}	—	December 14, 2001	Socorro	LINEAR	HOF	4.3 km	MPC · JPL
148946	2001 XE_{148}	—	December 14, 2001	Socorro	LINEAR	AGN	1.9 km	MPC · JPL
148947	2001 XA_{151}	—	December 14, 2001	Socorro	LINEAR	DOR	3.7 km	MPC · JPL
148948	2001 XQ_{154}	—	December 14, 2001	Socorro	LINEAR	(5)	2.9 km	MPC · JPL
148949	2001 XM_{159}	—	December 14, 2001	Socorro	LINEAR	·	3.0 km	MPC · JPL
148950	2001 XX_{163}	—	December 14, 2001	Socorro	LINEAR	AGN	1.7 km	MPC · JPL
148951	2001 XB_{167}	—	December 14, 2001	Socorro	LINEAR	·	3.7 km	MPC · JPL
148952	2001 XD_{179}	—	December 14, 2001	Socorro	LINEAR	·	5.3 km	MPC · JPL
148953	2001 XE_{188}	—	December 14, 2001	Socorro	LINEAR	GEF	1.8 km	MPC · JPL
148954	2001 XX_{203}	—	December 11, 2001	Socorro	LINEAR	·	3.3 km	MPC · JPL
148955	2001 XQ_{204}	—	December 11, 2001	Socorro	LINEAR	·	2.8 km	MPC · JPL
148956	2001 XC_{205}	—	December 11, 2001	Socorro	LINEAR	·	3.4 km	MPC · JPL
148957	2001 XD_{205}	—	December 11, 2001	Socorro	LINEAR	·	2.6 km	MPC · JPL
148958	2001 XM_{216}	—	December 14, 2001	Socorro	LINEAR	AEO	1.7 km	MPC · JPL
148959	2001 XU_{222}	—	December 15, 2001	Socorro	LINEAR	·	1.9 km	MPC · JPL
148960	2001 XY_{222}	—	December 15, 2001	Socorro	LINEAR	·	2.7 km	MPC · JPL
148961	2001 XM_{224}	—	December 15, 2001	Socorro	LINEAR	·	3.1 km	MPC · JPL
148962	2001 XU_{224}	—	December 15, 2001	Socorro	LINEAR	·	3.6 km	MPC · JPL
148963	2001 XW_{225}	—	December 15, 2001	Socorro	LINEAR	·	4.1 km	MPC · JPL
148964	2001 XF_{226}	—	December 15, 2001	Socorro	LINEAR	·	3.0 km	MPC · JPL
148965	2001 XK_{227}	—	December 15, 2001	Socorro	LINEAR	·	2.5 km	MPC · JPL
148966	2001 XT_{228}	—	December 15, 2001	Socorro	LINEAR	·	2.6 km	MPC · JPL
148967	2001 XV_{231}	—	December 15, 2001	Socorro	LINEAR	KOR	2.0 km	MPC · JPL
148968	2001 XN_{233}	—	December 15, 2001	Socorro	LINEAR	·	2.5 km	MPC · JPL
148969	2001 XY_{233}	—	December 15, 2001	Socorro	LINEAR	KOR	2.3 km	MPC · JPL
148970	2001 XG_{235}	—	December 15, 2001	Socorro	LINEAR	AGN	1.8 km	MPC · JPL
148971	2001 XZ_{236}	—	December 15, 2001	Socorro	LINEAR	·	3.2 km	MPC · JPL
148972	2001 XN_{237}	—	December 15, 2001	Socorro	LINEAR	·	3.0 km	MPC · JPL
148973	2001 XP_{249}	—	December 14, 2001	Socorro	LINEAR	·	2.8 km	MPC · JPL
148974	2001 XD_{250}	—	December 14, 2001	Socorro	LINEAR	AGN	1.7 km	MPC · JPL
148975	2001 XA_{255}	—	December 9, 2001	Mauna Kea	D. C. Jewitt, S. S. Sheppard, Kleyna, J.	centaur	38 km	MPC · JPL
148976	2001 XN_{264}	—	December 14, 2001	Kitt Peak	Spacewatch	·	2.5 km	MPC · JPL
148977	2001 YX_{21}	—	December 18, 2001	Socorro	LINEAR	·	3.4 km	MPC · JPL
148978	2001 YO_{24}	—	December 18, 2001	Socorro	LINEAR	·	2.0 km	MPC · JPL
148979	2001 YH_{27}	—	December 18, 2001	Socorro	LINEAR	·	4.1 km	MPC · JPL
148980	2001 YA_{33}	—	December 18, 2001	Socorro	LINEAR	AGN	1.8 km	MPC · JPL
148981	2001 YU_{34}	—	December 18, 2001	Socorro	LINEAR	·	2.5 km	MPC · JPL
148982	2001 YS_{38}	—	December 18, 2001	Socorro	LINEAR	·	2.5 km	MPC · JPL
148983	2001 YT_{39}	—	December 18, 2001	Socorro	LINEAR	·	2.8 km	MPC · JPL
148984	2001 YA_{41}	—	December 18, 2001	Socorro	LINEAR	·	2.6 km	MPC · JPL
148985	2001 YF_{43}	—	December 18, 2001	Socorro	LINEAR	·	3.0 km	MPC · JPL
148986	2001 YO_{47}	—	December 18, 2001	Socorro	LINEAR	HOF	3.9 km	MPC · JPL
148987	2001 YC_{48}	—	December 18, 2001	Socorro	LINEAR	·	3.4 km	MPC · JPL
148988	2001 YR_{67}	—	December 18, 2001	Socorro	LINEAR	·	3.1 km	MPC · JPL
148989	2001 YM_{73}	—	December 18, 2001	Socorro	LINEAR	·	3.4 km	MPC · JPL
148990	2001 YX_{92}	—	December 17, 2001	Kitt Peak	Deep Lens Survey	·	2.1 km	MPC · JPL
148991	2001 YH_{98}	—	December 17, 2001	Socorro	LINEAR	(12739)	3.0 km	MPC · JPL
148992	2001 YS_{100}	—	December 17, 2001	Socorro	LINEAR	AGN	2.0 km	MPC · JPL
148993	2001 YA_{101}	—	December 17, 2001	Socorro	LINEAR	WIT	2.0 km	MPC · JPL
148994	2001 YT_{121}	—	December 17, 2001	Socorro	LINEAR	·	3.8 km	MPC · JPL
148995	2001 YL_{122}	—	December 17, 2001	Socorro	LINEAR	·	3.7 km	MPC · JPL
148996	2001 YA_{123}	—	December 17, 2001	Socorro	LINEAR	NEM	4.3 km	MPC · JPL
148997	2001 YU_{126}	—	December 17, 2001	Socorro	LINEAR	GEF	2.2 km	MPC · JPL
148998	2001 YF_{127}	—	December 17, 2001	Socorro	LINEAR	HOF	4.9 km	MPC · JPL
148999	2001 YF_{128}	—	December 17, 2001	Socorro	LINEAR	·	3.1 km	MPC · JPL
149000	2001 YM_{130}	—	December 17, 2001	Socorro	LINEAR	·	3.5 km	MPC · JPL

back to top

== See also ==
- Meanings of minor-planet names: 148001–149000
